= Sykes Churches Trail =

Trail in the East Riding of Yorkshire, England

The Sykes Churches Trail is a tour of East Yorkshire churches which were built, rebuilt or restored by the Sykes family of Sledmere House in the East Riding of Yorkshire, England. The tour was devised by the East Yorkshire Historic Churches Group and is divided into a southern circuit and a planned northern circuit.

Work on the churches was financed by Sir Tatton Sykes, 4th Baronet (1772–1863) and his son Sir Tatton Sykes, 5th Baronet (1826–1913). The 4th Baronet engaged John Loughborough Pearson to work on churches at Garton on the Wolds, Kirkburn, Bishop Wilton and Hilston in Holderness. The 5th Baronet worked with the architects C. Hodgson Fowler, G.E.Street and Temple Moore. His achievements were far greater than his father's, and unparalleled elsewhere in Britain. He financed work on 17 rural churches between 1866 and 1913.

== Churches of the southern circuit ==
Southern circuit
Key
BW = Bishop Wilton

C = Cowlam

F = Fridaythorpe

Fi = Fimber

GW = Garton on the Wolds

K = Kirkburn

NF = North Frodingham

S = Sledmere

T = Thixendale

W = Wansford

We = Wetwang

These include:

Dedication	Location	Notes	OS Grid square	Image
St Elgin	North Frodingham	Restored in stages between 1877 and 1891 by the 5th Baronet. The top part of the Perpendicular tower was designed by Temple Moore.	TA101531	
St Mary	Sledmere	Built in 1893–8, to a design by Temple Moore, at a cost of £60,000. Stained glass by H.V. Milner and Burlison and Grylls.	SE930645	
St Mary	Cowlam	A small medieval church restored in 1852 to a design by Mary E Sykes, daughter of the 4th Baronet.	SE966655	
St Michael	Garton on the Wolds	Dates from around 1120 and was restored in 1856–7 with stained glass by Clayton and Bell to a design of J.L.Pearson.	SE982593	
St Mary	Kirkburn	A Norman church that was restored in 1856–7 when it had a porch added.	SE979550	
St Nicholas	Wetwang	Another church of Norman origin which was restored by both Baronets between 1845 and 1902.	SE930591	
St Mary	Fridaythorpe	Restored in 1902–3 with the addition of a new north aisle designed by C. Hodgson Fowler and stained glass by Burlison and Grylls	SE875591	
St Mary	Thixendale	One of a group of village buildings constructed to designs by G.E.Street in 1868–70.	SE841611	
St Mary	Fimber	Built in 1869–71 in a thirteenth-century style to replace a chapel of ease.	SE895605	
St Edith	Bishop Wilton	Faithfully restored in 1858–9 with lavish internal embellishment to designs of J.L.Pearson.	SE797552	
St Mary	Wansford	Newly built in 1866–8 to designs by G.E.Street.	TA061566	

== Other Sykes churches ==
These include several churches previously in the East Riding which, after boundary changes, are now in North Yorkshire.

Other Sykes churches
Key

EH = East Heslerton

H = Helperthorpe

Hi = Hilston

K = Kirby Grindalythe

L = Langtoft

S = Sherburn

W = West Lutton

WE = Weaverthorpe

Dedication	Location	Notes	OS Grid square	Image
St Andrew	East Heslerton	Newly built in 1877 to a design by G.E.Street and is now a Grade I listed building.	SE927767	
St Hilda	Sherburn, North Yorkshire	A Grade I listed building restored by the architect C. Hodgson Fowler between 1909 and 1913.	SE959774	
St Andrew	Kirby Grindalythe	Restored in 1872–5 to a design by G.E.Street and after a recent grant of about £175,000 from English Heritage the church is now a Grade II* listed building.	SE903675	
St Mary	West Lutton	Set in the Great Wold Valley and has an atmosphere of peace and wide open spaces. The architect was G. E. Street and the stained glass is by Burlinson and Grylls.	SE930692	
St Peter	Helperthorpe	Stands above the village. The original wooden church was pulled down in 1872 and replaced in 1875. The church and vicarage were designed by architect G.E.Street.	SE952704	
St Andrew	Weaverthorpe	A stone built church with a Norman tower and unusual round staircase which protrudes on the exterior of the tower. It was restored by G.E.Street in 1870–72 and is Grade I listed.	SE966711	
St Peter	Langtoft, East Riding of Yorkshire	This was a restoration, by C. Hodgson Fowler, in 1900–03 when the north aisle was added.	TA007670	
St Margaret	Hilston	Probably of 12th-century origin, it was demolished and rebuilt to designs by J. L. Pearson in 1861–2. This new church suffered extensive bomb damage in 1941 and was rebuilt in 1956–7 to designs by Mr. Francis Johnson of Bridlington, reusing a Norman doorway from the original church and some 19th-century stained glass windows.	TA289335	
