= Lutton =

Lutton may refer to the following places in England:

- Lutton, Cornwood, village in Cornwood parish, Devon
- Lutton, South Brent, hamlet in South Brent parish, Devon
- Lutton, Lincolnshire, village and civil parish
- Lutton, Northamptonshire, village and civil parish
- East Lutton and West Lutton in North Yorkshire, collectively known as 'Luttons Ambo' (not to be confused with the nearby Huttons Ambo)

== See also ==
- Luton (disambiguation)
