= Duggleby =

Hamlet in North Yorkshire, England

Coordinates: 54.092280°N 0.659020°W

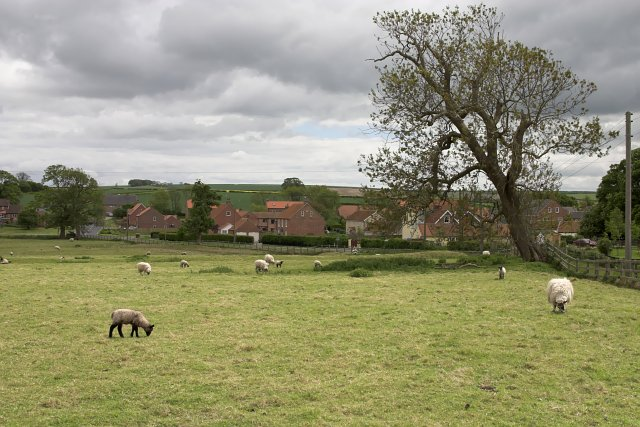
- Duggleby hamlet

- Location within North Yorkshire
- OS grid reference: SE878670
  - London: 232 miles
- Civil parish: Duggleby
- Unitary authority: North Yorkshire
- Ceremonial county: North Yorkshire
- Region: Yorkshire and the Humber
- Country: England
- Sovereign state: United Kingdom
- Post town: MALTON
- Postcode district: YO17
- Police: North Yorkshire
- Fire: North Yorkshire
- Ambulance: Yorkshire
- UK Parliament: Thirsk and Malton

Duggleby is a settlement and civil parish in North Yorkshire, England. It was historically part of the East Riding of Yorkshire until 1974. It was part of the Ryedale district from 1974 to 2023.

It is 20 miles (32.2 km) north-east of York and 16 miles (25.7 km) south-west of Scarborough. The village lies in the Great Wold Valley and the course of the winterbourne stream the Gypsey Race passes through it.

To the south-east of the hamlet is Duggleby Howe, one of the largest round barrows in Britain.

Duggleby was formerly a township in the parish of Kirby-Grindalyth, in 1866 Duggleby became a separate civil parish, on 1 April 1935 the parish was abolished and merged with Kirby Grindalythe. In 1931 the parish had a population of 155. On 1 April 2026 Duggleby became a parish again.

The name Duggleby derives from the Old Norse Dubgallbȳ meaning 'Dubgall's village'.
