= East Lutton =

Hamlet in North Yorkshire, England

Coordinates: 54.1145°N 0.56057°W

- Location within North Yorkshire
- OS grid reference: SE941696
  - London: 180 mi (290 km) S
- Civil parish: Luttons
- Unitary authority: North Yorkshire
- Ceremonial county: North Yorkshire
- Region: Yorkshire and the Humber
- Country: England
- Sovereign state: United Kingdom
- Post town: MALTON
- Postcode district: YO17
- Police: North Yorkshire
- Fire: North Yorkshire
- Ambulance: Yorkshire
- UK Parliament: Thirsk and Malton

East Lutton is a hamlet in North Yorkshire, England. It is situated approximately 9 miles (14 km) east from Malton, and within the Yorkshire Wolds.

The village of West Lutton is 0.5 miles (0.8 km) to the west. The village lies in the Great Wold Valley and the course of the winterbourne stream the Gypsey Race passes through it.

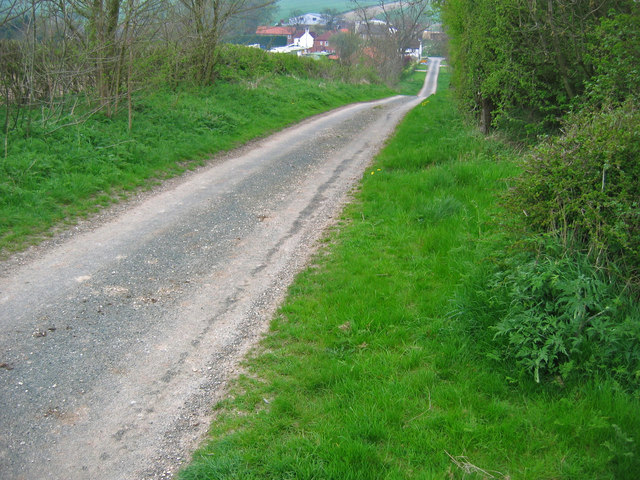
East Lutton

East Lutton forms part of the civil parish of Luttons.

In 1823 East Lutton was in the parish of Weaverthorpe, the Wapentake of Buckrose, and the Liberty of St Peter's in the East Riding of Yorkshire. Population, including West Lutton was 311. East Lutton occupations included four farmers, a grocer & draper, a tailor, a shoemaker, and a corn miller.

It was part of the East Riding of Yorkshire until 1974. From 1974 to 2023 it was part of the district of Ryedale, it is now administered by the unitary North Yorkshire Council.

The name Lutton derives from the Old English Ludatūn meaning 'Luda's settlement'.

== See also ==
- Listed buildings in Luttons
