= Luton (disambiguation) =

Luton is a town and the largest settlement in Bedfordshire, England.

Luton may also refer to:

== Places ==
- Luton, East Devon, a hamlet in the parish of Broadhembury in Devon, England
- Luton, Teignbridge, a village near Newton Abbot in Devon, England
- Luton, Kent, an area of the town of Chatham, Kent, England
- Luton, Iowa, United States, a town near Sioux City
- Luton, Ontario, Canada, a town
- Luton, Philippines, a town in Province of Cebu, Central Visayas, Philippines
- London Luton Airport, in Bedfordshire, England
- Borough of Luton, a district of Bedfordshire, England
- Luton (UK Parliament constituency), Bedfordshire, England

== People ==
- Daniel Luton (1821–1901), Canadian farmer and politician
- Jake Luton (born 1996), American football player
- Luton Shelton (1985–2021), Jamaican footballer

== Other uses ==
- GMM Luton Vehicles, former name of manufacturing plant in England
- University of Luton, merged to form the University of Bedfordshire
- Luton Aircraft Limited, a 1930s British aircraft manufacturer
- Luton body, a style of commercial vehicle body
- Luton v Lessels, a 2002 High Court of Australia case
- Luton Town F.C., a football club based in Luton, Bedfordshire
- Luton Town L.F.C., a women's football club
- Luton system, a pairing system used in tournaments for games, especially chess

== See also ==
- Lutton (disambiguation)
