= St Martin's Church, Wharram Percy =

Church in North Yorkshire, England

Coordinates: 54.0667°N 0.6901°W

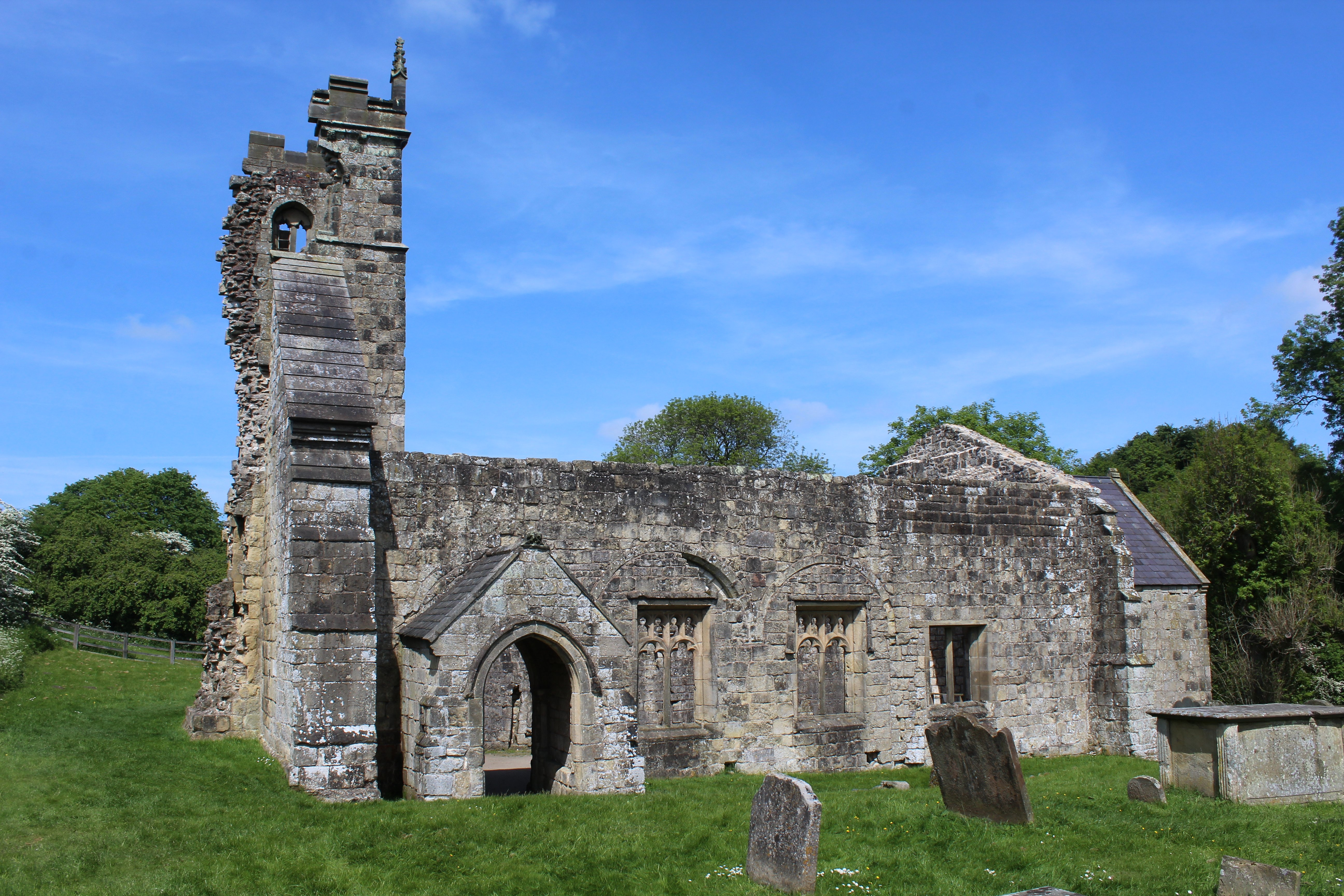
The church, in 2023

St Martin's Church is a ruined church in Wharram Percy, a deserted village in North Yorkshire, in England.

A timber church was built in Wharram Percy in the mid or late 10th century, and in the mid 11th century, it was rebuilt in stone. The oldest parts of the current church date from the 12th century. The tower was also built in the 12th century, but an initial attempt to construct it at the west end failed, and it was instead built to straddle the west wall of the nave. The church was altered in the 13th and 14th centuries, then the east wall was rebuilt in the 15th century. The village was deserted in the early 16th century, and the church was reduced in size later that century and again in the 17th century, but remained in use for worshippers from Thixendale. In 1870, St Mary's Church, Thixendale was constructed and St Martin's fell into disrepair. The furnishings were removed in 1954, and the tower collapsed in 1959. Despite this, the building was grade II* listed in 1966. The church was made redundant in 1971. It was partly reroofed in the 1980s, and is now owned by English Heritage.

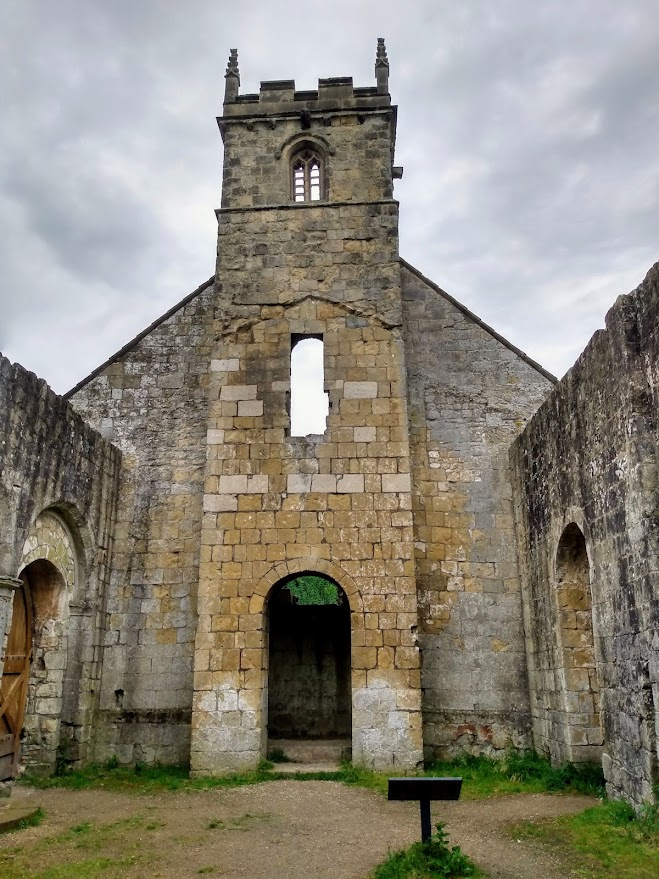
Interior view of the church

The church is built of limestone, and is roofless apart from the chancel, which has a Westmorland slate roof. The church consists of a nave with a south porch, a chancel, and a west tower. The tower, which has partly collapsed, has two-light bell openings, part of an embattled parapet and a crocketed pinnacle. The south porch has a 13th-century doorway with a pointed moulded arch on responds with stiff-leaf capitals.

== See also ==
- Grade II* listed churches in North Yorkshire (district)
- Listed buildings in Wharram
