= Listed buildings in Luttons =

Luttons is a civil parish in the county of North Yorkshire, England. It contains eleven listed buildings that are recorded in the National Heritage List for England. Of these, one is listed at Grade II*, the middle of the three grades, and the others are at Grade II, the lowest grade. The parish contains the villages of West Lutton and Helperthorpe, the hamlet of East Lutton, and the surrounding countryside. The listed buildings include two churches and associated structures, and a vicarage and outbuildings, all designed by G. E. Street, and the others include a house, a cottage, farmhouses and farm buildings.

== Key ==
Grade	Criteria
II*	Particularly important buildings of more than special interest
II	Buildings of national importance and special interest

== Buildings ==
Name and location	Photograph	Date	Notes	Grade
Manor Farmhouse; 54.11474°N 0.55970°W	—	Late 18th century	The farmhouse is in pink mottled brick, with a dentilled eaves band, and a pantile roof with coped gables and shaped kneelers. There are two storeys, a double depth plan, three bays, and a rear extension. The central doorway has pilasters, a divided fanlight, and a cornice hood on consoles. The windows are sashes with painted stone sills and painted cambered arches.	II
West Farmhouse, cottage and outbuildings 54.11855°N 0.54802°W	—	Late 18th century	The farmhouse is in whitewashed brick, with a stepped eaves course, and a hipped pantile roof. There are two storeys and an L-shaped plan, with a front range of four bays. The doorway has a divided fanlight, the windows are sashes, and all the openings have cambered brick arches. In the left return is a two-storey two-bay cottage, and beyond that is a range of farm buildings with one storey.	II
Clara's Cottage; 54.10981°N 0.57943°W	—	c. 1801	The cottage is in whitewashed chalk, with brick dressings and a pantile roof. There is one storey and an attic, and two bays. On the front is a doorway, and the windows are horizontally-sliding sashes.	II
Church Farmhouse; 54.10988°N 0.57774°W	—	Early 19th century	The farmhouse is in pink mottled brick, with a cogged eaves course and a hipped slate roof. There are two storeys, three bays, and a rear wing. On the front is a Tuscan porch and a doorway with a fluted surround, a divided fanlight, and a pediment. The windows are sashes with painted stone sills and painted wedge lintels.	II
Holly House; 54.10970°N 0.57899°W	—	Early to mid 19th century	The house is in pink mottled brick with a pantile roof. There are two storeys and three bays, and a rear wing. The central doorway has pilasters, a bordered fanlight, and a cornice hood on consoles. The widows are sashes with painted segmental arches.	II
St Peter's Church; 54.12075°N 0.54375°W		1871–73	The church, designed by G. E. Street, is in sandstone on a chamfered plinth, with a tile roof. The north aisle and vestry were added in 1893 by Temple Moore. The church consists of a nave, a north aisle, a south porch, a chancel and a vestry, and a west steeple. The steeple has a tower with three stages on a moulded plinth, with a three-light west window, a string course, pointed bell openings with hood moulds, and a broach spire with bands, gablets and a weathercock. To the southeast of the tower is a half-hexagonal stair turret containing a statue in a niche under a gabled canopy.	II
Churchyard wall and gates, St Peter's Church; 54.12058°N 0.54384°W	—	1873	The wall and gates were designed by G. E. Street. The wall encloses the south and northeast sides of the churchyard, and is in rock-faced sandstone with sloping coping. The south gateway is gabled, and has a pointed arch with a chamfered and moulded surround, dwarf buttresses, and a cross finial. The northeastern gateway has square piers with projecting flat caps, and the gates are in wrought iron.	II
Vicarage and wall 54.12101°N 0.54310°W	—	1873	The vicarage, designed by G. E. Street. is in red brick, with sandstone dressings, a moulded floor band, and a tile roof with tumbled brick and coped gables. There is one storey and attics, and three bays, the right two bays gabled, and the right bay projecting. In the middle bay is a pointed doorway with a hood mould, and the right bay has a square bay window on a chamfered plinth with a moulded cornice and a parapet with chamfered coping. All the windows are mullioned, and all the openings have quoined and chamfered surrounds. The kitchen garden walls are about 1.75 metres (5 ft 9 in) high, they are stepped over the gateways, and have sloped coping.	II
Coach house and stables northwest of the Vicarage; 54.12121°N 0.54331°W	—	1873	The coach house and stables, later used for other purposes, were designed by G. E. Street. They are in red brick, partly tile-hung, with a tile roof. They form an L-shaped plan, the coach house with one storey and an attic, and the stable a single-storey cross-wing. The coach house contains a garage door, a board door and a window under a continuous lintel, and a half-hipped dormer. The stable contains doorways and windows.	II
St Mary's Church; 54.11054°N 0.57798°W		1872–73	The church, designed by G. E. Street, is in sandstone on a chamfered plinth, with a tile roof. It consists of a nave, north and south aisles, a south porch, and a chancel and vestry. On the west gable is a tile-hung belfry with timber balustraded bell openings, and a broach spire with a weathercock. The porch is gabled and has a pointed arch with three orders. Above it is a bracketed niche containing a statue, and a crocketed canopy.	II*
Footbridge, Lychgate and wall, St Mary's Church; 54.11044°N 0.57753°W		1875	The footbridge, lychgate and churchyard wall were designed by G. E. Street and are in sandstone. The footbridge crossing a small stream at the entrance to the churchyard consists of a single chamfered segmental arch, with a plain parapet, sloped coping and a moulded ridge. The lychgate has a moulded arch with a hood mould, and a gable with moulded coping, and a crocketed wheel cross. The gates are in wrought iron. Enclosing the churchyard is a low wall with sloped buttresses and moulded coping.	II
