= St Mary's Church, Thixendale =

Church in Thixendale, North Yorkshire, England

Coordinates: 54°02′20″N 0°42′55″W

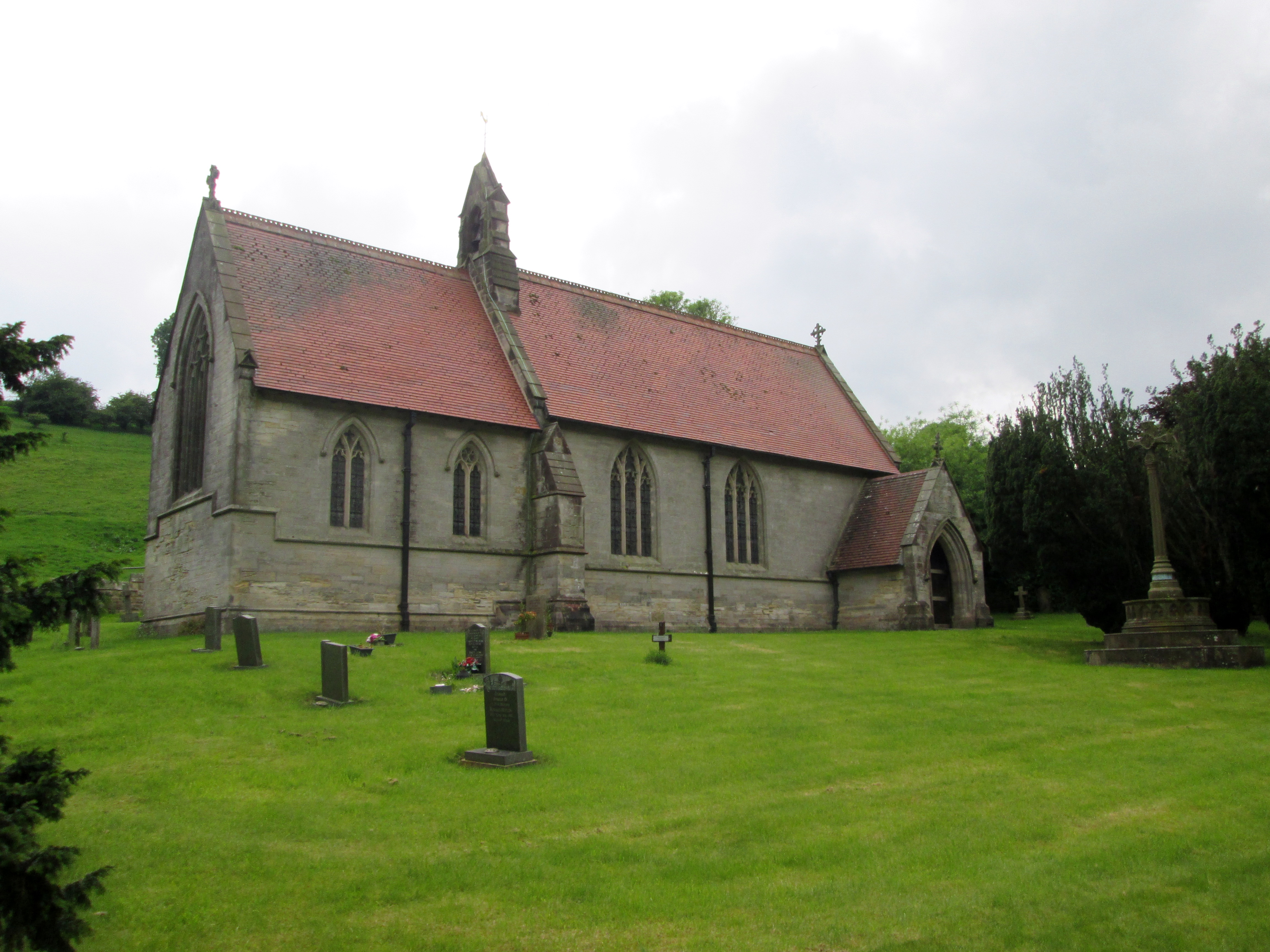
The church, in 2016

St Mary's Church is the parish church of Thixendale, a village in North Yorkshire, in England.

Thixendale long lay in the parish of St Martin's Church, Wharram Percy. A chapel of ease was built in the village, but it was closed in 1541. Although Wharram Percy became a deserted medieval village, the church survived and the villagers of Thixendale had to cross the Yorkshire Wolds to attend services. In 1854, the schoolroom in Thixendale was licensed for Anglican services. Between 1868 and 1870, a new church was built atop a Bronze age tumulus in the village. It was funded by Tatton Sykes. It is in the neo-Gothic style and was designed by G. E. Street, who also designed the vicarage and the village school. A vestry was added in 1875. The building was grade II* listed in 1966.

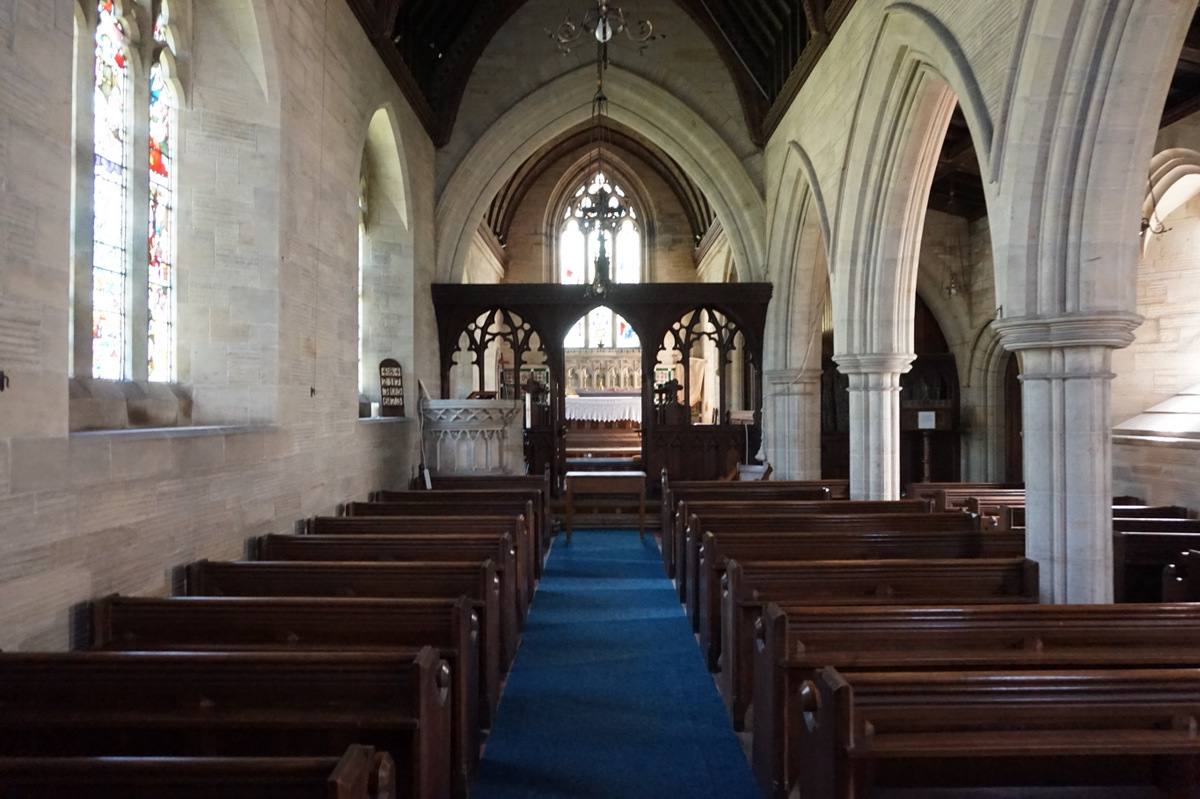
View from the nave into the chancel

The church is built of stone with a tile roof, and consists of a three-bay nave, a south aisle, a north porch, a two-bay chancel and a north vestry. At the west end is an apsidal baptistry above which is a rose window. On the east end of the nave is a bellcote. Inside is a carved wooden screen, installed in 1873 and a stone reredos inlaid with green marble. The east window has stained glass by Burlison and Grylls, while most other windows have glass by Clayton and Bell.

== See also ==
- Grade II* listed churches in North Yorkshire (district)
- Listed buildings in Thixendale
