= West Lutton =

Village in North Yorkshire, England

Coordinates: 54°06′38″N 0°34′38″W

- Location within North Yorkshire
- Population: 411 (2011 census)
- OS grid reference: SE931694
  - London: 180 mi (290 km) S
- Civil parish: Luttons
- Unitary authority: North Yorkshire
- Ceremonial county: North Yorkshire
- Region: Yorkshire and the Humber
- Country: England
- Sovereign state: United Kingdom
- Post town: MALTON
- Postcode district: YO17
- Police: North Yorkshire
- Fire: North Yorkshire
- Ambulance: Yorkshire
- UK Parliament: Thirsk and Malton

West Lutton is a village in North Yorkshire, England. It is situated approximately 9 miles (14 km) east from Malton, and within the Yorkshire Wolds. The hamlet of East Lutton is 0.5 miles (0.8 km) to the east. The village lies in the Great Wold Valley and the course of the winterbourne stream the Gypsey Race passes through it.

The name Lutton derives from the Old English Ludatūn meaning 'Luda's settlement'. They are recorded in the Domesday Book in 1086 as one location, and were home to at least five families. In common with other villages at the time, the Luttons suffered during William the Conqueror's Harrying of the North, during which many farms and homesteads were laid waste, evidenced by the dramatic drop in their annual contribution to the local landowner: from £14 in 1066 to less than £1 in 1086.

West Lutton forms part of the civil parish of Luttons. It was historically part of the East Riding of Yorkshire until 1974. From 1974 to 2023 it was part of the district of Ryedale, it is now administered by the unitary North Yorkshire Council.

St Mary's Church, West Lutton, is designated a Grade II* listed building. The church contains a sculpture by the Derbyshire sculptor James Redfern.

In 1823 West Lutton was in the parish of Weaverthorpe, the Wapentake of Buckrose, and the Liberty of St Peter's in the East Riding of Yorkshire. Population, including East Lutton was 311. West Lutton occupations included six farmers, one of whom was also a grocer and another a wheelwright, two further wheelwrights, a blacksmith, two shoemakers, two tailors, and the landlord of The Board public house.

== See also ==
- Listed buildings in Luttons

== Gallery ==
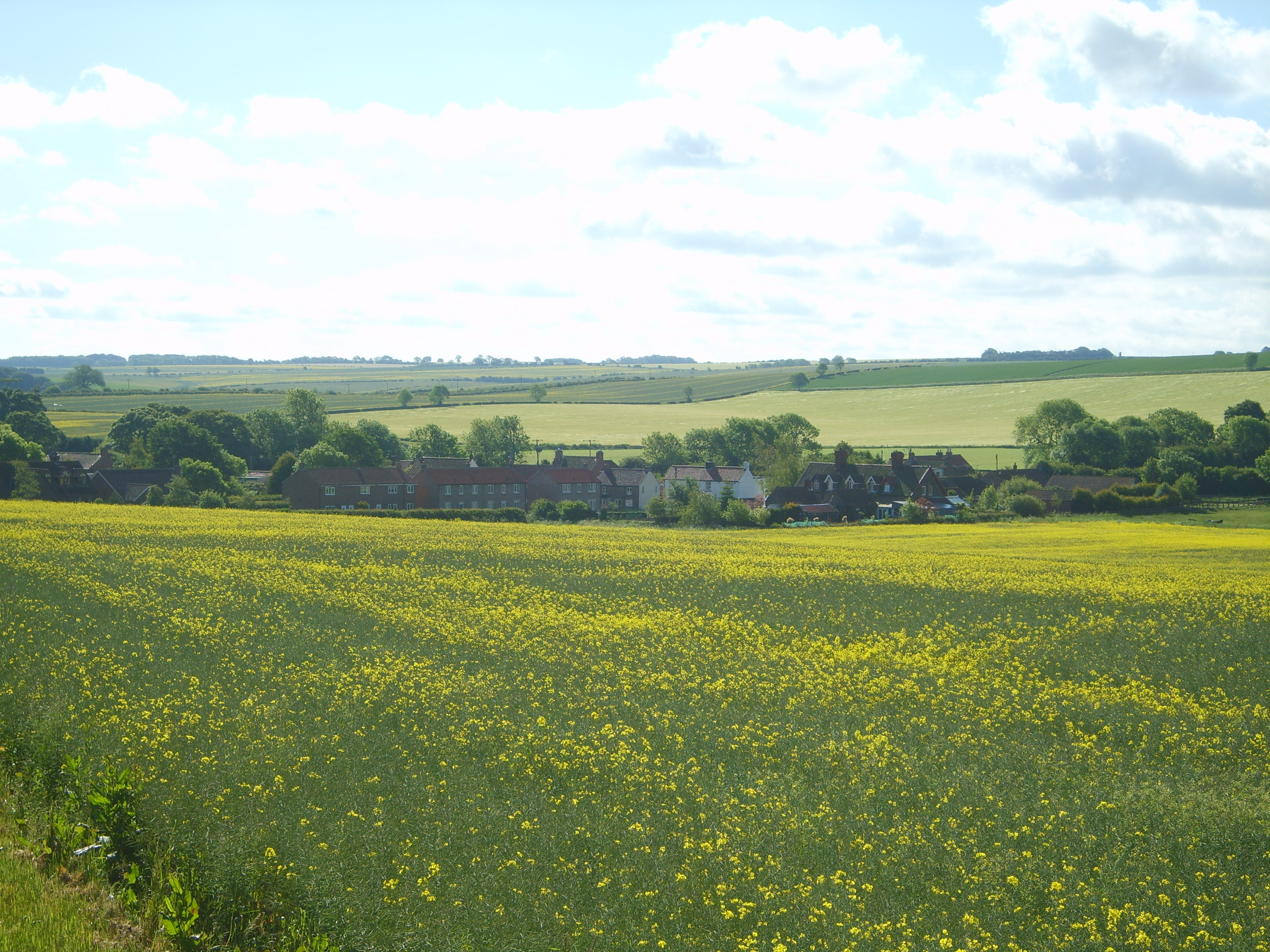
West Lutton from Malton Lane

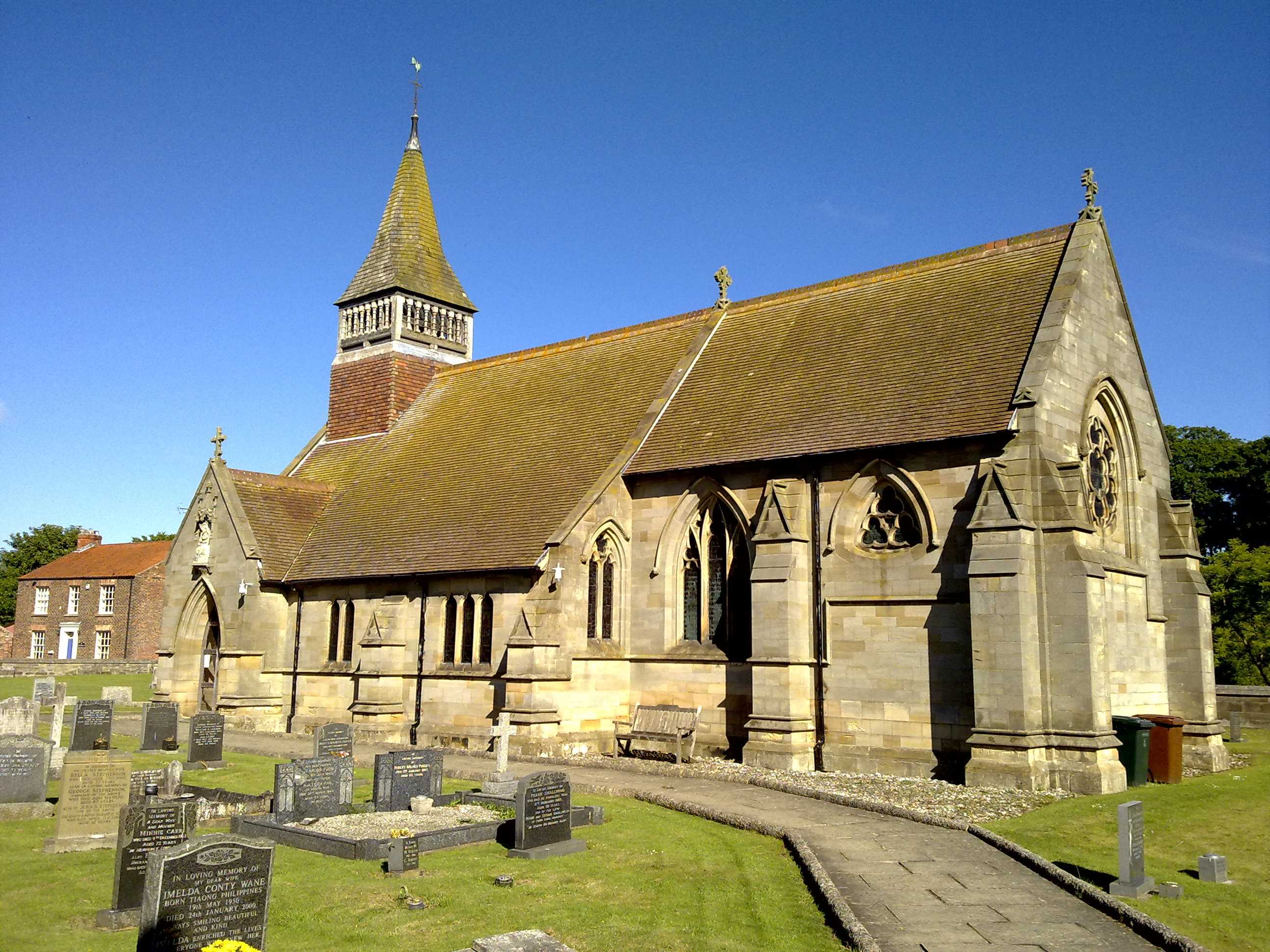
St Mary's Church, West Lutton

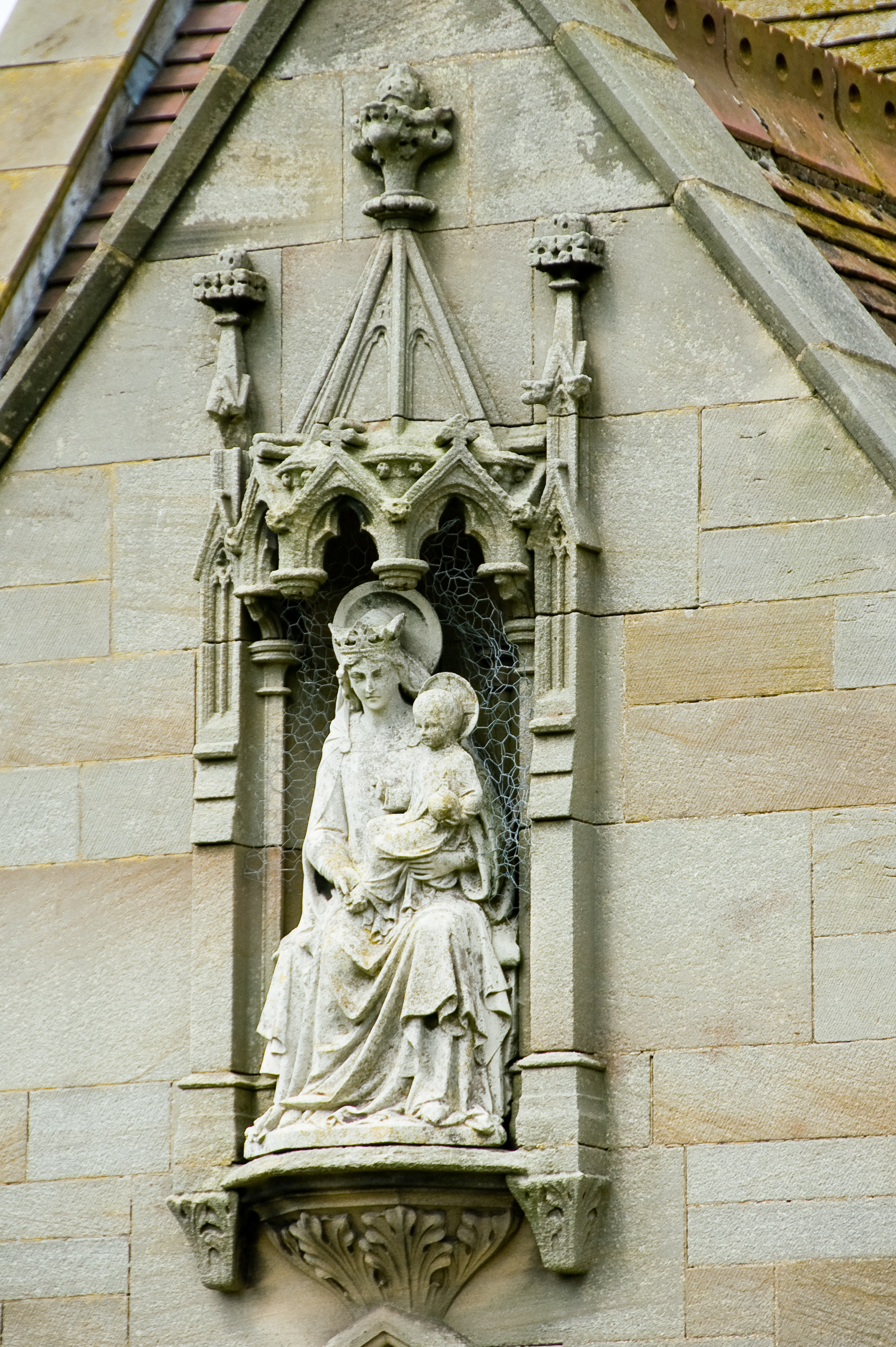
Sculpture by James Redfern
