= Listed buildings in Burton Fleming =

Burton Fleming is a civil parish in the county of the East Riding of Yorkshire, England. It contains seven listed buildings that are recorded in the National Heritage List for England. Of these, one is listed at Grade II*, the middle of the three grades, and the others are at Grade II, the lowest grade. The parish contains the village of Burton Fleming and the surrounding countryside. All the listed buildings are in the village, and consist of a church, houses and farmhouses, and a war memorial.

== Key ==
Grade	Criteria
II*	Particularly important buildings of more than special interest
II	Buildings of national importance and special interest

== Buildings ==
Name and location	Photograph	Date	Notes	Grade
St Cuthbert's Church; 54.13574°N 0.34317°W		12th century	The church has been altered and extended through the centuries. It is built in stone, with repairs in cobble and brick, and has tile roofs. The church consists of a nave, a south porch, a chancel and a west tower. The tower has four stages, a chamfered plinth, massive buttresses, a two-light west window, string courses, a south clock face, lancet bell openings with decorated surrounds, and a coped parapet. The south doorway is re-set, and incorporates 12th century attached columns with water-leaf capitals.	II*
The Manor House; 54.13687°N 0.34393°W	—	Early 17th century	The house is in rendered chalk, with stone dressings and a tile roof. There are two storeys, and an L-shaped plan, with a front range of three bays. The front and sides were altered in the 19th century. The rear has a chamfered plinth, massive stone quoins, and sprocketed eaves. The windows have double chamfered surround, and mullions.	II
House south of St Cuthbert's Church; 54.13494°N 0.34344°W		18th century	The house is in stone and chalk, with a stepped eaves cornice, and a pantile roof. There are two storeys and four bays. The doorway has a plain surround and a rectangular fanlight, and the windows are sashes.	II
Mere Farmhouse; 54.13655°N 0.34217°W		Late 18th century	The farmhouse is rendered chalk, and has a pantile roof. There are two storeys and two bays. The central doorway has a wooden architrave and a divided fanlight, and the windows are sashes.	II
Village Farmhouse; 54.13591°N 0.34373°W	—	Late 18th century	The farmhouse is in red brick, with timber eaves brackets and a pantile roof. There are two storeys and three bays. The central doorway has pilasters with roundels, panelled reveals, a semicircular fanlight with radial glazing, and an open dentilled pediment. The windows are sashes.	II
North Burton Hall; 54.13582°N 0.34232°W		Early 19th century	The house is rendered, and has twin pilaster strips at the angles, a chamfered eaves cornice and a hipped slate roof. There are two storeys and an L-shaped plan, with a front range of seven bays. On the fifth bay is a porch with square columns, side windows and a chamfered cornice, above which is a balcony with ornate cast iron railings and a double door. The windows are sashes in plain surrounds.	II
War memorial 54.13516°N 0.34316°W		c. 1920	The war memorial on the triangular village green is in granite, and consists of a simple Latin cross on a four-stepped base. On the plinth and steps are inscriptions and the names of those lost in the two World Wars in lead lettering.	II
