= Listed buildings in Thixendale =

Thixendale is a civil parish in the county of North Yorkshire, England. It contains six listed buildings that are recorded in the National Heritage List for England. Of these, one is listed at Grade II*, the middle of the three grades, and the others are at Grade II, the lowest grade. The parish contains the village of Thixendale and the surrounding area, and all the listed buildings are in the village. Five of these were designed by G. E. Street, consisting of the church, a cross in the churchyard, the lychgate, the vicarage, and the village school and master's house, the other being an older cottage.

== Key ==
Grade	Criteria
II*	Particularly important buildings of more than special interest
II	Buildings of national importance and special interest

== Buildings ==
Name and location	Photograph	Date	Notes	Grade
Round the Bend; 54.03829°N 0.71145°W		Early 18th century	A cottage in whitewashed stone with a pantile roof. There is a single storey with attics, and a rounded corner at the rear. On the front are sash windows, and two flat-roofed dormers with casements.	II
St Mary's Church; 54.03876°N 0.71546°W		1868–70	The church was designed by G. E. Street, and the vestry was added in 1875. The church is built in stone with a tile roof, and consists of a three-bay nave, a south aisle, a north porch, a two-bay chancel and a north vestry. At the west end is an apsidal baptistry above which is a rose window. On the east end of the nave is a bellcote.	II*
The Old Vicarage; 54.03852°N 0.71487°W	—	1870	The vicarage, designed by G. E. Street, is in brick with stone dressings, a floor band, and a tile roof with gable coping and decorative ridge tiles. There are two storeys, and on the front is a recessed porch with a pointed arch, a single-light window to the left, and a three-light mullioned window in a relieving arch to the right. On the upper floor is a half-dormer in a gablet.	II
Churchyard cross 54.03893°N 0.71546°W		c. 1874	The cross in the churchyard of St Mary's Church, to the north of the church, was designed by G. E. Street. It is in stone, and has an octagonal platform of three steps, the upper stage with blind traceried panels. On this is a round stepped base, a fluted shaft, and a cross with a bird motif. On the base is an inscribed and dated copper plaque.	II
Lychgate, St Mary's Church; 54.03899°N 0.71545°W		1874	The lychgate at the entrance to the churchyard was designed by G. E. Street. It is in stone, and has a roof of wood and tile. It consists of a pointed arch flanked by semicircular buttresses, and has a coved eaves course and sprocketed eaves. The gable ends have decorative openwork.	II
Village Hall and Dunelm; 54.03901°N 0.71604°W		1874–76	A school and schoolmaster's house designed by G. E. Street, later used for other purposes. The building is in brick with stone dressings, tile hanging and tile roofs, with the house on the left and the former school on the right. The house has two storeys, one gabled bay facing the road, and an outshut on the left. On the front is a doorway, to its right is a four-light fixed window, and above is a four-light casement window. The school has one storey, a lower extension to the right with a hipped roof containing a doorway, and on the roof is a tall bell turret with a Welsh slate roof.	II
