= Listed buildings in Wharram =

Wharram is a civil parish in the county of North Yorkshire, England. It contains five listed buildings that are recorded in the National Heritage List for England. Of these, one is listed at Grade I, the highest of the three grades, one is at Grade II*, the middle grade, and the others are at Grade II, the lowest grade. The parish contains the village of Wharram-le-Street, the deserted medieval village of Wharram Percy, and the surrounding countryside. The listed buildings consist of two churches, one ruined, and three houses and associated structures.

== Key ==
Grade	Criteria
I	Buildings of exceptional interest, sometimes considered to be internationally important
II*	Particularly important buildings of more than special interest
II	Buildings of national importance and special interest

== Buildings ==
Name and location	Photograph	Date	Notes	Grade
St Martin's Church; 54.06673°N 0.69012°W		10th century	The church, with dates mainly from the 12th to the 16th century, is now in ruins, and is in the deserted medieval village of Wharram Percy. It is built in limestone, and is roofless apart from the chancel, which has a Westmorland slate roof. The church consists of a nave with a south porch, a chancel, and a west tower. The tower, which has partly collapsed, has two-light bell openings, part of an embattled parapet and a crocketed pinnacle. The south porch has a 13th-century doorway with a pointed moulded arch on responds with stiff-leaf capitals.	II*
St Mary's Church; 54.08205°N 0.68096°W		Late 11th to early 12th century	The church has been altered and extended through the centuries, including a restoration and addition of the porch in 1862–64. It is built in sandstone with a Welsh slate roof, and consists of a nave, a north aisle, a south porch, a chancel and a west tower. The tower has four stages, a blocked round-headed doorway with two moulded orders on narrow shafts with pendant triangle capitals, slit windows, a string course, double round-headed bell openings and a parapet, slightly corbelled out. The south porch contains a Norman round arched doorway with five orders, a volute capital to the left and a fluted capital to the right.	I
Raisthorpe Manor; 54.04376°N 0.69644°W		Mid to late 18th century	The house, which was extended in 1867, is in sandstone and limestone, the cross-wing is in brick and the roofs are in Welsh slate with gable coping. There are two storeys, three bays, and flanking single-storey wings. The house has a dentilled eaves course, a central doorway with a radial fanlight, and a dentilled open pediment, and the windows are sashes with channelled wedge lintels. The left wing has sash windows, on the right wing is a board door, and both wings have plain ramped parapets with urns on the angles.	II
Forge House, stables and forge 54.08249°N 0.67983°W	—	c. 1800	The house and adjoining buildings are in sandstone, the house with a roof of French tiles, and the outbuildings with pantile roofs. The house has a stepped eaves course, two storeys and three bays. Steps lead up to the central doorway with a fanlight, and the windows are casements. The outbuildings have a single storey. The stables to the left have sprocketed eaves and two stable doors, and the forge to the right has a wide doorway and a horizontally sliding sash window.	II
Wharram Percy House; 54.06043°N 0.70685°W	—	Late 1840s	The house is in brick, with a floor band, wide eaves, and an overhanging hipped Welsh slate roof. There are two storeys and five bays, the outer bays flanked by buttresses with recessed bands. In the centre is a round-headed porch and a recessed doorway with a fanlight. The windows are sashes, all with flat brick arches, and those on the outer bays tripartite with triglyphs to dividing jambs.	II
