= Helperthorpe =

Village in North Yorkshire, England

Coordinates: 54°07′11″N 0°32′36″W

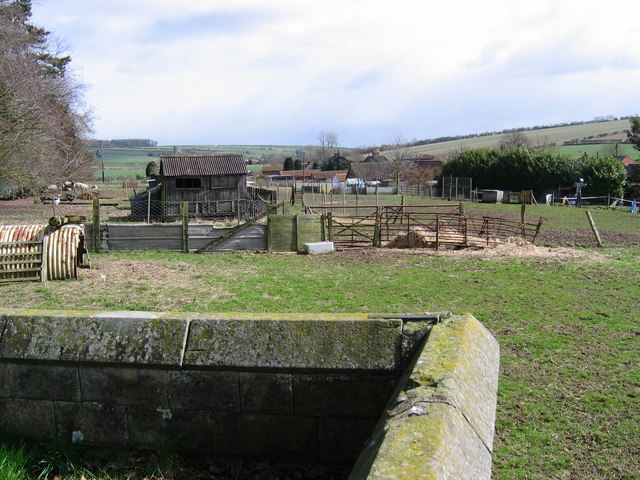
- Looking north-east from the grounds of St Peter's Church

- Location within North Yorkshire
- OS grid reference: SE953703
- Civil parish: Luttons
- Unitary authority: North Yorkshire
- Ceremonial county: North Yorkshire
- Region: Yorkshire and the Humber
- Country: England
- Sovereign state: United Kingdom
- Post town: MALTON
- Postcode district: YO17
- Police: North Yorkshire
- Fire: North Yorkshire
- Ambulance: Yorkshire
- UK Parliament: Thirsk and Malton

Helperthorpe is a village in the civil parish of Luttons, in North Yorkshire, England. The village lies in the Great Wold Valley and the course of the winterbourne stream the Gypsey Race passes through it.

The village is 10 miles (16 km) north west of Driffield and 10 miles (16 km) east of Malton.

In 1931 the parish had a population of 123. On 1 April 1935 the parish was abolished and merged with Luttons Ambo to form "Luttons", The population of the Luttons at the 2011 census was 411, with an estimated population of 430 in 2015.

== History ==
The village is mentioned in the Domesday Book, where it had five households and a church. It is one of the Thankful Villages that suffered no fatalities during the Great War of 1914 to 1918. The village is featured on Darren Hayman's album, Thankful Villages Volume 3.

Until 1974 the village lay in the historic county boundaries of the East Riding of Yorkshire. From 1974 to 2023 it was part of the district of Ryedale, it is now administered by the unitary North Yorkshire Council.

== Parish church ==
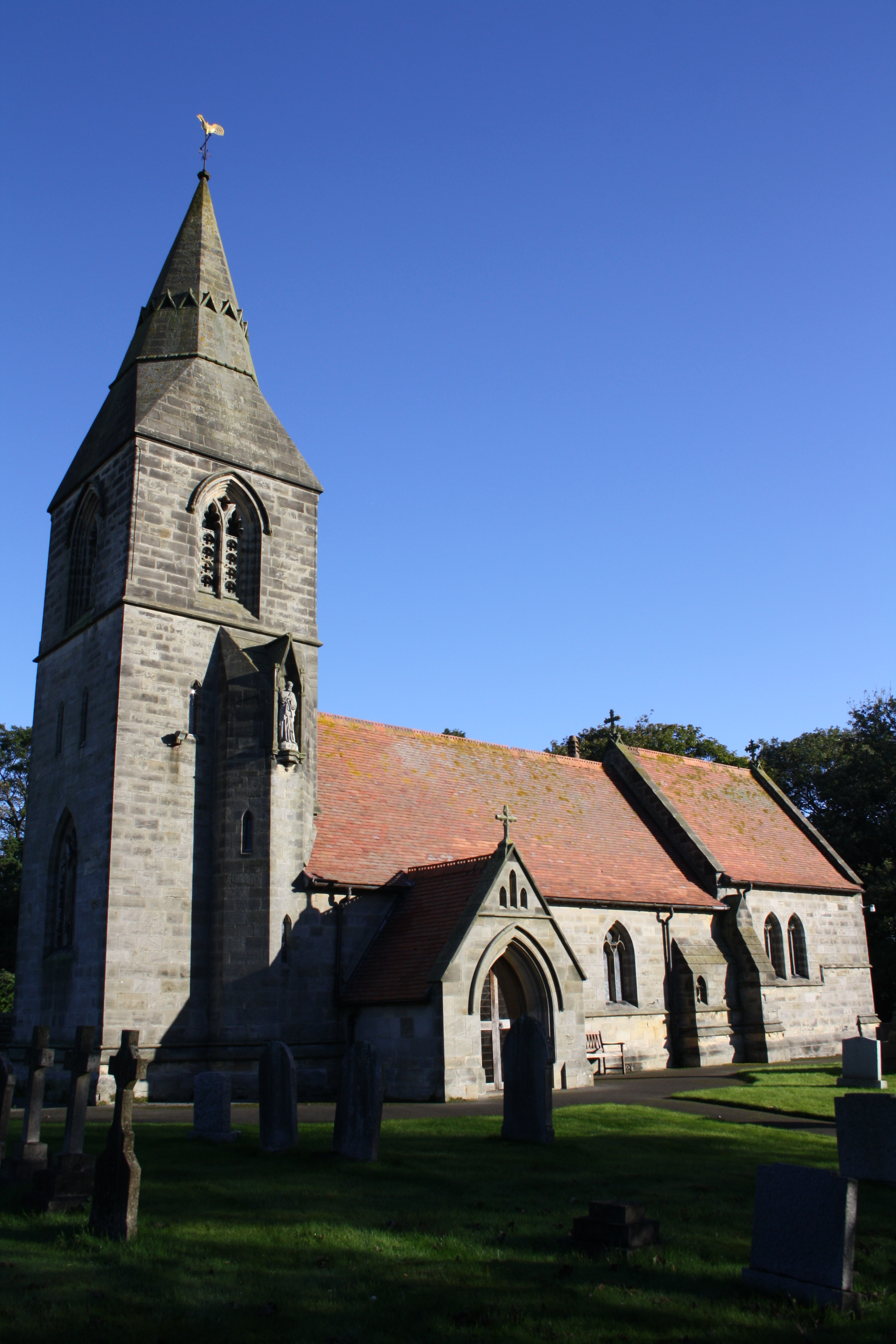
St Peter's Church

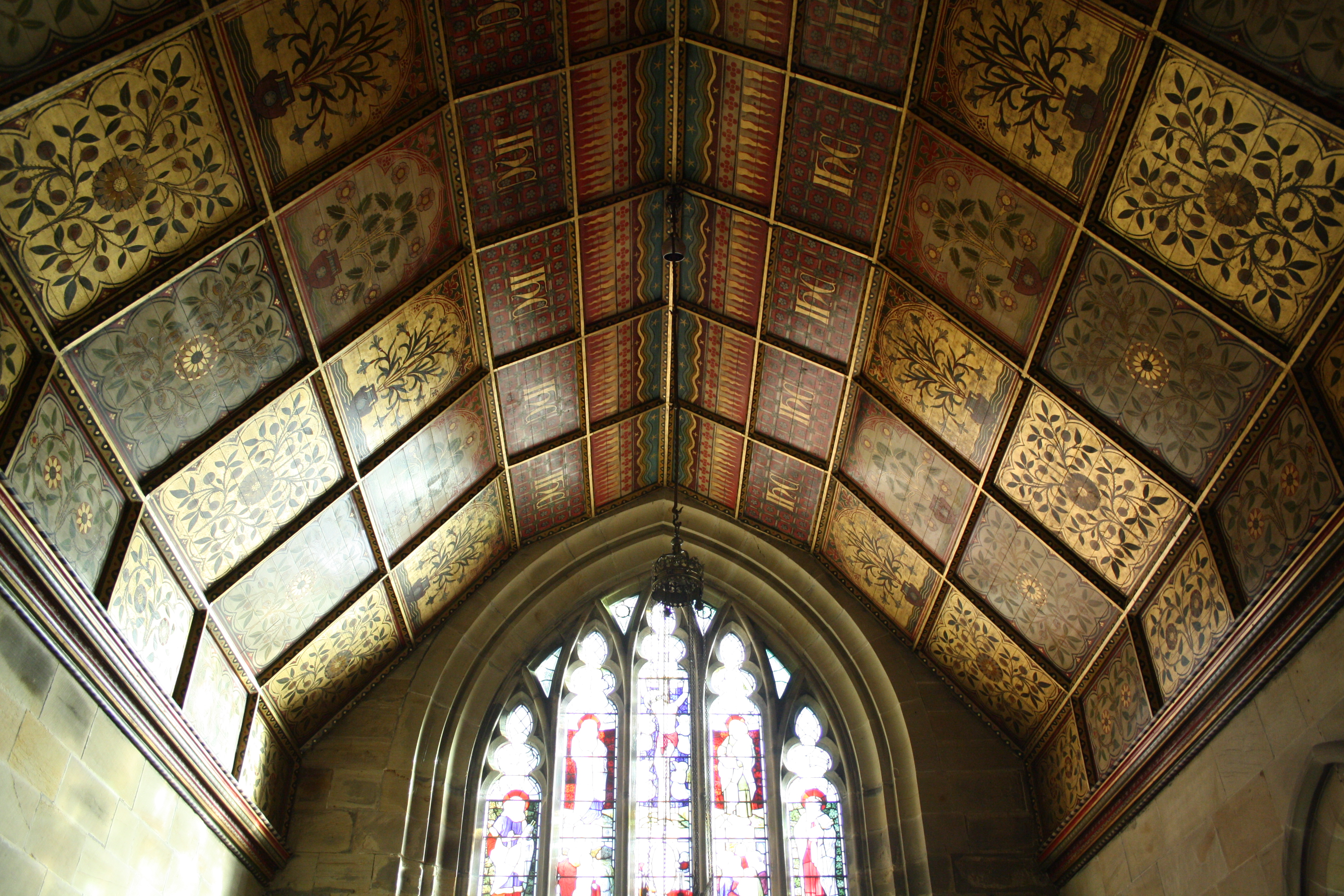
Interior of St Peter's Church

St Peter's Church, Helperthorpe was until the late 19th century a medieval building. In 1871–73 it was rebuilt by Sir Tatton Sykes of Sledmere. The architect for the new building was G. E. Street who included a spire based on the English Gothic of c. 1300. There are three richly decorated roofs over the nave, chancel and ground floor of the tower (the latter being used as the baptistery). A full set of stained glass windows was supplied by Clayton & Bell but this was replaced less than 20 years later. The irreparably damaged font was buried in the floor below a new one.

== See also ==
- Listed buildings in Luttons
