= Gypsey Race =

River in the East Riding, Yorkshire, England

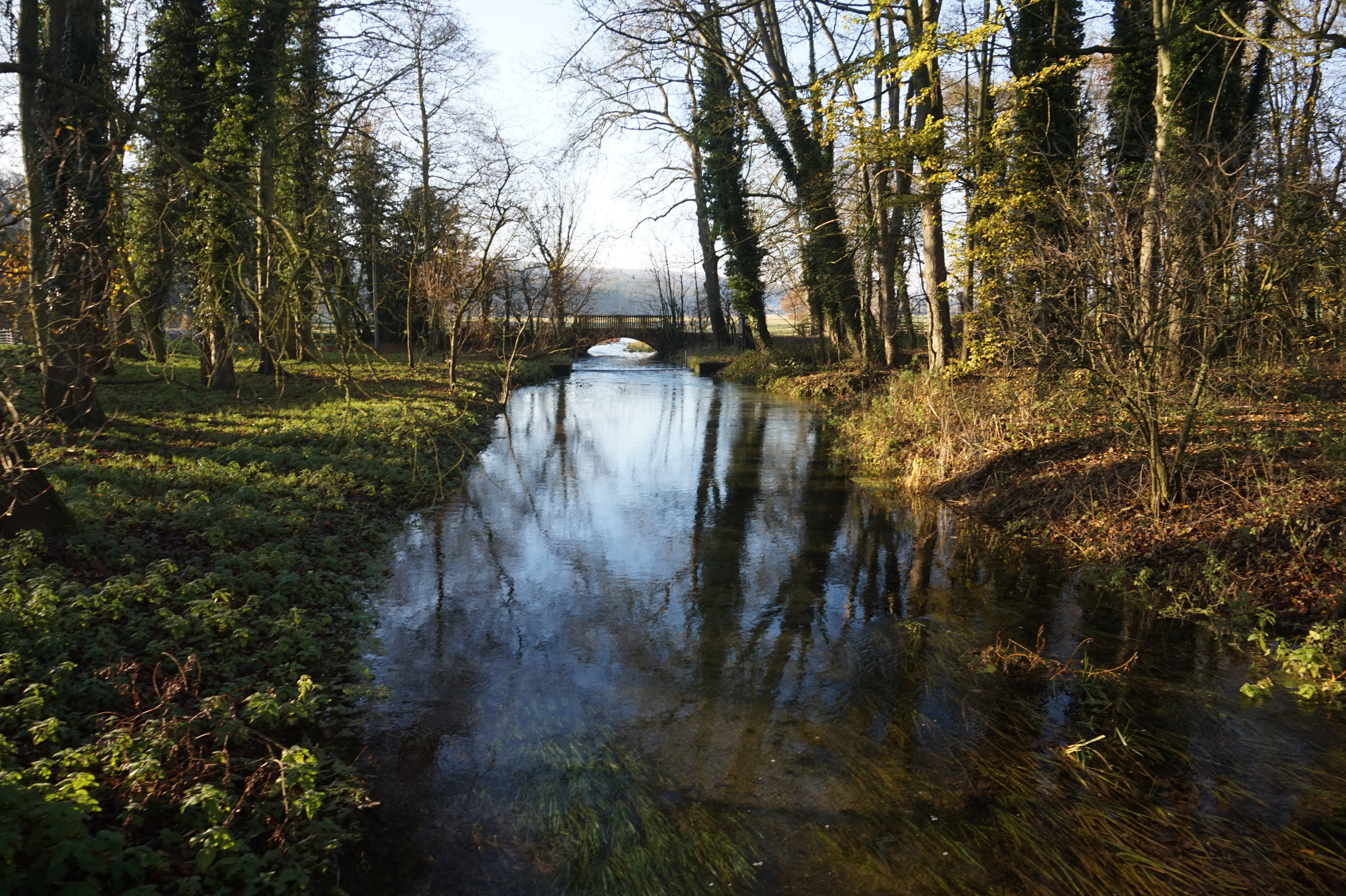
- The Gypsey Race at Boynton

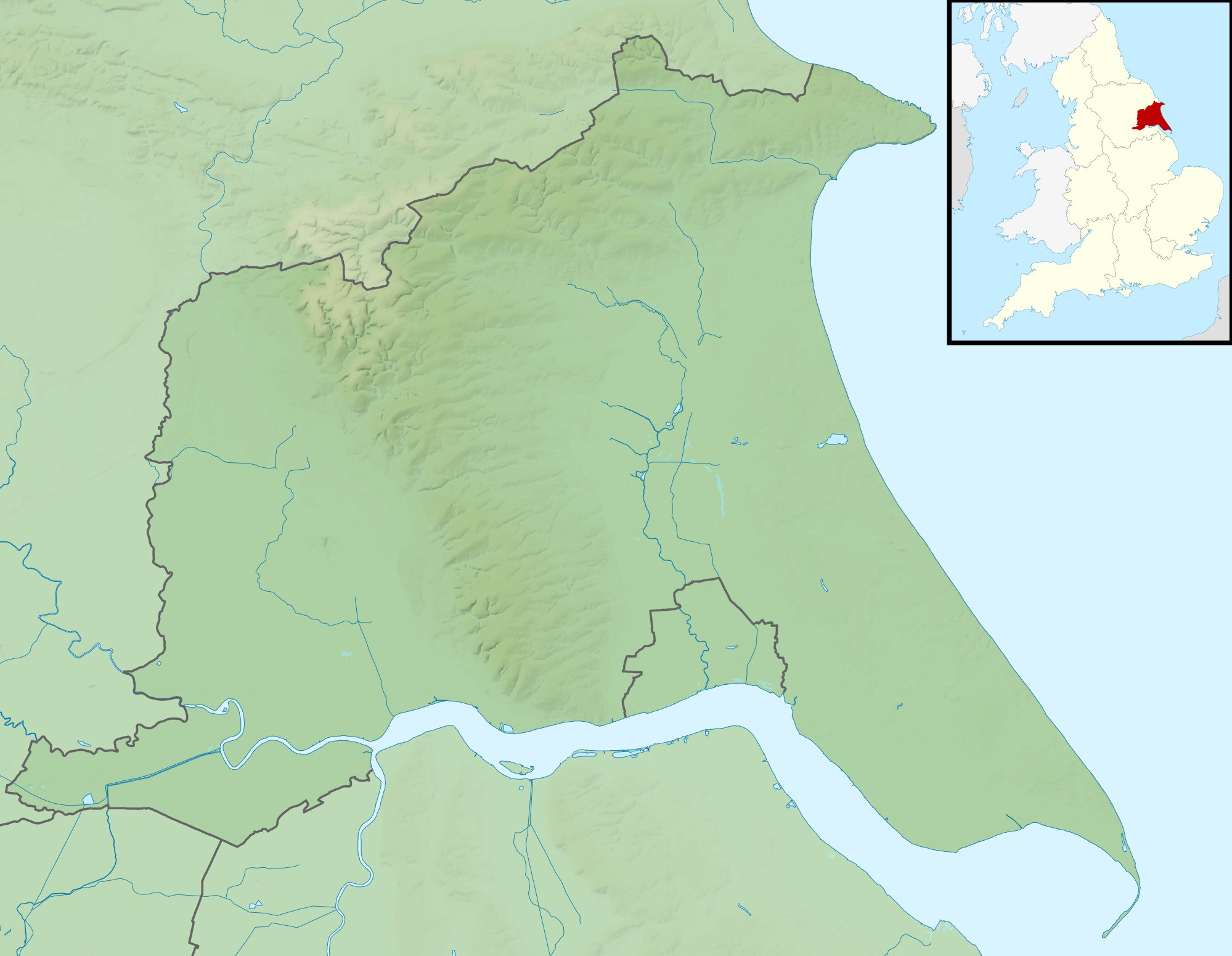
- Location of the mouth shown within the East Riding of Yorkshire

Location
- Country: England

Physical characteristics
- Source
  - location: Duggleby
  - coordinates: 54°5′21″N 0°39′33″W
  - elevation: 114 metres (374 ft)
- Mouth
  - location: North Sea at Bridlington
  - coordinates: 54°4′52″N 0°11′27″W
- Length: 41.4 kilometres (25.7 mi)
- Basin size: 265.5 square kilometres (102.5 sq mi)

The Gypsey Race (Note: The name Gypsey may mean "yawn(ing) stream", from Old English *gips ea. The word race means "channel" or "rush of water", from Old Norse rás.) is a winterbourne stream in the Yorkshire Wolds. It rises to the east of Wharram-le-Street and flows through the villages of Duggleby, Kirby Grindalythe, West Lutton, East Lutton, Helperthorpe, Weaverthorpe, Butterwick, Foxholes, Wold Newton, Burton Fleming, Rudston and Boynton before emptying into the North Sea at Bridlington Harbour. It is the most northerly of the Yorkshire chalk streams.

The Gypsey Race rises in the Great Wold Valley through a series of springs and flows intermittently between Duggleby and West Lutton, where it runs underground in the chalk aquifer before re-surfacing in Rudston. It has been known during very wet conditions for the stream to reappear at Wold Newton, some 4.3 miles (7 km) north-west of Rudston. Water from the aquifer running between West Lutton and Wold Newton also heads south to reappear at Elmswell, feeding West Beck and the River Hull.

According to folklore, when the Gypsey Race is flowing in flood (the Woe Waters), bad fortune is at hand. It was in flood in the year before the Great Plague of 1665–66, the restoration of Charles II (1660) and the landing of William of Orange (1688), before both World War One and World War Two, plus the bad winters of 1947 and 1962.

The stream also badly flooded the village of Burton Fleming in 2012, when the water was 2 feet (0.61 m) deep in places.

Villagers in Boynton have an annual duck race on the stream in May. Hundreds of yellow plastic ducks are paid for and race the Race in aid of funds for the village hall.

== Pictures ==
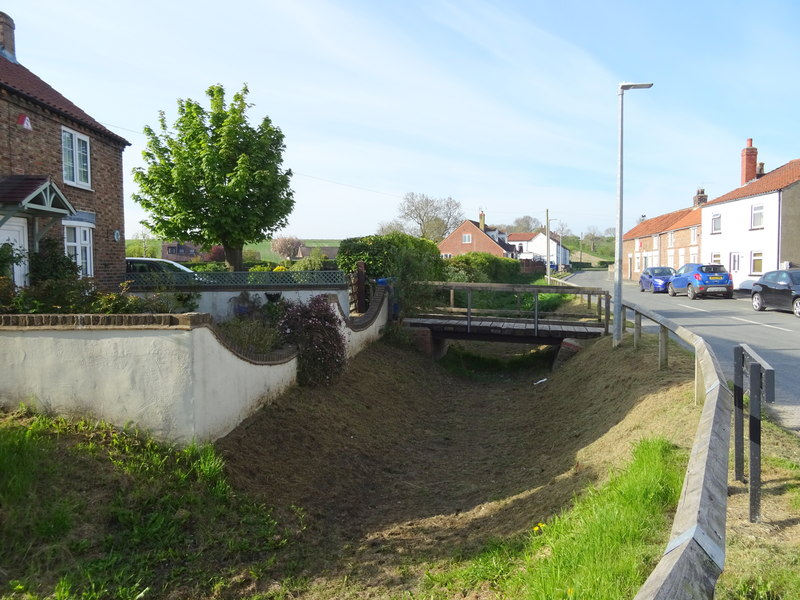
The bed of the Gypsey Race during a dry spell

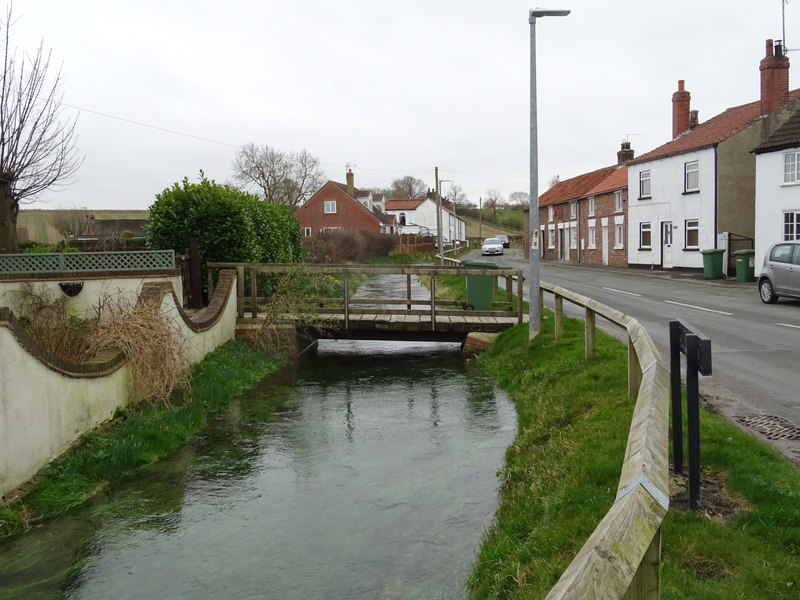
The same view in wet weather

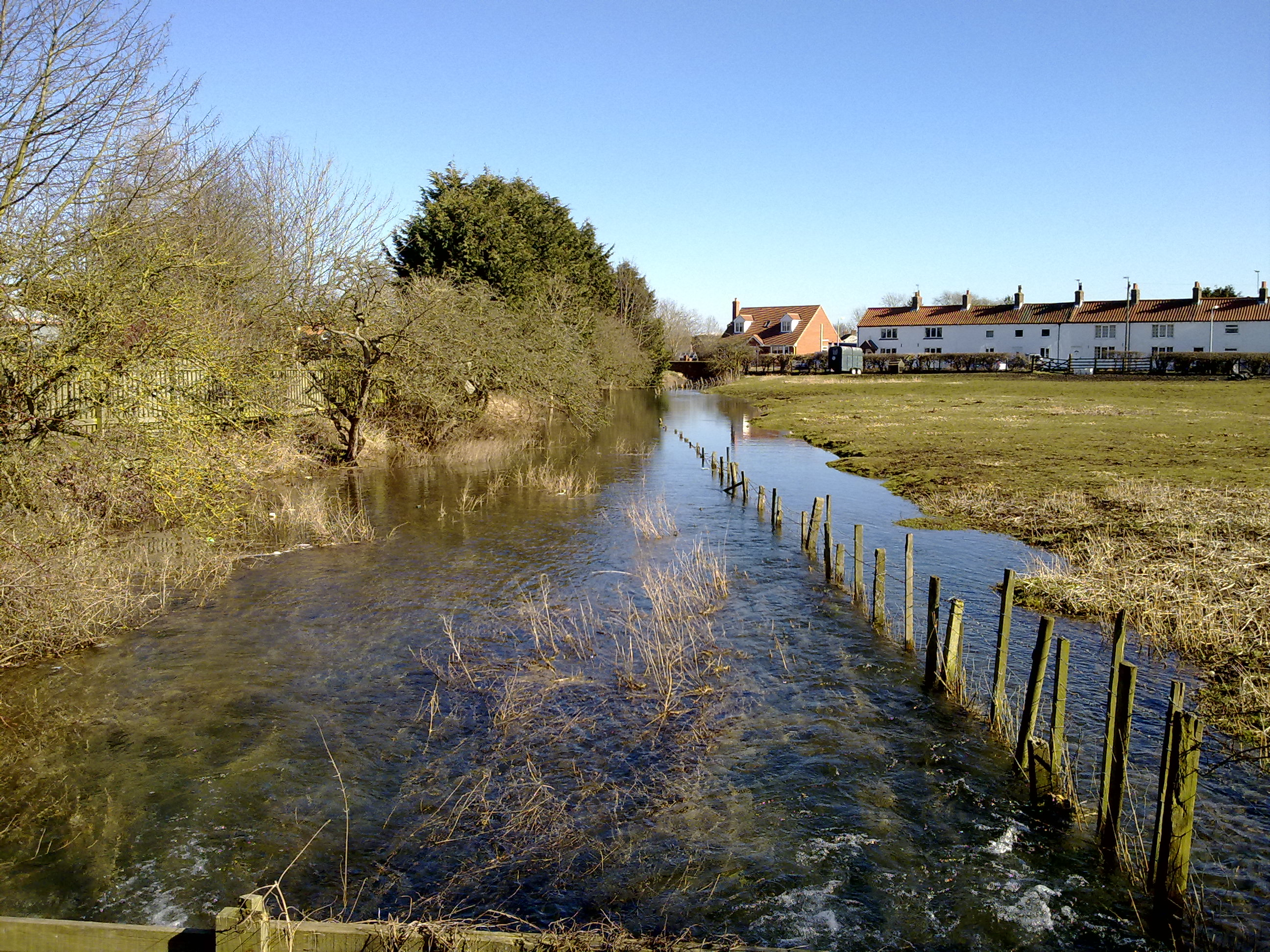
The stream in flood at Burton Fleming

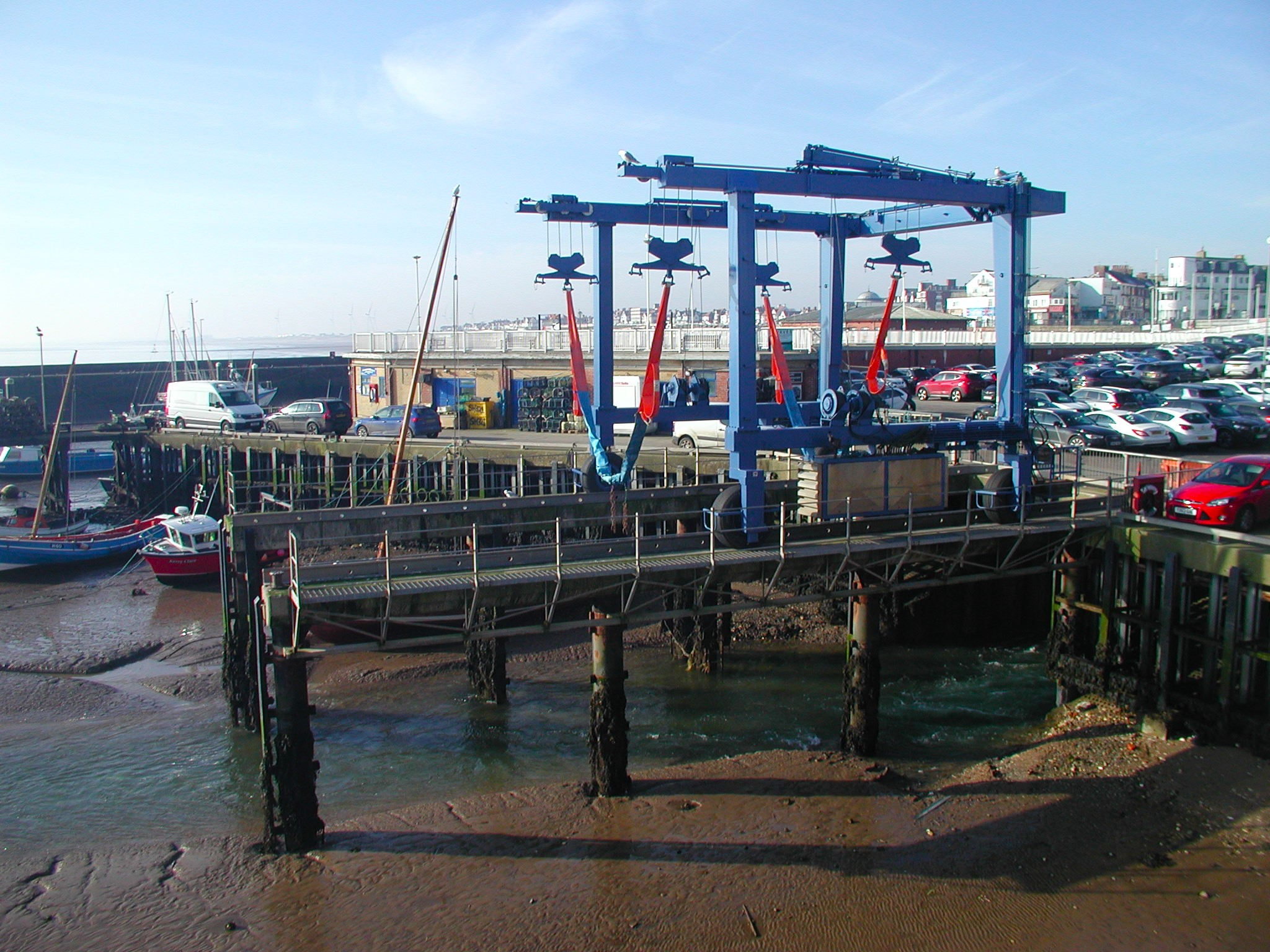
The stream entering Bridlington Harbour, beneath a ship lift
