= St Cuthbert's Church, Burton Fleming =

Church in Burton Fleming, East Riding of Yorkshire, England

Coordinates: 54°08′09″N 0°20′36″W

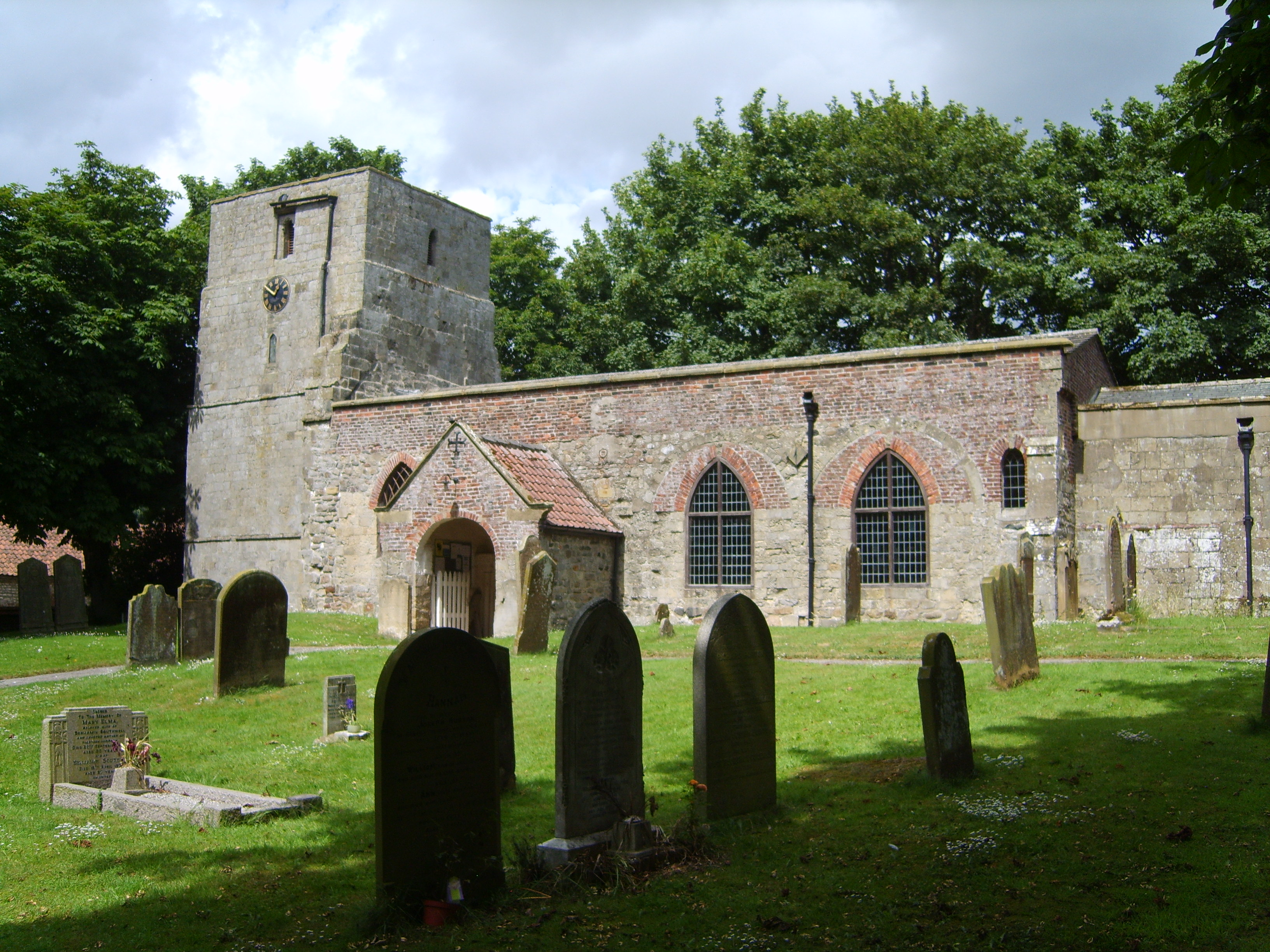
The church, in 2009

St Cuthbert's Church is the parish church of Burton Fleming, a village in the East Riding of Yorkshire, in England.

The church was built in the 12th century, from which period the chancel arch, nave arcade, and part of the south doorway survive. A tower was added in the early 13th century. The nave, chancel and porch were largely rebuilt in the 17th and 18th centuries, the work including demolition of the south aisle of the nave. The building was grade II* listed in 1966.

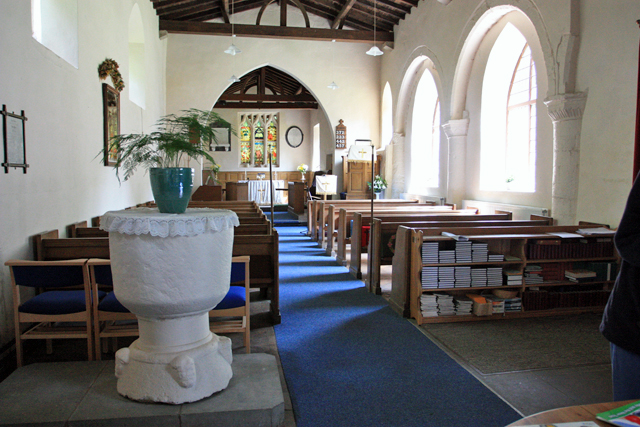
Internal view, looking east

The church is built of stone, with repairs in cobble and brick, and has tile roofs. The church consists of a nave, a south porch, a chancel and a west tower. The tower has four stages, a chamfered plinth, massive buttresses, a two-light west window, string courses, a south clock face, lancet bell openings with decorated surrounds, and a coped parapet. The south doorway is re-set, and incorporates 12th century attached columns with water-leaf capitals. Inside, there is a 12th-century tub font, and a royal coat of arms dating from 1724.

== See also ==
- Grade II* listed buildings in the East Riding of Yorkshire
- Listed buildings in Burton Fleming
