= St Peter's Church, Helperthorpe =

Church in Helperthorpe, North Yorkshire, England

Coordinates: 54°07′15″N 0°32′38″W

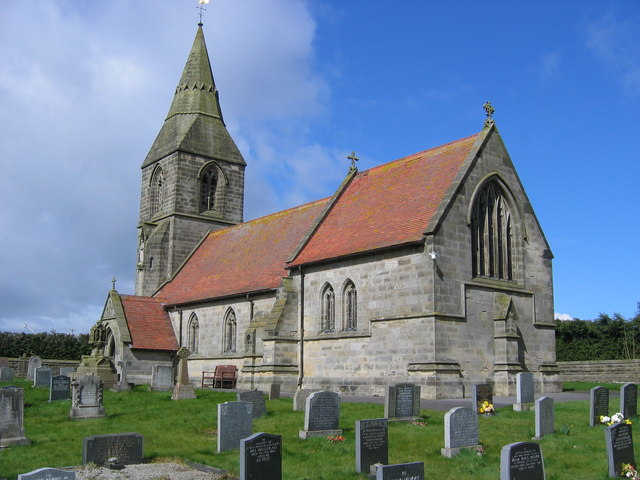
The church, in 2006

St Peter's Church is the parish church of Helperthorpe, a village in North Yorkshire, in England.

A church was first recorded in Helperthorpe in the 12th century. A new building was constructed in the 16th century, and was restored in 1829, producing what was described as "a small edifice with a low tower". By 1851 it was recorded as having only one regular worshipper, so the church was demolished and the parish merged into that of St Andrew's Church, Weaverthorpe. Between 1872 and 1875, a new chapel of ease was constructed, commissioned by Sir Tatton Sykes, 5th Baronet. It was designed by George Edmund Street, who also designed a vicarage. In 1893, Temple Moore added a north aisle and a vestry. The building was grade II listed in 1966.

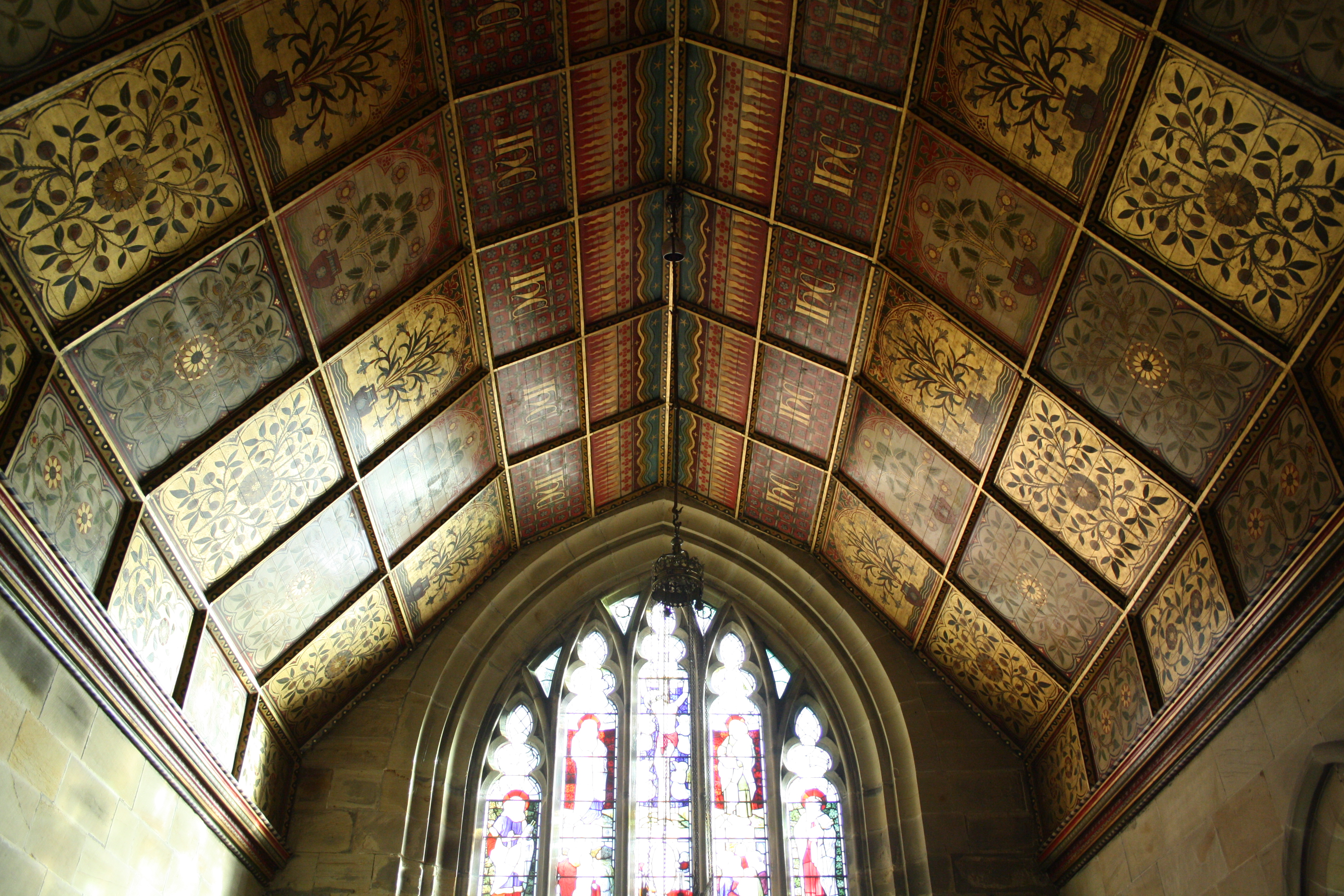
The ceiling

The church is built of sandstone on a chamfered plinth, with a tile roof. The church consists of a nave, a north aisle, a south porch, a chancel and a vestry, and a west steeple. The steeple has a tower with three stages on a moulded plinth, with a three-light west window, a string course, pointed bell openings with hood moulds, and a broach spire with bands, gablets and a weathercock. To the southeast of the tower is a half-hexagonal stair turret containing a statue in a niche under a gabled canopy. Inside, there is a circular baptismal font with a wood and iron cover, a stone pulpit and altar piece, and a wrought iron chancel screen. The pews were designed by Temple Moore, and the stained glass by Burlison and Grylls.

== See also ==
- Listed buildings in Luttons
