= Yorkshire Wolds =

Area of East Riding of Yorkshire, England

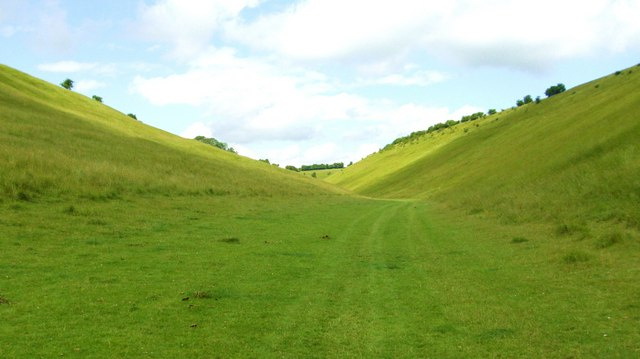
- View from Yorkshire Wolds Way near Driffield

Highest point
- Coordinates: 54.006°N 0.440°W

Geography
- Location within Northern England
- Location: Northern England

The Yorkshire Wolds are a group of low hills in East and North Yorkshire, England. They are the northernmost chalk hills in Great Britain and contain the northernmost chalk stream in Europe, the Gypsey Race.

On the western edge, the Wolds rise to an escarpment which then drops sharply to the Vale of York. The highest point on the escarpment is Bishop Wilton Wold (also known as Garrowby Hill), which is 807 feet (246 m) above sea level. To the north, on the other side of the Vale of Pickering, lie the North York Moors, and to the east the hills flatten into the plain of Holderness. The hills are separated by many dry dales, formed during the last ice age and where many springs rise.

The largest town in the Wolds is Driffield, with other places including Pocklington, Thixendale and Kilham, the original 'capital' of the Wolds. The highest village on the Yorkshire Wolds is Fridaythorpe at 550 feet (170 m) above sea level. The market town of Beverley lies on the eastern slopes, along with the village of Molescroft.

On 8 October 2024, Natural England launched a statutory and public consultation for proposed plans to designate part of the Yorkshire Wolds as an Area of Outstanding Natural Beauty (AONB).

== Geology ==
The hills are formed from a series of pure marine limestones formed during the Cretaceous period, known collectively as the Chalk Group. The outcrop has the form of an arc running north from Ferriby on the Humber estuary west of Hull northwards past Market Weighton to the Malton area where it swings eastwards towards the North Sea coast between Filey and Bridlington. Here the Chalk forms cliffs, most notably at Speeton Cliffs, Bempton Cliffs and Flamborough; Flamborough Headland is designated a Heritage Coast. To the south of the Humber Gap, where the chalk provides stable footings for the Humber Bridge, the same formations continue as the Lincolnshire Wolds. The rock succession in stratigraphic order i.e. youngest/uppermost first, is this:

- White Chalk Subgroup
  - Flamborough Chalk Formation
  - Burnham Chalk formation
  - Welton Chalk Formation
- Grey Chalk Subgroup
  - Ferriby Chalk Formation
  - Hunstanton Chalk Formation

The thin Hunstanton Chalk and Ferriby Chalk formations form the lower parts of the west and north facing Wolds scarp but it is the overlying Welton Chalk Formation which forms the greater part of these slopes. The Burnham Chalk and Flamborough Chalk formations characterise the incised plateau surface and easterly dip-slope down to the North Sea coast. In the north the Chalk rises above the Speeton Clay Formation which underlies The Carrs and above the Ampthill Clay and Kimmeridge Clay of the Vale of Pickering. Further south and particularly to the south of Market Weighton, the lowermost part of the scarp and the vale to the west is formed from a great variety of Jurassic age strata. A fault which downthrows the rock strata to the west effectively truncates the Wolds at Hunmanby in the northeast, though the offset chalk outcrop continues east to the coast at Speeton Cliffs. The numerous dry valleys cut into the dip-slope are typically floored by head, locally derived clay, silt, sand and gravel. Unlike surrounding areas, the Wolds are free from glacial till as, other than along the coastal zone, the area was not inundated by ice during the last ice age.

== Natural history ==
Most of the area takes the form of an elevated, gently rolling plateau, cut by numerous deep, steep-sided, flat-bottomed valleys of glacial origin. The chalk formation of the hills provides exceptionally good drainage, with the result that most of these valleys are dry; indeed, surface water is quite scarce throughout the Wolds. Typically the valleys are hard to see from above, creating the visual impression that the landscape is much flatter than is actually the case. The unusual topography results in an "upside-down" farming system – livestock (mostly sheep and cows) graze the valleys, with the hills above used for crops.

== Climate ==
Located in the northern part of England, UK, the Yorkshire Wolds have a temperate maritime climate which is dominated by the passage of mid latitude depressions. The weather is very changeable from day to day and the warming influence of the Gulf Stream makes the region mild for its latitude. The higher ground of the Wolds results in their being slightly cooler than the surrounding lowland areas and drifting snow is a problem in winter. The average total annual rainfall is 729 mm (28.7 in) with rain falling on average 128 days of the year. January is usually the coldest month and December the wettest. The warmest month is August and the driest is February.

Sunshine and rainfall recordings made at High Mowthorpe on the western scarp of the Wolds

Temperature recordings made at High Mowthorpe on the western scarp of the Wolds

== Areas and notable settlements ==
Map of the northern area of the Yorkshire Wolds

=== Northern Wolds and Flamborough Head ===
The Wolds reach the sea at Flamborough Head, where the chalk cliffs plunge over 430 feet (130 m) to the North Sea. To the south of Flamborough lies the resort town of Bridlington and to the north the sheer cliffs at Speeton overlook Filey Bay. Inland the high Wolds scarp overlooks the Vale of Pickering.

The so-called Great Wold Valley traverses the area. It is occupied by a small brook called the Gypsey Race. This brook empties its waters into Bridlington Harbour. The valley of the Gypsey Race turns south and then east in two right angle bends, one at Burton Fleming, the other at Rudston. In dry conditions the brook frequently dries up in parts of its course and re-emerges downstream.

Another notable feature of this area of the Wolds is Danes Dyke, a great ditch extending across Flamborough Head. The dyke consists of double ramparts, a ditch which is about 20 yards (18 m) wide and 20 feet (6 m) deep and a further rampart which rises to 18 feet (5 m) above ground level. The origin of this feature is obscure, although it is certainly not Danish.

Bempton Cliffs is a seabird colony and an RSPB nature reserve. It is home to the only colony of gannets in mainland England, 10% of the UK's resident kittiwakes, and a colony of the locally endangered Atlantic puffin.

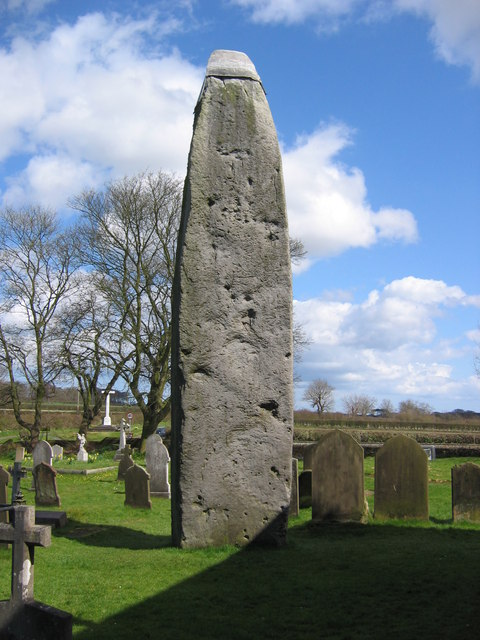
The Rudston Monolith. Britain's tallest standing stone.

Notable settlements include Flamborough village, North Landing and South Landing on Flamborough Headland. The village of Reighton which extends down the steep scarp face of the Wolds has many buildings made of the local chalk. Hunmanby was once a large market town and its buildings are centred on the old triangular market place. A series of villages lies at the foot of the northern scarp of the Wolds each having a parish which contains an area of chalk hillside, fertile benches and marshy land on the Vale of Pickering. Fordon consists only of a few farms and a small church, some parts of which are of Norman construction. Wold Newton and Burton Fleming lie in the Great Wold Valley. A large round barrow called Willy Howe (Howe, a topographic name from Middle English, originated with the Old Norse word haugr meaning a small hill or a man-made mound or barrow.) lies between Wold Newton and Thwing. At Rudston Britain's tallest standing stone can be seen in the church yard. Boynton Hall was the home of William Strickland who is reputed to have brought the turkey to England. On the Wold top there are many traces of pre-historic peoples such as the barrows at Willerby Wold and Sharpe Howes above Folkton.

=== Driffield area ===
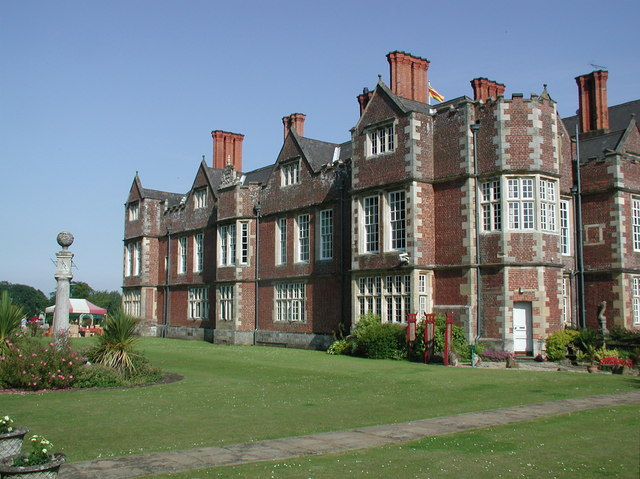
Burton Agnes Hall

On the seaward dip slope of the Wolds there is a series of villages extending from Bridlington to Driffield. These mark the spring line and the natural boundary between the chalk Wolds and the clay of Holderness. Driffield lies central to the crescentic shape of the Wolds area and since all of the Wolds are within easy reach it has become an important market town and is known as the Capital of the Wolds.

Villages of note include: Nafferton, which lies just off the A166 road and is the site of a mill pond fed by springs, Wansford to the south, lies on the Driffield canal and it has a church built by Sir Tatton Sykes in 1868. Close to Ruston Parva is Danes Graves, an archaeological site consisting of some 500 small round barrows marking Iron Age burials at least one of which yielded a corpse buried with a chariot and harness. Burton Agnes contains the ruins of a manor house dating from 1170 AD and a hall and gatehouse of the Elizabethan period. Kilham was a prosperous market town in the Medieval period but was replaced by Driffield in the 19th century as the Capital of the Wolds. In this area there is a long continuity of settlement with an Iron Age cemetery, the Roman road now known as Woldgate and an Anglian cemetery all in close proximity. Sledmere village has a uniformity of aspect which reveals its history as an 'estate' village. Close by is Sledmere House, the home of the Sykes family since the 18th century.

The southern area of the Yorkshire Wolds

=== Southern Wolds ===
In the south the Wolds are at their narrowest. Here they lie between the plain of Holderness to the east and the Vale of York to the west. The Humber Estuary cuts through the chalk formation leaving the Yorkshire Wolds to the north and the Lincolnshire Wolds to the south. In Roman times the estuary was crossed by a ford. The Humber Bridge now spans the estuary. This area has fine agricultural land and many villages, notable amongst which are: Walkington with its village pond and church of All Hallows: Bishop Burton which lies in a green hollow and has 19th century whitewashed cottages close to a village green with a large pond: Cherry Burton sits in a shallow valley in the shadow of the St Michael's and All Angels Church: Skidby which has an intact working windmill dating from 1821 which is now an agricultural museum. North Newbald is sited in a narrow valley on the western scarp of the Wolds and has a famous cruciform Norman church dedicated to St Nicholas. Beverley sits in the north-eastern corner of the Southern Wolds, with the common grazing lands of Swinemoor and the Figham Pastures being where the hills terminate, where extensive wetlands exist. The town is also home to the Beverley Minster which was founded, along with Beverley Grammar School, the oldest grammar school in the British Isles, by St John of Beverley in 700 AD. Beverley has been a sanctuary town since 978 AD, when King Athelstan visited the tomb of St John in St Mary's Church.

The village of Brantingham is home to Hull Ionians, a Rugby Union team who play in the Northern 1 league, the third tier of English Rugby Union. Beverley is home to both Beverley RUFC (who play in the Yorkshire Division One, the seventh tier of English Rugby Union) and Beverley Town Cricket Club (who play in the Yorkshire Premier League North Premier Division, the highest level of recreational cricket possible in England and Wales) .

=== Central Wolds ===
The western scarp of the Wolds reaches its highest point at Garrowby Hill. Wooded dales occur along the scarp with small becks flowing down to the Vale of York below. The market towns of Pocklington and Market Weighton are sited between the wolds and the vale. Large parks and houses lie along the scarp from Garrowby Hall to Kilnwick Percy, Warter Priory and Londesborough Hall. Millington is situated within Millington Dale and the road leading along the brow of the dale is particularly scenic. The village of Kiplingcotes is the location for the annual Kiplingcotes Derby horse race, said to be the oldest horse race in England. The 499th event took place on 15 March 2018 but was reduced to a horse being led round the course.

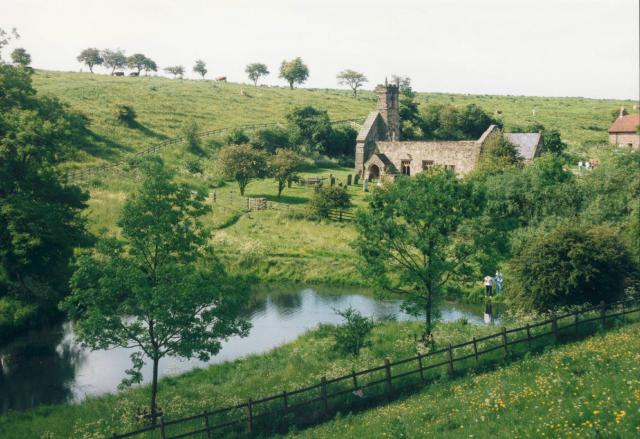
Wharram Percy deserted medieval village

=== Western Wolds ===
From Garrowby Hill northwards to Ganton the high scarp of the Wolds swings in a crescent to overlook the Vales of York and Pickering. Villages tend to be clustered along the scarp foot or in the upper part of the Great Wold Valley. Rillington is a village with a stream passing through and a nearby park at Scampston. Between the villages of West Knapton and East Knapton there is a hall and park, while south-east of the villages in Knapton Wood is Staple Howe, an Iron Age site. The twin villages of East and West Heslerton lie further along the A64 road. West Heslerton is a well known archaeological site, with artefacts from several eras having been recovered. Wharram Percy is one of the most notable deserted village sites in the UK.

== History and archaeology ==
The Wolds area is rich in archaeological remains. There is a profusion of Neolithic, Bronze Age and Romano-British sites extending across the entire Yorkshire Wolds area. The availability of fertile chalk soils, good grazing and the light tree cover along with stone suitable for making tools made this area attractive to early Neolithic settlers. Along with Wessex and Orkney, the Yorkshire Wolds is a key area for studying the development of the Neolithic period in the British Isles as it became a major focus for settlement in this era. Isolated farms rather than settlements of any size appear to have been the normal dwelling types however few have been located with any certainty and most evidence is of funerary sites and ritual monuments. Recently excavated long barrows at Fordon on Willerby Wold and at Kilham have been carbon dated to around 3700 BC. A well-known round barrow of this period is the monumental Duggleby Howe, at the western end of the Great Wolds Valley, partially excavated in 1890 by J.R. Mortimer. A henge monument of the Neolithic has been identified at Maidens Grave Rudston and the Rudston Monolith has also been assigned to this period. An extensive Neolithic ritual complex, the main elements of which are four large cursus monuments and a henge, is situated near the eastern end of the Great Wold Valley.

More than 1,400 Bronze Age round barrows, comprising one or more burials and accompanied by items of grave goods, are known to exist on the Yorkshire Wolds. They occur either in isolation or, more commonly, grouped together to form cemeteries. Many of these sites, although they have been reduced in size by repeated ploughing, still form upstanding and, in some cases, prominent features in the present-day landscape.

The Romans arrived in this area around 71 AD. From a base at Brough on the north bank of the Humber they established a road network with one branch towards York and another to Malton, both crossing the Wolds area. The settlements of the native Parisi were little disturbed by the Roman occupiers at first, but in later years they became Romanised, adopting the Roman material culture. There are villa sites on the Wolds at Rudston, Harpham, Brantingham, Welton and Wharram-le-Street.

Walkington Wold, near the village of Walkington in the southern area of the Wolds, is the site of an Anglo-Saxon execution cemetery, the only known example from northern England.

In 2014, two horse skeletons and the remains of a chariot dating back to the Iron Age were unearthed on a Pocklington building site.

== Culture and media ==
The writer Winifred Holtby who was born at Rudston lived in the area and described the Wolds as "fold upon fold of the encircling hills, piled rich and golden."

The Yorkshire Wolds Versatile Brass performs in local venues in the Yorkshire Wolds region.

David Hockney has featured the Yorkshire Wolds in many of his paintings that were shown at the Royal Academy in the exhibition 'A Bigger Picture' in the spring of 2012.

Yorkshire Wolds Way, a two-part BBC television documentary, first broadcast in January 2017, features a journey along the Yorkshire Wolds Way.

== Wolds Way ==
One of nine National Trails in England, the Yorkshire Wolds Way is a long-distance footpath which runs the length of the wolds from the Humber Bridge at Hessle to Filey on the coast. It is managed by Natural England.

== See also ==
- The Weald
- Yorkshire Dales
