= Thixendale =

Village and civil parish in North Yorkshire, England

Coordinates: 54°02′20″N 0°42′53″W

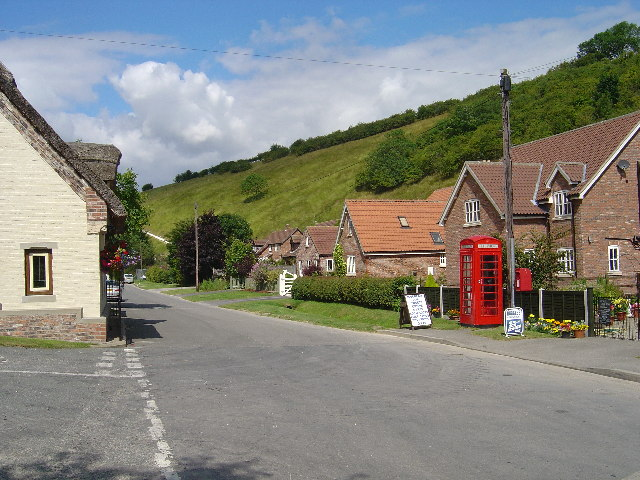
- Thixendale

- Location within North Yorkshire
- Population: 200 (2016 estimate)
- OS grid reference: SE840611
- Unitary authority: North Yorkshire
- Ceremonial county: North Yorkshire
- Region: Yorkshire and the Humber
- Country: England
- Sovereign state: United Kingdom
- Post town: MALTON
- Postcode district: YO17
- Dialling code: 01377
- Police: North Yorkshire
- Fire: North Yorkshire
- Ambulance: Yorkshire
- UK Parliament: Thirsk and Malton

Thixendale is a village and civil parish in North Yorkshire, England. It is located in the Yorkshire Wolds about 20 miles east of York. In 2016, the North Yorkshire County Council estimated the population of the parish to be 200.

The place name Thixendale is first attested in the Domesday Book of 1086, where it appears as Sixtendale and Xistendale. The name means 'Sigstein's Dale or Valley'. The name Sigstein is also the source for the name of Sysonby in Leicestershire.

Thixendale was historically a township in the ancient parish of Wharram Percy in the East Riding of Yorkshire. It became a separate civil parish in 1866, and in 1872 was separated to form a new ecclesiastical parish with Raisthorpe and Burdale. In 1974 The civil parish was transferred to the new county of North Yorkshire. From 1974 to 2023 it was part of the district of Ryedale. It is now administered by the unitary North Yorkshire Council.

The only pub, the Cross Keys, is a regular winner of local CAMRA awards.

The Yorkshire Wolds Way National Trail passes through the village. Two other long distance footpaths, the Centenary Way and the Chalkland Way, also pass through the village.

St Mary's Church, Thixendale is one of a group of village buildings according to designs by George Edmund Street in 1868–1870. It was designated in 1966 by English Heritage as a Grade II* listed building. It is on the Sykes Churches Trail devised by the East Yorkshire Historic Churches Group.

For many years until the late 1990s, television signals were blocked by the surrounding hills until a small transmitter was built, providing the village with terrestrial television for the first time. The transmitter ceased operation in the early 2000s, with villagers now relying on satellite TV and, since 2017, fast broadband.

== See also ==
- Listed buildings in Thixendale
