= Willy Howe =

Barrow in the East Riding of Yorkshire, England

Coordinates: 54.136067°N 0.376626°W

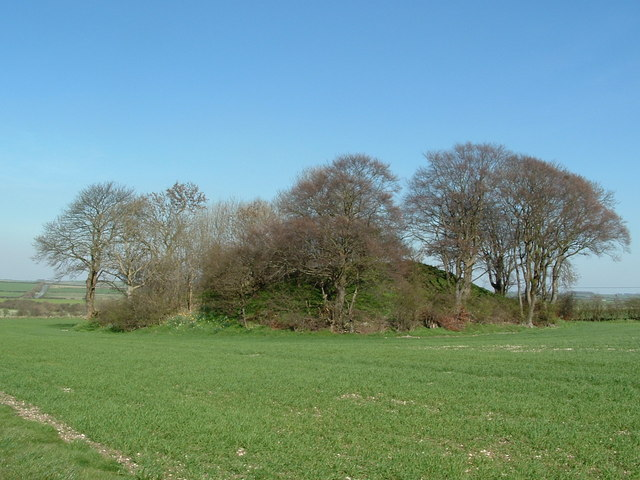
Willy Howe (2007)

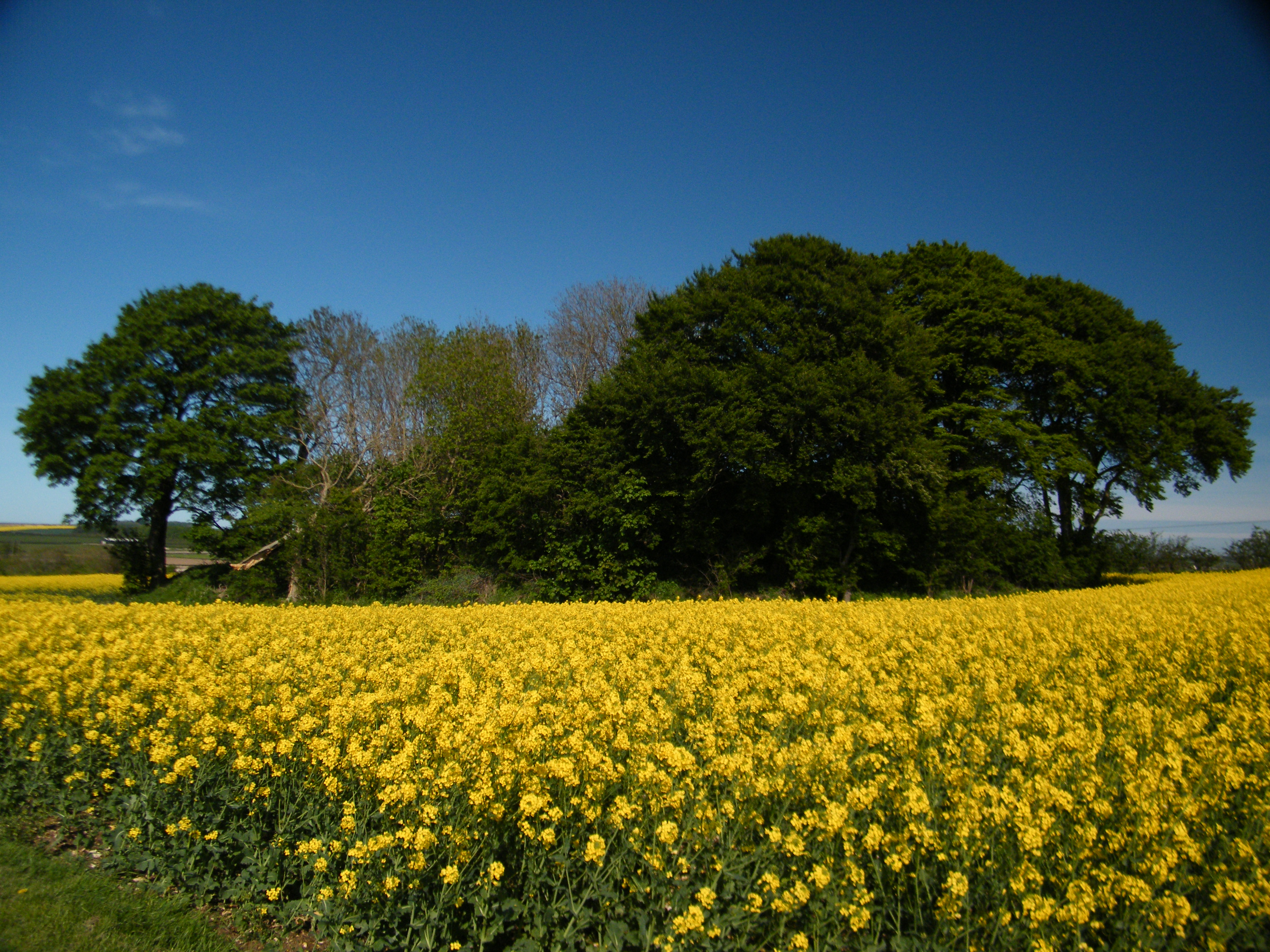
Willy Howe Barrow

Willy Howe (also Willey-Hou) is a tumulus in the Yorkshire Wolds, East Riding of Yorkshire, England.

== History and description ==
Willy Howe is a large round barrow 7.5 m (25 ft) high, located between Wold Newton and Burton Fleming in the civil parish of Thwing. The mound has been recorded as being excavated several times: by Lord Londesborough in 1857; and by Canon William Greenwell in 1887. Neither found burials or grave goods; Greenwell found a feature approximating a shallow grave.

The structure has a central space, resulting from the 19th-century excavations, additionally an earthwork ramp created as part of Greenwell's excavations has also modified the site. Use as a Thingstead during the medieval period has been speculated.

Willy Howe is registered on the National Heritage List for England as a Scheduled Monument. Its List Entry Number is 1008040.

=== Folklore ===
Thomas Wright ascribed the barrow to be the location of a folktale recorded by William of Newburgh in the 12th century: the legend tells of a man returning home past the barrow at night being surprised to hear sounds of feasting, merriment and singing emanating from the mound. On approaching the mound he was offered a cup of drink from fairy-folk there but being wary of the nature of the drink offered he emptied the cup and rode off on his horse with the cup, pursued by the dwellers of the mound. According to the story the vessel was of unusual form and colour and eventually passed into the hands of Henry I and later other kings. (Note: The tale is similar to others, including The Altar-Cup in Aagerup, a Fairy cup legend.) At least two other fairy tales have been ascribed to the mound, one of an immovable chest of treasure, the other of a fairy bride depositing gold for her human lover.
