= Duggleby Howe =

Large round barrow in England

Coordinates: 54.090400°N 0.655500°W

Duggleby Howe from the air

Duggleby Howe (also known as Howe Hill, Duggleby) is one of the largest round barrows in Britain, located on the southern side of the Great Wold Valley in the county of North Yorkshire (historically the East Riding of Yorkshire), and is one of four such monuments in this area, known collectively as the Great barrows of East Yorkshire. Duggleby Howe is believed on the basis of artefacts recovered to be of Late Neolithic date, but no radiocarbon dates are available. Howe as a place name is believed to have originated from the Old Norse word haugr.

The monument consists of a mound, the base of which was 120 feet (37 m) in diameter. The top of the barrow was apparently truncated at some point in the past, leaving an almost-level platform some 47 feet (14 m) in diameter. On this was constructed a post mill of medieval type. The mound was 22 feet (6.7 m) high at the eastern end and 18 or 19 feet (5.5 or 5.8 m) high at the western end.

The barrow lies within a roughly circular enclosure, approximately 370 metres in diameter, formed from interrupted ditches, and open to the south. To the east of the barrow, one within the enclosure and one outside, are two ring ditches, believed to be of Bronze Age date. Although the barrow itself was long known, it was not until 1979 that the existence of the enclosure was confirmed using aerial photographs taken by D. N. Riley.

The barrow was first excavated in either 1798 or 1799 by the Reverend Christopher Sykes, but no records of his excavation remain. Beginning on 21 July 1890 J. R. Mortimer, under the sponsorship of Sir Tatton Sykes, excavated "an area of 40 feet square over the centre of the barrow, and a portion of the east side" over a period of more than six weeks. This excavation was re-assessed by Ian Kinnes, Timothy Schadla-Hall, Paul Chadwick and Philip Dean in 1983 to produce the interpretation presented below.

== Phases ==
=== Phase I ===
In the first phase of activity at Duggleby Howe a shaft grave was excavated and at the base of it was interred an adult male in a crouched position accompanied by a Towthorpe bowl, flint cores and flint flakes.

Higher up in the fill of the shaft grave were interred an adult and an infant, both in a crouched position. At the feet of the adult was placed another adult's skull. The latter skull is referred to as 'cranium J' and evidence of blunt force trauma as a cause of death on both sides of the skull has led to the suggestion that it represents a very rare case of human sacrifice for British Neolithic funerary monuments.

=== Phase II ===
Once the shaft grave had been back-filled, the bodies of two adults, accompanied by flint and antler tools, were laid in the hollow created by the settling of the fill of the shaft grave.

=== Phase III ===
To the east of the shaft grave was then cut a shallow grave in which was deposited another adult in a crouched position, accompanied by flint arrowheads, flint flakes, a bone pin, and various implements formed from boar tusk and beaver tooth.

The primary round barrow, composed of "clayey or earthy matter", was erected next. In it were included the remains of four infants, three children, an adolescent, and an adult. The mound was completed with a layer of "small chalk grit" and a thinner layer of "Blue Kimmeridge clay".

=== Phase IV ===
Subsequent to the construction of the primary mound, 53 cremations were inserted into the crest of it. None of the cremated remains were enclosed in vessels, but instead occurred in heaps 6–18 inches (15–46 centimetres) in diameter and 1–6 inches (2.5–15.2 centimetres) high. Because not all of the barrow was excavated, Mortimer considered it possible that there were equally as many cremations preserved in the untouched part of the mound. The cremations were unaccompanied by artefacts except for three fragments of burnt bone pin.

=== Phase V ===
The barrow was subsequently enlarged by the addition of "roughly quarried chalk" to create the massive final mound.

Later the mound was used as the emplacement for a post-mill.

Kinnes and his colleagues see Duggleby Howe as a cemetery used over a long period of time, representing a stratified funerary sequence for the Late Neolithic. Roy Loveday has suggested, as did J. R. Mortimer, that in fact the many burials may represent instead a sacrifice to mark the death of a powerful figure, perhaps the individual found at the base of the original shaft grave.

Mortimer's excavation technique, although good for the time, did not record the archaeological stratigraphy sufficiently well to allow this question to be settled.

== The Great Barrows of East Yorkshire ==
- South Side Mount
- Willy Howe
- Wold Newton Barrow 284
