= St Mary's Church, West Lutton =

Church in West Lutton, North Yorkshire, England

Coordinates: 54°06′38″N 0°34′41″W

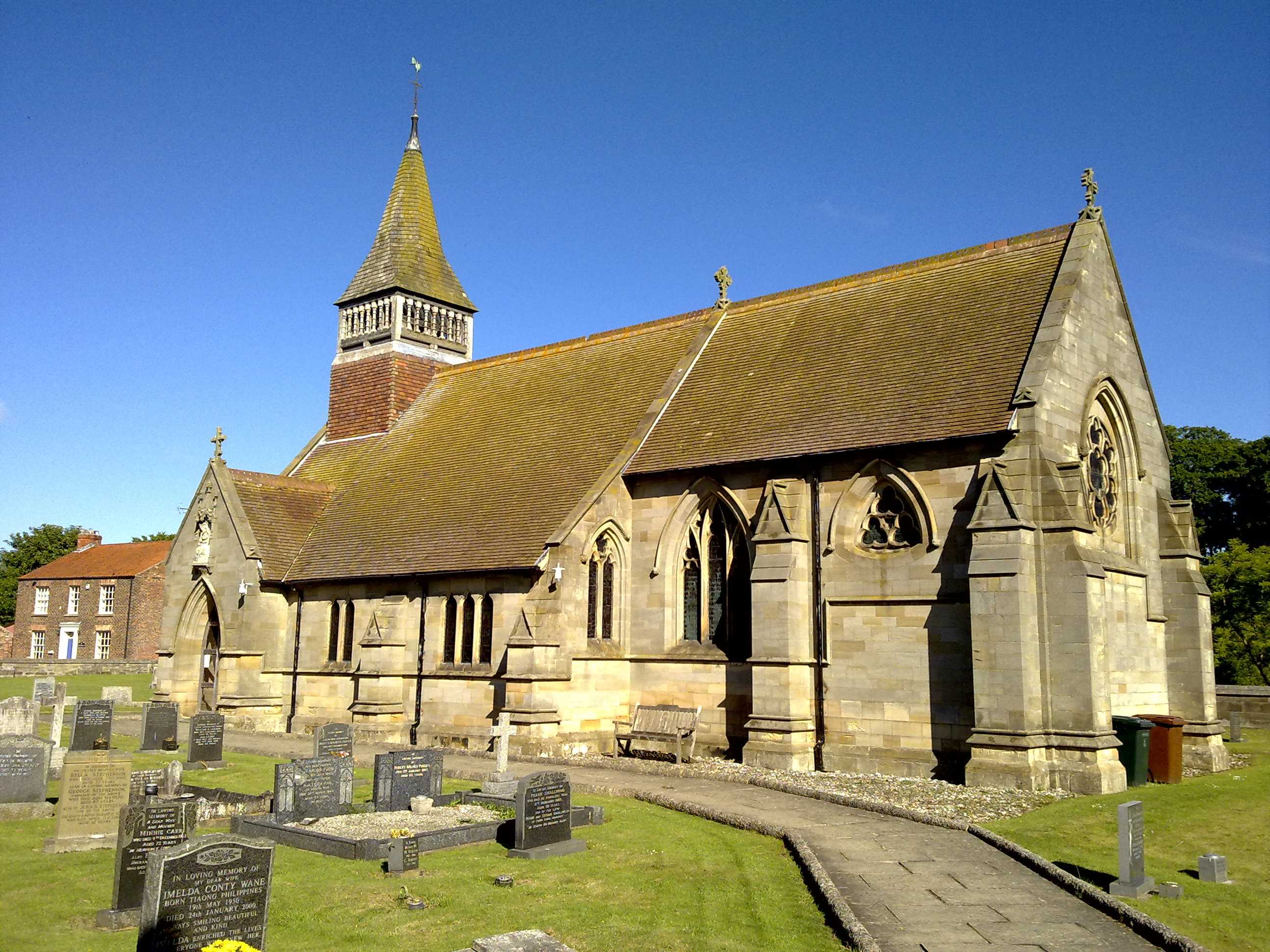
The church, in 2009

St Mary's Church is the parish church of West Lutton, a village in North Yorkshire, in England.

A chapel of ease was built on the site, probably in the early 12th century. It was demolished and a new church constructed from 1874 to 1875. The construction was funded by Sir Tatton Sykes, 5th Baronet, and designed by George Edmund Street. Street also designed a vicarage, coach house and associated buildings. The building was grade II* listed in 1966.

The church is built of sandstone on a chamfered plinth, with a tile roof. It consists of a nave, north and south aisles, a south porch, and a chancel and vestry. On the west gable is a tile-hung belfry with timber balustraded bell openings, and a broach spire with a weathercock. The porch is gabled and has a pointed arch with three orders. Above it is a bracketed niche containing a statue, and a crocketed canopy. Above the outside door to the vestry is a Romanesque arch, relocated from the old chapel.

Inside, the sedilia, piscina and aumbry are grouped under pointed arches. There is a painted timber altar, and a reredos in the form of a triptych, depicting the Crucifixion of Jesus, which was designed by Burlison and Grylls. The same firm designed the stained glass, with the west window depicting the Tree of Jesse being most noted. There is a stone pulpit, an octagonal stone baptismal font, and an iron and brass chancel screen.

== See also ==
- Grade II* listed churches in North Yorkshire (district)
- Listed buildings in Luttons
