= St Mary's Church, Fimber =

Church in Fimber, East Riding of Yorkshire, England

Coordinates: 54°02′02″N 0°38′10″W

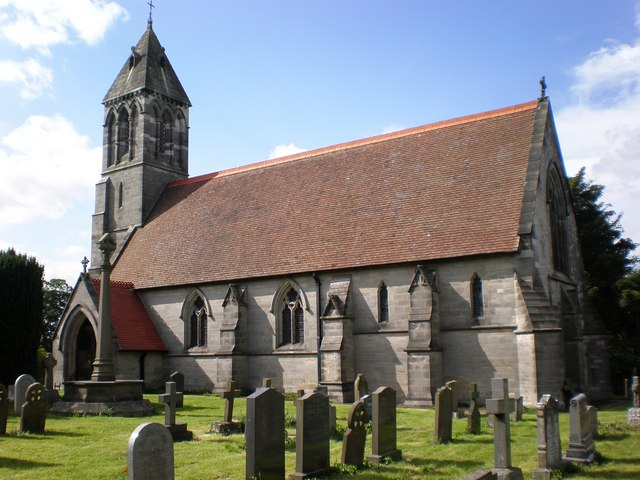
The church, in 2009

St Mary's Church is the parish church of Fimber, a village in the East Riding of Yorkshire, in England.

Fimber was long in the parish of St Nicholas' Church, Wetwang. A chapel of ease was constructed in the mediaeval period. In 1848, it was described as "a small ancient edifice", and in 1851 it was recorded as having seating for 100 worshippers, with a typical weekly attendance of 30. In 1871, the church was demolished, and a replacement funded by Tatton Sykes. It was designed by George Edmund Street in the Gothic revival style. The building was grade II listed in 1966.

The church is built of stone, and has a tiled roof, with the roof having a roof of stone slates. It consists of a three-bay nave with south porch, two-bay chancel, vestry and four-stage west tower. The tower has a pyramidal roof with lucarnes each side, surmounted with crosses. There are a variety of windows, and the chancel has an octagonal chimney. The interior is plain, with a double sedilia, double piscina, painted roof, octagonal font, and stained glass by Clayton and Bell.
