= Luton v Lessels =

Judgement of the High Court of Australia

- Court: High Court of Australia
- Full case name: Luton v Lessels & Anor
- Decided: 11 April 2002
- Citation: (2002) 210 CLR 333

Case history
- Prior action: none
- Subsequent action: none

Court membership
- Judges sitting: Gleeson CJ, Gaudron, McHugh, Kirby, Hayne and Callinan JJ

Case opinions
- (6:0) The scheme established by the Child Support (Registration and Collection) Act 1988 and the Child Support (Assessment) Act 1989 (Cth) for the collection and payment of money otherwise payable to or receivable by the recipient is not a tax (per Gleeson CJ, Gaudron, McHugh, Kirby, Hayne and Callinan JJ) (6:0) The Acts do not confer on the Child Support Agency judicial power and are not offensive to the doctrine of separation of powers (per Gleeson CJ, Gaudron, McHugh, Kirby, Hayne and Callinan JJ)

Luton v Lessels (2002) 210 CLR 333 is a High Court of Australia case that affirms previous High Court definitions of a tax.

== Facts ==
The Commonwealth established a Child Support scheme where a non-custodial parent was required to pay an amount of their income to the custodial parent to assist in the costs of raising their children. This scheme was established by the Child Support (Registration and Collection) Act 1988 and the Child Support (Assessment) Act 1989.

Luton, a non-custodial parent challenged the scheme on the grounds that the payment was a form of tax because it was collected by the government, and section 55 of the constitution mandates that tax legislation must deal with matters of taxation only.

Luton also claimed the Child Support Scheme conferred judicial powers on non-judicial officers. Thus, the legislation was contrary to Chapter III of the Constitution because it offended the doctrine of separation of powers.

== Decision ==
The High Court unanimously held that the payment of child support was not a tax. Although the government collected the money, it was merely facilitating a necessary transfer of money between private citizens. It provided a mechanism for this exchange of an existing private obligation.

== See also ==
- Constitutional basis of taxation in Australia
- Australian constitutional law
