= Burton Fleming =

Village and civil parish in the East Riding of Yorkshire, England

Coordinates: 54°08′02″N 0°20′37″W

- Village and civil parish
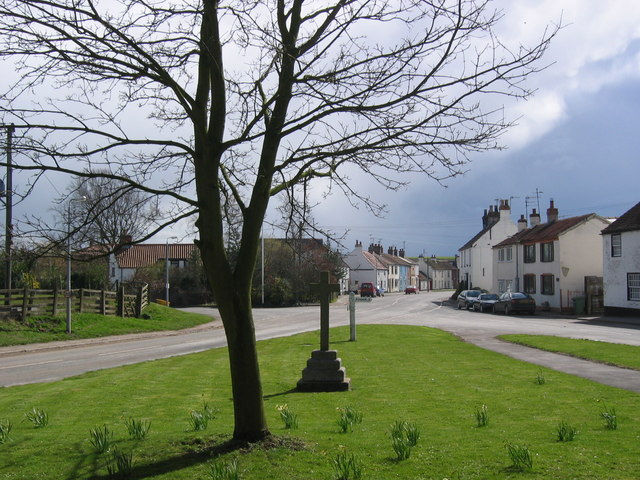
- Burton Fleming, looking south from the Church gate

- Location within the East Riding of Yorkshire
- Population: 430 (2011 census)
- OS grid reference: TA083722
  - London: 160 mi (260 km) S
- Civil parish: Burton Fleming
- Unitary authority: East Riding of Yorkshire
- Ceremonial county: East Riding of Yorkshire
- Region: Yorkshire and the Humber
- Country: England
- Sovereign state: United Kingdom
- Post town: DRIFFIELD
- Postcode district: YO25
- Dialling code: 01262
- Police: Humberside
- Fire: Humberside
- Ambulance: Yorkshire
- UK Parliament: Bridlington and The Wolds

Burton Fleming is a village and civil parish in the East Riding of Yorkshire, England. It lies close to the border with North Yorkshire. The village is situated approximately 7 miles (11 km) north-west of Bridlington and 6 miles (10 km) south of Filey.

== History ==
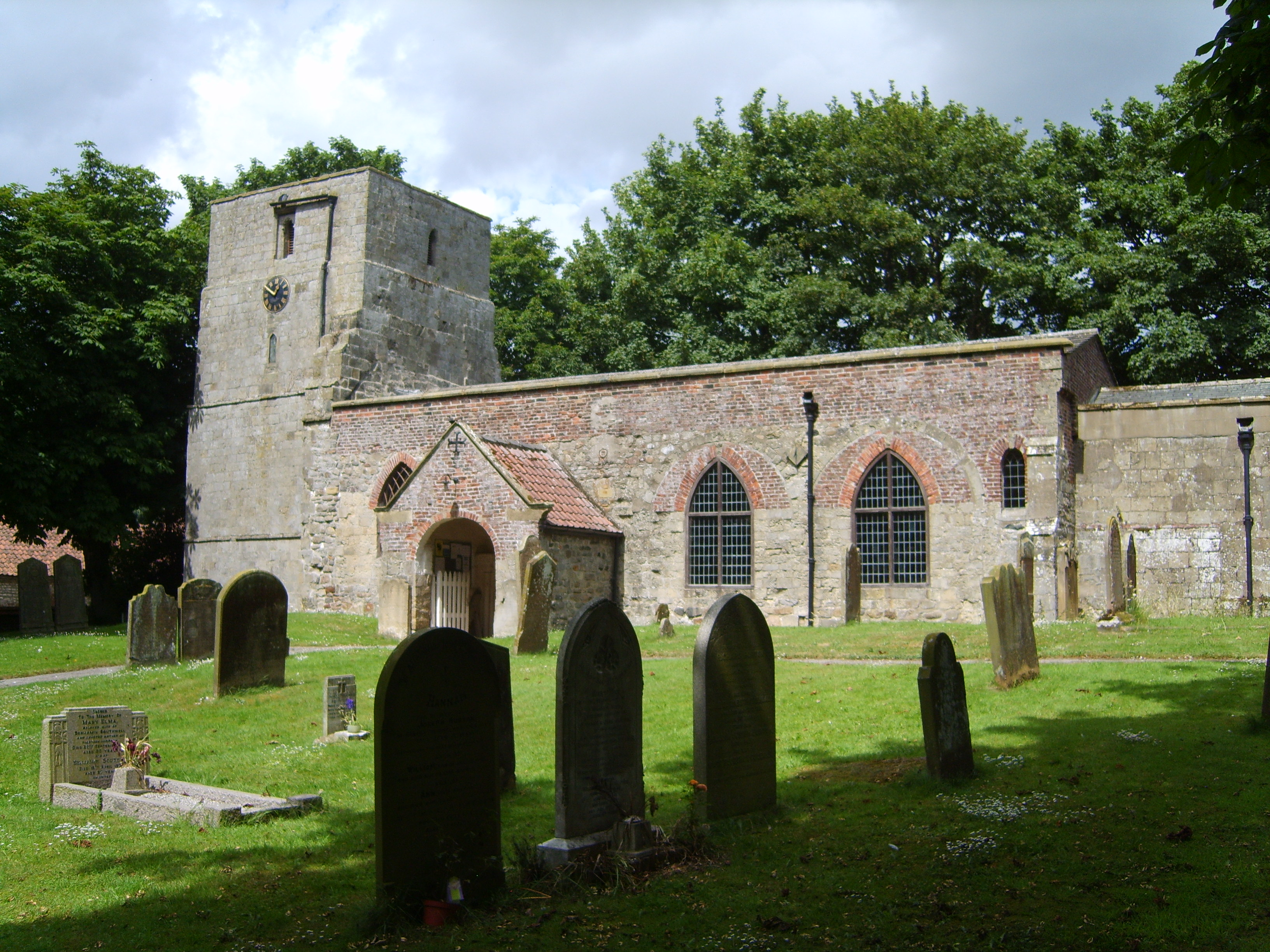
St Cuthbert's church

The name Burton derives from the Old English burhtūn meaning 'settlement at the fort'. 'Fleming' derives from the Fleming family who held the village in the 12th century.

Burton Fleming was earlier known as North Burton.

According to the 2011 UK census, Burton Fleming parish had a population of 430, an increase on the 2001 UK census figure of 363.

From the Medieval era until the 19th century Burton Fleming was part of Dickering Wapentake. Between 1894 and 1974 Burton Fleming was a part of the Bridlington Rural District, in the East Riding of Yorkshire. Between 1974 and 1996 it was part of the Borough of North Wolds (later Borough of East Yorkshire), in the county of Humberside.

The village is noted for the house where Queen Henrietta Maria was sent into hiding during the English Civil War. A significant British Iron Age cemetery—Burton Fleming archaeological site—consisting of 64 barrows forming part of the Arras Culture of the East Riding of Yorkshire was excavated here in the 1970s.

St Cuthbert's Church, Burton Fleming is the village's Grade II* listed Anglican church. Dating from the 12th century, it previously had a Norman aisle to its nave; the aisle arcades are now evident as part of the exterior wall. The church retains a Norman south doorway and west tower.

== Amenities ==
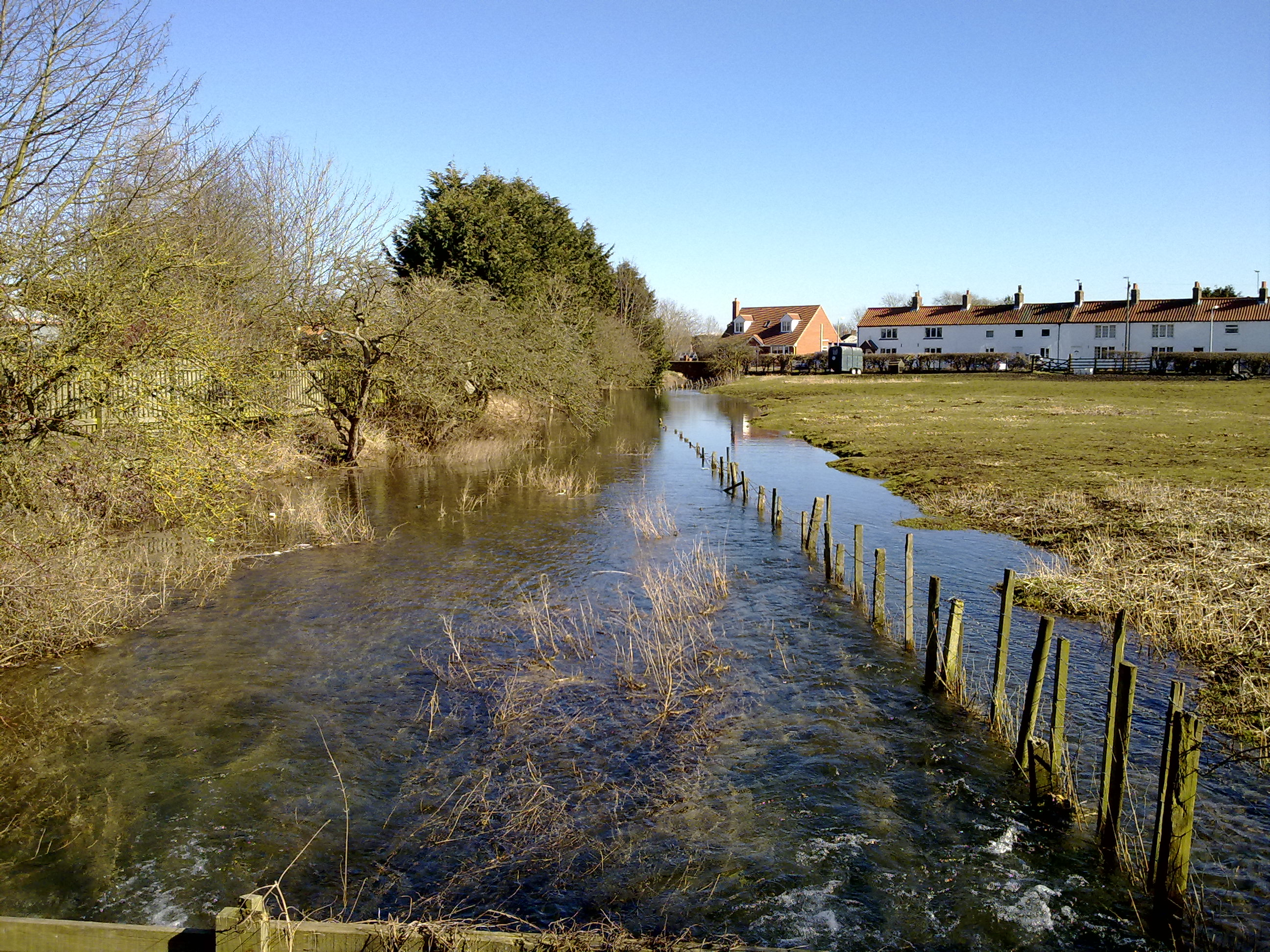
Gypsey Race in full flow

The Gypsey Race flows through the village and through other neighbouring villages such as Wold Newton. In 2012 the village suffered serious flooding from the Gypsey Race.

Burton Fleming has a public house, the Burton Arms, and a butcher's shop.

In March 2017, the village declared itself "hedgehog friendly".

== See also ==
- Listed buildings in Burton Fleming
