= Great Wold Valley =

Valley in northern England

Coordinates: 54.1385°N 0.3835°W

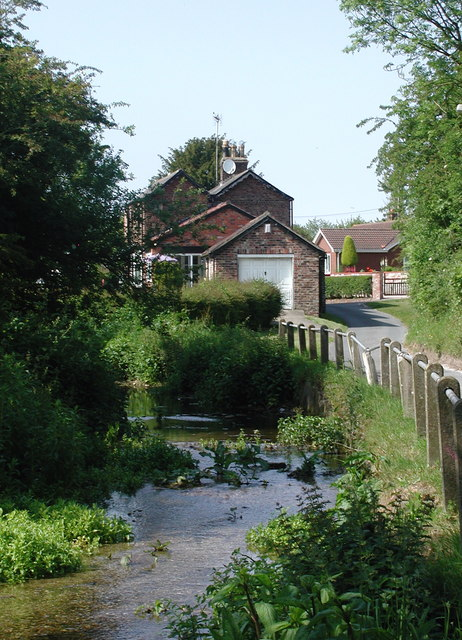
The Gypsey Race near the corner of Middle Street and Marton Lane, Rudston.

The Great Wold Valley is the largest and broadest of the valleys cutting into the Yorkshire Wolds in northern England. It carries the Gypsey Race, an intermittent stream, which runs from its source near Wharram-le-Street eastwards along and through the northern Yorkshire Wolds to reach the sea at Bridlington.

It is known that the Great Wold Valley was an important place of worship during Neolithic times and there are a number of scheduled monuments in the valley. There are two dramatic right angle bends in the course of the Gypsey Race, one turning to the south at Burton Fleming then another turning eastwards again at Rudston. This intermittent and irregular watercourse is believed to be affected by a siphoning action in underground reservoirs and can come into flood apparently regardless of recent rainfall in the local vicinity. This seemingly 'magical' property is thought to be responsible for the number of significant Neolithic sites along its course, including the Rudston Monolith and the ancient burial mounds at Willy Howe, Duggleby Howe and Wold Newton. Howe, in this case a topographic name from Middle English, originated with the Old Norse word haugr meaning a small hill or a man-made mound or barrow.

== Physical influences ==
The underlying bedrock of the valley is chalk which was laid down in the Cretaceous period. On the sides of the valley wind blown sand and loess overlie the chalk and in the valley bottom alluvium covers undifferentiated deposits of fragmented chalk which were eroded from the hillsides in the Ice Age. In pre-glacial times the Great Wold Valley was the seaward outlet of the River Ure from Wensleydale but the ice sheets in the Vale of York blocked and then permanently altered the course of the Ure.

== Human influences ==
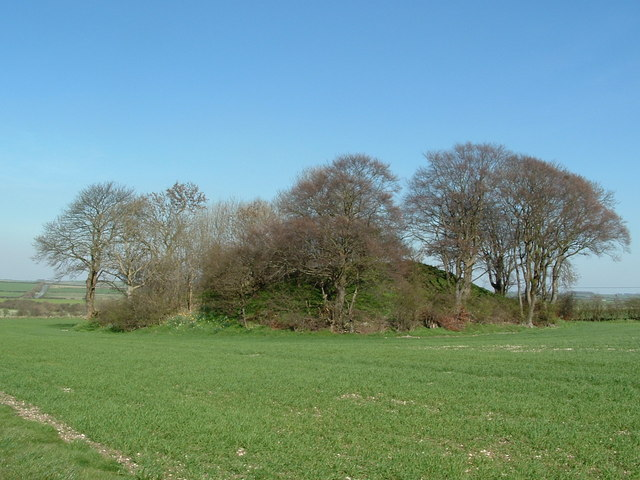
Willy Howe burial chamber

The historic landscape of the Great Wold Valley provides an important insight into the activities of prehistoric peoples in the Wolds. The valley was an important place of worship in prehistoric times and the valley houses a number of important scheduled monuments dating back to Neolithic times. Rudston is the centre of a prehistoric landscape and four Neolithic cursus converge on the village area. Argham Dyke, a prehistoric earthwork dating from the Bronze Age, crosses the area near Rudston. There is also evidence of Iron Age and Romano British occupation as revealed by aerial photographs showing traces of fields, trackways and farms. A Roman villa has been excavated to the south-west of Rudston.

The present day field pattern is the result of parliamentary enclosure in the 18th and 19th centuries when large areas of common land were enclosed and a new system of land management was introduced. Farmers moved out of the villages onto scattered farmsteads linked to units of land. Nucleated farmsteads usually built of brick with slate or pan tiled roofs were constructed often located on high ground in the rolling farmland. These exposed locations were protected by the planting of shelterbelts of trees. Recreation and tourism enterprises including camping and caravan sites, hotels and fishing lakes, are to be found in the area of the valley close to Bridlington.

== Ecological influences ==
Watercourses that are intermittent and irregular are locally referred to as 'gypsey springs'. They are found all over the Yorkshire Wolds. The Gypsey Race which passes through the Great Wold Valley is the best known of these watercourses. It is a chalk stream which supports large stands of bur-reed. West of Boynton, Boynton Willow Garth SSSI is an example of fen carr with a mosaic of habitats consisting of fen, scrub, woodland and running water. In the more open areas of the lower valley vegetation includes meadowsweet and great willowherb. Under the woodland canopies wood avens and enchanters nightshade are present.

In the upper part of the valley the Gypsey Race begins at Duggleby Howe. This stretch of the valley is broad and flat bottomed with the valley bottom being around 50m above ordnance datum and the sides rising to 150m above ordnance datum. In places the stream disappears and land use is mainly arable farming with some areas of grassland. Hedgerows form field boundaries and provide wildlife corridors.
