= Wharram =

Civil parish in North Yorkshire, England

Coordinates: 54°4′N 0°41′W

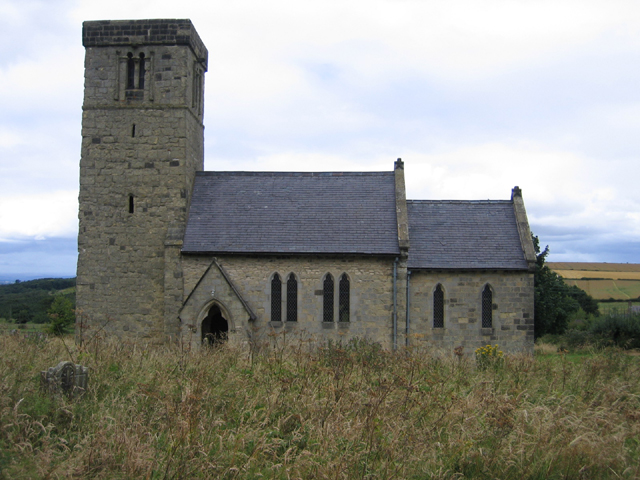
- Church of St Mary, Wharram le Street

- Location within North Yorkshire
- Population: 120 (2016 estimate)
- Civil parish: Wharram
- Unitary authority: North Yorkshire
- Ceremonial county: North Yorkshire
- Region: Yorkshire and the Humber
- Country: England
- Sovereign state: United Kingdom
- Police: North Yorkshire
- Fire: North Yorkshire
- Ambulance: Yorkshire

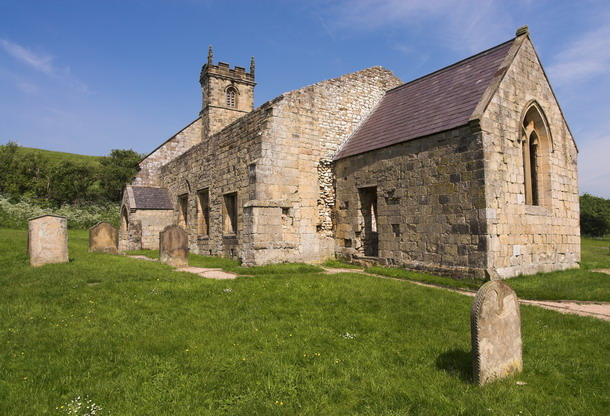
Wharram Percy

Wharram is a civil parish in North Yorkshire, England. It lies on the Yorkshire Wolds, 6 miles (10 km) south-east of Malton. The principal settlement is the village of Wharram-le-Street, and the parish also includes the deserted medieval village of Wharram Percy and the deserted medieval villages (now hamlets) of Raisthorpe and Burdale, some 3 miles (5 km) south of Wharram-le-Street. The population of the parish was estimated at 120 in 2016.

The parish consists of high Wolds, rising to 741 feet (226 m) above sea level, into which are cut a number of dry valleys. In the north-east of the parish is the head of the Great Wold Valley. A deep valley, known variously as Water Dale and Burdale, runs across the south of the parish from Fimber in the east to Thixendale in the west, and a series of shorter valleys (Court Dale, William Dale, Fairy Dale, Middle Dale and Whay Dale) cut into the northern side of this valley. In the west of the parish, Drue Dale joins Deep Dale to form a broader valley in which Wharram Percy lies. In the 19th century the Malton and Driffield Junction Railway was built though these valleys from north to south, connected by the Burdale Tunnel. The wolds and valleys of the parish are now linked by three long-distance footpaths, the Yorkshire Wolds Way, the Chalkland Way and the Centenary Way.

The parish was created in 1935, when the civil parishes of Wharram-le-Street (population 133), Wharram Percy (population 40) and Raisthorpe and Burdale (population 89) were abolished. At that time the parish was part of Norton Rural District in the East Riding of Yorkshire. In 1974 it was transferred to the new county of North Yorkshire. From 1974 to 2023 it was part of the district of Ryedale, it is now administered by the unitary North Yorkshire Council.

== See also ==
- Listed buildings in Wharram
