= Yorkshire Wolds Railway =

Railway line in the East Riding of Yorkshire, England

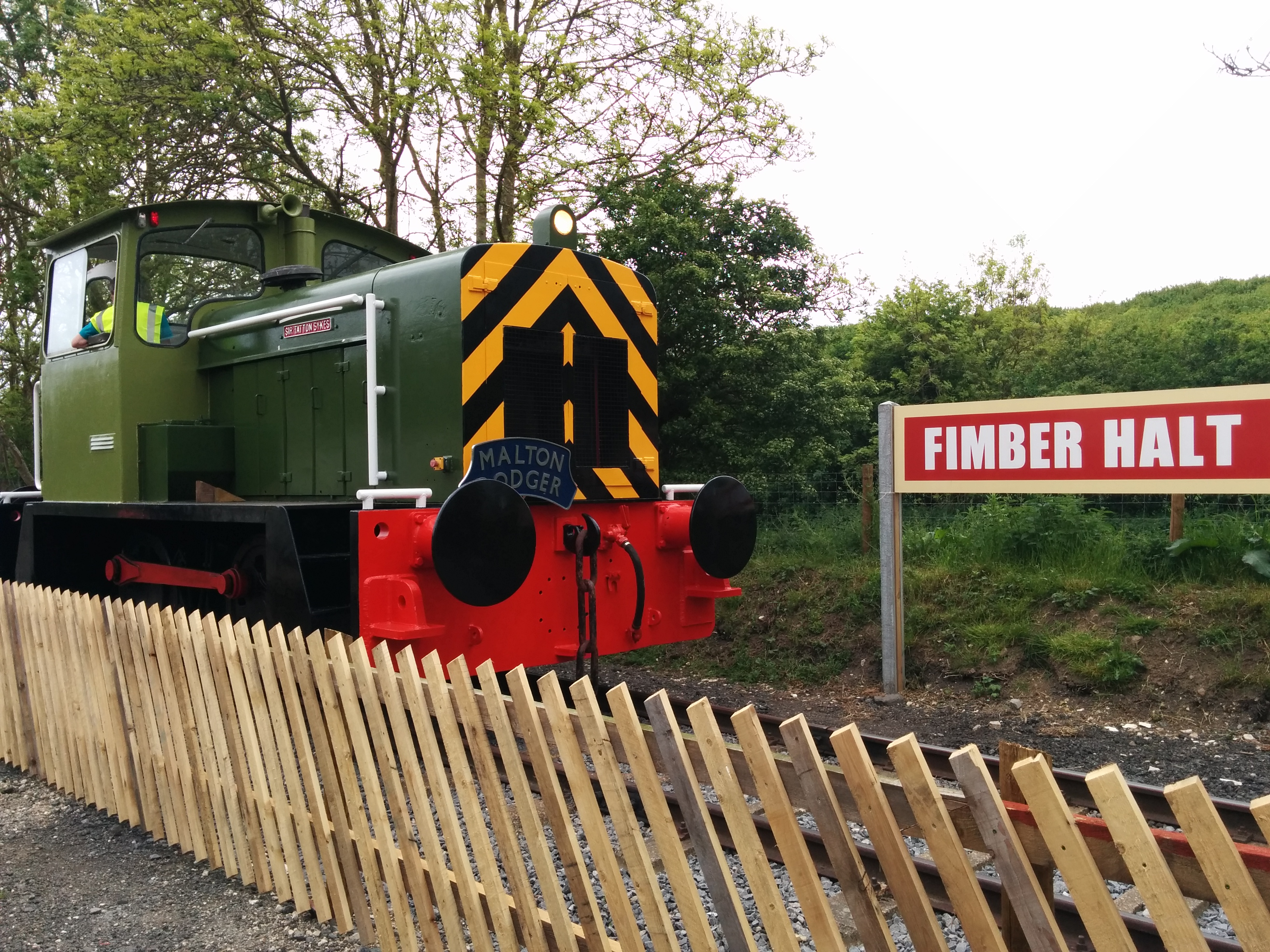
- Sir Tatton Skyes on the running line at Fimber Halt in May 2015
- Locale: East Riding of Yorkshire, England
- Terminus: Fimber Halt (SE91146077)
- Coordinates: 54.0350°N 0.6100°W

Commercial operations
- Name: Yorkshire Wolds Railway
- Built by: Malton and Driffield Junction Company
- Original gauge: 4 ft 8 1/2 in (1,435 mm) standard gauge

Preserved operations
- Operated by: Malton Dodger Ltd
- Stations: One, at Fimber Halt
- Length: nearly 1,000 feet (300 m)
- Preserved gauge: 4 ft 8 1/2 in (1,435 mm) standard gauge

Commercial history
- Opened: 19 May 1853
- Closed: 20 October 1958

Preservation history
- October 2008: Project established
- 2012: Start on site
- 24 May 2015: Opens to the public
- Headquarters: Fimber Halt

Website
- www.yorkshirewoldsrailway.org.uk

The Yorkshire Wolds Railway is a preserved railway in the East Riding of Yorkshire, England. It is located on a section of the Malton and Driffield Junction Railway near the village of Fimber. The railway has a short demonstration line and an operational industrial diesel locomotive that provides cab rides to visitors. The railway has plans for expansion, work on which has been underway since April 2019.

== History ==
The line was built as part of a scheme supported by George Hudson to create a line of communication from Hull to Newcastle. The line opened on 19 May 1853; its traffic was almost exclusively local passenger trains and freight traffic from the quarries at Burdale and Wharram, with the occasional summer Sunday services to the coast. The quarries, however, suffered a boom and bust existence and their business dried up by the 1950s leading to the line's final closure on 20 October 1958.

== Heritage operation ==
In October 2008 the Yorkshire Wolds Railway Restoration Project was formed with the aim to restore at least part of the Malton and Driffield railway line as a heritage attraction.

In 2012 the group gained planning permission to build a visitors centre near to the site of the former Fimber and Sledmere station. The land required for all of the current project is owned by the Sledmere Estate who are supportive of the railway. As a tourist attraction, the railway is intended to be an interesting stop-off on the route to the Yorkshire coast, becoming part of a range of tourist attractions in the Yorkshire Wolds including Sledmere House and Wharram Percy deserted medieval village.

In September 2012 the project acquired its first vehicle, an ex-BR Mark 1 full brake coach (or 'BG'). In 2013 the charity obtained its first locomotive, a GEC diesel shunter GEC Traction 5576 built in 1979 at the English Electric Vulcan foundry works. It was originally operated by British Steel Corporation at Shotton, and later by Trackwork Ltd of Doncaster as a training vehicle in the rail engineering unit at HM Prison Lindholme. The locomotive was repainted in BR green, a two-tone livery similar to that seen on BR Class 14 shunters, and is named Sir Tatton Sykes.

In 2018 the railway acquired another piece of rolling stock: BR 20T Brake Van B955043. The brake van arrived on site via low loader on 1 August in the same year. As of 20 October 2020, the brake van is being restored and has been painted BR freight grey; it is partway through being re-roofed. The restoration was completed in September 2023 and a ribbon cutting ceremony held on 17 September to mark it entering service. In 2024, the railway set up a fundraiser in order to construction a new maintenance shed on the current site, on top of the £100,000 already obtained from the UK Governments Shared Prosperity Fund prior in 2023, which will serve as a new visitor centre and workshop facility for the railway, which is currently still under construction as of 2025.

The Yorkshire Wolds Railway first opened to the public on 24 May 2015, with the official opening by Sir Tatton Sykes, on 25 May 2015. Currently it has a visitors centre and nearly 1,000 feet (300 m) of demonstration track with a turnout connecting the running line with the track upon which the Mk 1 BG stands.

The Yorkshire Wolds Railway is the only heritage railway in the East Riding of Yorkshire.

== Extension ==
The railway has plans to extend its operational length to 2 miles (3.2 km); this would involve running between the Fimber Halt site, opened when the project commenced, and the original Wetwang railway station for which the railway has permission to extend to. The railway has also had success bidding for funding from the East Riding of Yorkshire Council's LEADER programme and has received donations of track from local industrial railways including Drax Power Station.

Planning consent was granted on 17 May 2012 for the laying of 0.9 miles (72 chains) of track from Fimber Halt to the edge of a field. Further tracklaying would immediately involve crossing a green lane. A platform at Fimber Halt has been built which allows for easier boarding of trains, particularly when the brake van is ready for use.

In April 2026, the Yorkshire Wolds Railway began a new extension of the line into "Field 3", with this extension intending to be officially opened on the 18 October 2026 at 10:45 am. When opened, this will be the first time trains will be able to operate on the original alignment of the Malton and Driffield Junction Railway since it closed in 1958.

== Rolling stock ==
- GEC 0-4-0DH No. 5576 Sir Tatton Sykes (operational)
- Fowler 0-6-0DH No. 4240017 Patricia (under restoration)
- BR Mk 1 BG No. 92990 (static use)
- BR 20T Standard Brake Van B955043 (operational)
- BR Mk 2 TSO No. 6027 (under restoration)
- British Railways Salmon flat wagon

== See also ==
- Lincolnshire Wolds Railway
- Malton and Driffield Junction Railway
- Sledmere and Fimber railway station
- Wetwang railway station
