= Buckrose =

Former administrative division of Yorkshire, England

Coordinates: 54.054°N 0.768°W

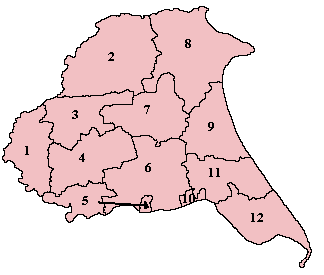
Wapentakes of the East Riding of Yorkshire. Buckrose is marked 2.

Buckrose was a wapentake of the historic East Riding of Yorkshire, England consisting of the north-west part of the county; its territory is now partly in the modern East Riding and partly in North Yorkshire. Established in medieval times, it ceased to have much significance in the 19th century when the wapentakes were succeeded by other administrative divisions for most local government purposes. Buckrose was formed from parishes of earlier wapentakes, including some from the Domesday-era wapentake of Toreshou.

Buckrose consisted of the parishes of Acklam, Birdsall, Bugthorpe, Burythorpe, Cowlam, Fridaythorpe, Helperthorpe, Heslerton, Kirby Grindalythe, Kirby Underdale, Langton, North Grimston, Norton, Rillington, Scrayingham, Settrington, Sherburn, Skirpenbeck, Sledmere, Thorpe Bassett, Weaverthorpe, Westow, Wetwang, Wharram-le-Street, Wharram Percy, Wintringham and Yedingham. The only town in the wapentake was Norton.

Buckrose gave its name to a parliamentary constituency which existed from 1885 to 1950; however, the Buckrose constituency extended well beyond the boundaries of the wapentake, and in fact took most of its electorate from towns in the neighbouring Dickering and Harthill wapentakes.
