= Burdale =

Burdale may refer to:-

- Burdale, North Yorkshire
  - Burdale railway station
  - Burdale Tunnel
- SS Burdale, a cargo ship
