= Wharram railway station =

Disused railway station in North Yorkshire, England

Wharram
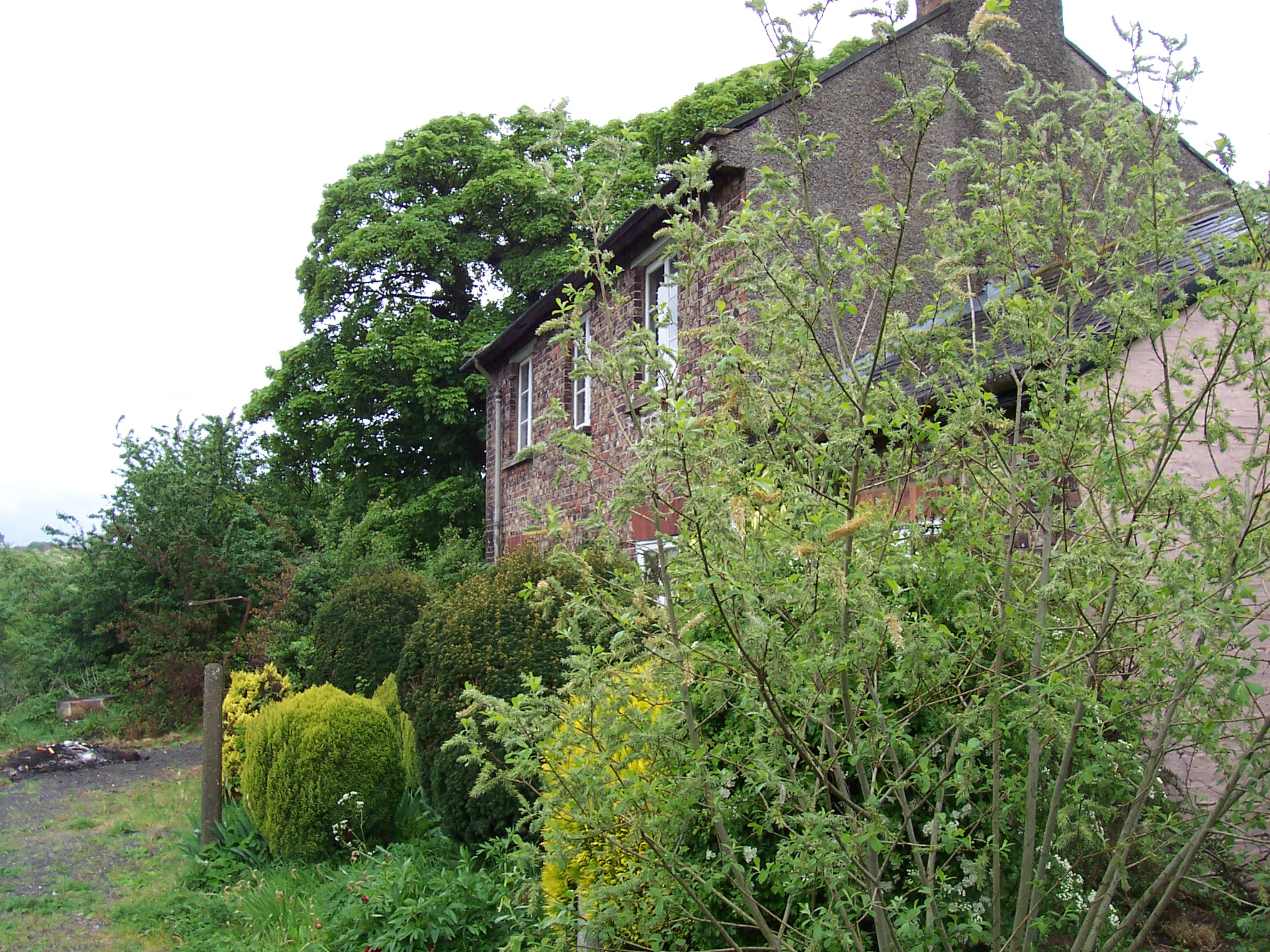
- The former station at Wharram

General information
- Location: Wharram-le-Street, North Yorkshire; England
- Coordinates: 54.076930°N 0.689380°W
- Grid reference: SE 858 653
- Platforms: 1

Other information
- Status: Disused

History
- Original company: Malton and Driffield Railway
- Pre-grouping: North Eastern Railway
- Post-grouping: London and North Eastern Railway

Key dates
- 19 May 1853: Opened
- 5 June 1950: Line and station closed to passengers
- 20 October 1958: Line and station closed completely
Location

Wharram railway station was opened by the Malton and Driffield Railway in May 1853, serving the village of Wharram-le-Street in North Yorkshire, England, although the area was in the East Riding of Yorkshire at the time. The station was also near the deserted medieval village of Wharram Percy and adjacent to Wharram chalk quarry.

The single platform station had a passing loop off its southern end, the only one on the line. It had the customary goods facilities for wayside stations, plus a siding into Wharram Quarry, dominated by a large chalk silo.

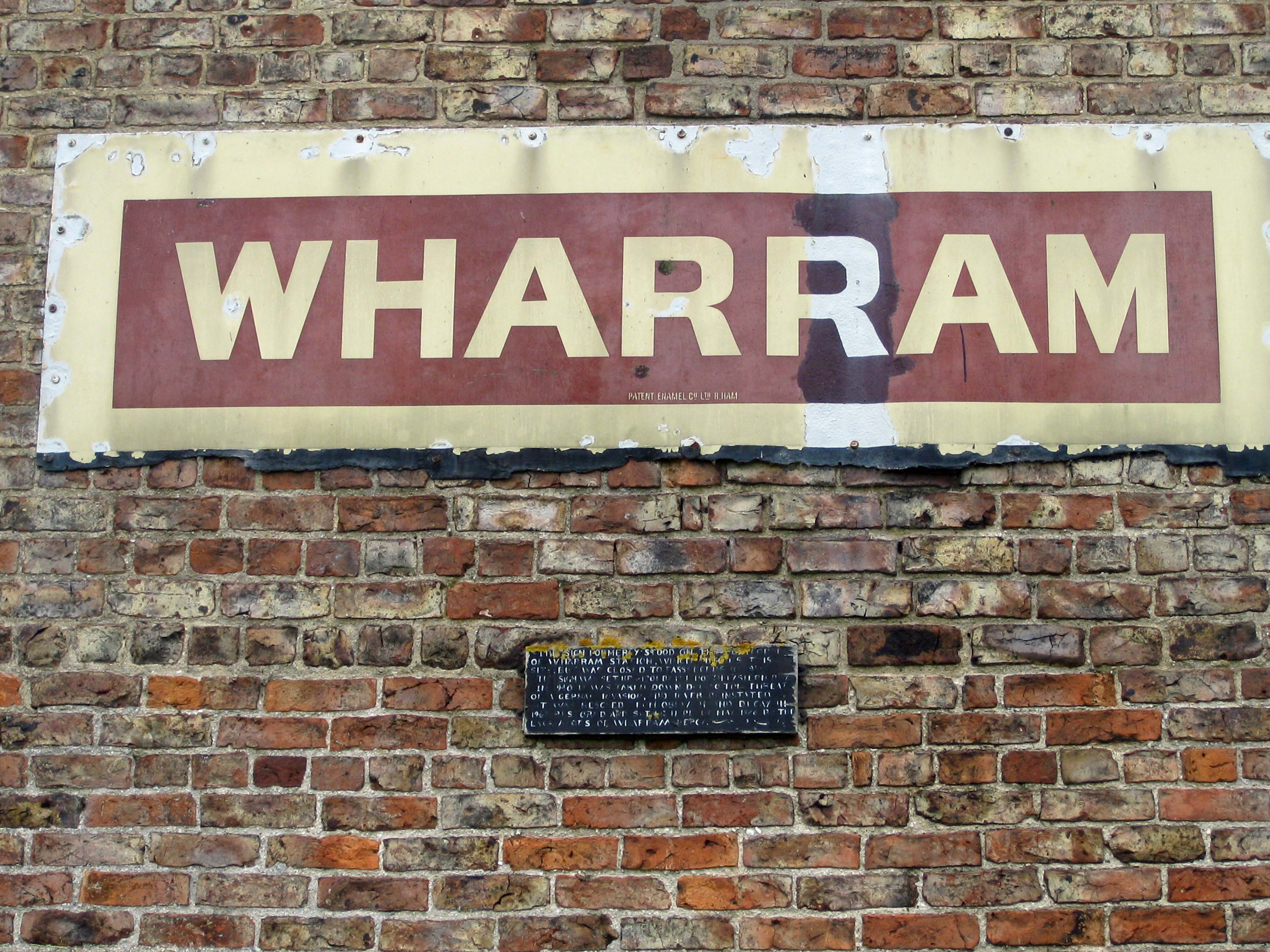
Enamel station sign

The line was originally conceived as part of a trunk route between Kingston-upon-Hull and the North East of England, but this came to very little. The station remained throughout its life as a country station on a country byway. In some periods of its life four passenger trains a day ran in each direction between Malton and Driffield, calling at all stations between, but for the most part just three called, with no Sunday service after the outbreak of the First World War. These trains were nicknamed the "Malton Dodger". They usually had either one or two coaches, often strengthened by one or more horse boxes in this racing country. Before the Second World War, intermittent excursion traffic called at Wharram to view the station's floral displays and well as the area's scenery.

In the summer of 1950, the station witnessed the passing of a Summer Saturday Filey to Newcastle train and return, which travelled via Driffield, Wharram and Gilling, joining the East Coast Main Line at Pilmoor Junction.

The station and line closed to passenger traffic in June 1950. Although it was said to be reasonably loaded on Saturdays (Market Days), it carried few people except schoolchildren otherwise. The line and station were reopened to passengers in February 1953 and February 1958 when the area's roads were impassable due to snow.

Freight traffic and occasional passenger specials continued until the line closed completely on 20 October 1958, the last pickup goods having called on the 18th.

The quarry had "followed a similar pattern to North Grimston - rapid expansion in the post-First World War boom, enormous output in the 1920s, declining in the 1930s and fizzling out after the Second World War." In 1919 a private siding was built in the quarry with exits in both directions onto the running line. Traffic growth was dramatic, peaking in 1925 with 107,261 tons of chalk forwarded to Thirsk, bypassing Malton as the line had originally been conceived. This was down to 38,562 tons in 1926 and to a mere 3,000 tons in 1929. The quarry closed in 1930. It reopened later in the 1930s, but its output was sporadic and small scale, mainly travelling by road in bags. Such rail traffic as there was was mainly coal for the quarry's kilns. The quarry was disused by 1960 and has become a wildlife reserve.

The track was lifted shortly after closure, but the station building remained in use as a private residence. In 2005 the station's water tower remained in place.

Preceding station	Disused railways	Following station
North Grimston; Line and station closed	North Eastern Railway; Malton and Driffield Railway	Burdale; Line and station closed

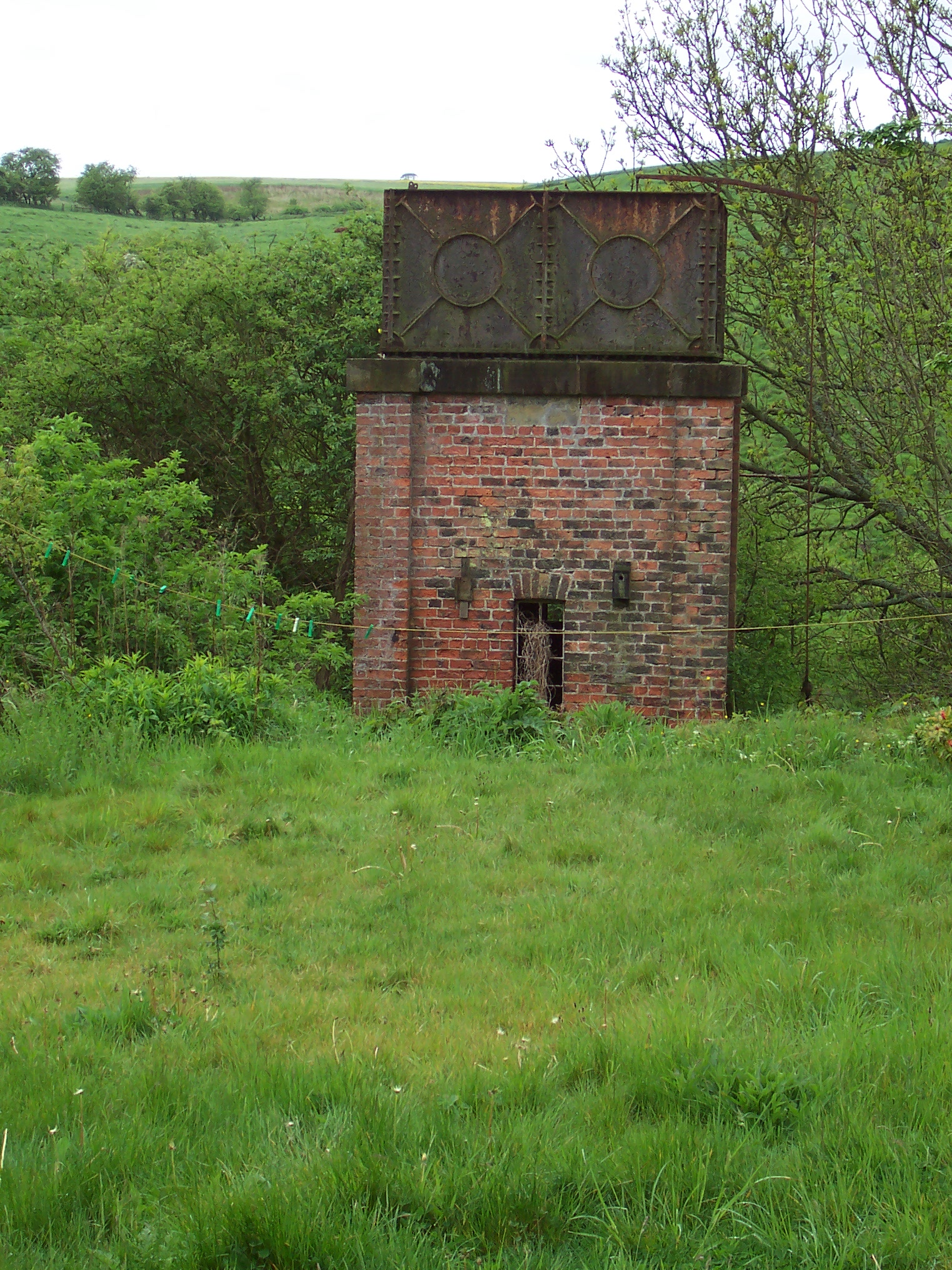
The water tower at Wharram station

== Further material ==
- Bradshaw, George (1968) [April 1910]. April 1910 Railway Guide. Newton Abbot: David & Charles. ISBN 978-0-7153-4246-6. OCLC 30645.
- Bradshaw, George (1985) [July 1922]. Bradshaw's General Railway and Steam Navigation guide for Great Britain and Ireland: A reprint of the July 1922 issue. Newton Abbot: David & Charles. ISBN 978-0-7153-8708-5. OCLC 12500436.
- Hoole, Ken (February 1959). Mansell, K.G. (ed.). "The Malton-Driffield Branch". Railway World. 20 (224). London: Railway World Limited.
