= Burdale Tunnel =

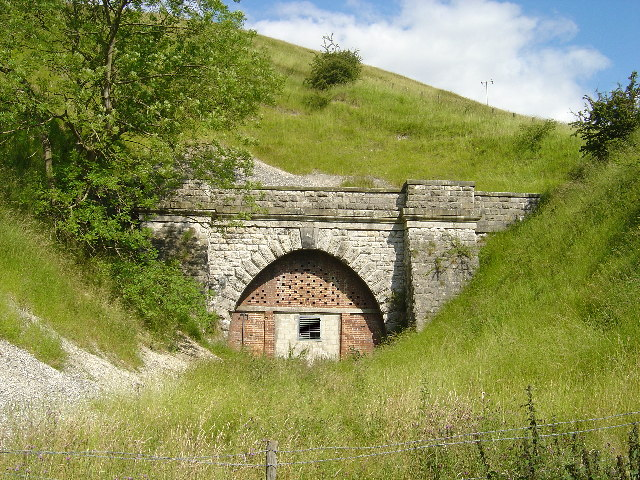
- Southern portal of Burdale Tunnel in July 2005
- Interactive map of Burdale Tunnel

Overview
- Line: Malton & Driffield Railway
- Location: Yorkshire Wolds
- Coordinates: 54.0633°N 0.6797°W

Operation
- Work began: 1847
- Opened: 19 May 1853
- Closed: 20 October 1958

Technical
- Length: 1,747 yards (1,597 m)
- No. of tracks: 1
- Track gauge: 4 ft 8 1/2 in (1,435 mm)

Burdale Tunnel is a former railway tunnel on the abandoned Malton and Driffield Junction Railway (MDR) in North Yorkshire, England. Construction of the tunnel began in 1847, but suffered financial difficulties and building was not complete until 1853. The line was closed completely a hundred years later in 1958, but the tunnel was still being used by members of the public, so the portals were bricked up in 1961. During 1970s and 1980s, there were collapses inside the tunnel and in 2009 the restoration of the passenger line could not continue due to the damage.

== History and description ==
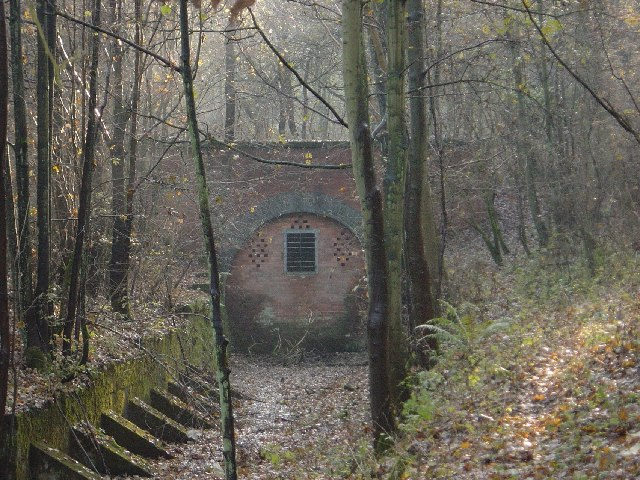
Northern Portal in November 2005

Burdale Tunnel lies near the village of Burdale, North Yorkshire, England, between the former Burdale and Wharram railway stations. It was built to take the railway through the Yorkshire Wolds. Construction began in 1847 with the sinking of seven vertical shafts, but the tunnel, which was 1,747 yards (1,597 m) in length, was not completed until 1853, work having been interrupted and slowed at times due to lack of funds. The lack of funds led to alternate lengths being proposed, including a 1,606 yards (1,469 m) route which would have meant a steep incline. During construction illegal drinking houses were built and riots occurred in navvies' temporary accommodation near the tunnel's northern mouth.

The line closed to passenger traffic in 1950 and closed completely in 1958, with the tracks being lifted shortly afterwards. However, the closure did not deter visitors and therefore the tunnel portals were bricked up in 1961. In the late 1970s, a collapse occurred just north of the tunnel's second ventilation shaft – around half-a-mile in. During the 1980s the tunnel collapsed further, blocking a middle section completely.

== Restoration plans ==
In 2009, the Yorkshire Wolds Railway Restoration Project proposed that the railway could be reopened though the condition of the Burdale Tunnel collapse was still unknown.

== See also ==
- Yorkshire Wolds Railway
