= Wetwang railway station =

Disused railway station in the East Riding of Yorkshire, England

Wetwang
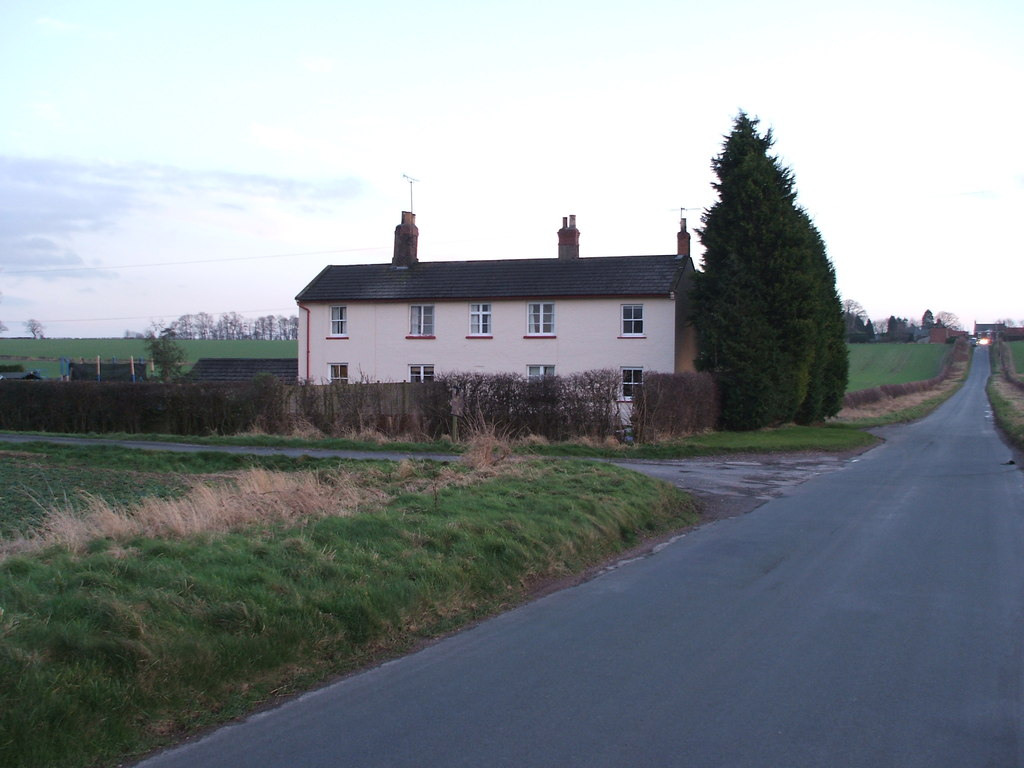
- Site of the former station in February 2008

General information
- Location: Wetwang, East Riding of Yorkshire; England
- Coordinates: 54.024413°N 0.576540°W
- Grid reference: SE933596
- Platforms: 1

Other information
- Status: Disused

History
- Original company: Malton and Driffield Railway
- Pre-grouping: North Eastern Railway
- Post-grouping: London and North Eastern Railway

Key dates
- 19 May 1853: Opened
- 5 June 1950: Closed for passengers
- 20 October 1958: Closed for goods
Location

Wetwang railway station (SE933596) was a railway station on the Malton & Driffield Railway in the East Riding of Yorkshire, England. It served the village of Wetwang, opened on 19 May 1853, and closed for passengers on 5 June 1950 and goods on 20 October 1958. For passenger traffic, Wetwang was the busiest station on the MDR.

== Potential reopening ==
The Yorkshire Wolds Railway (as of 2009 the only heritage railway in the East Riding of Yorkshire) operates on a short section of track close to the village of Fimber.

The railway has plans to extend its operational length to 2 miles (3.2 km); this would involve running between the Fimber Halt site, opened when the project commenced, and the original Wetwang railway station for which the railway has permission to extend to.

Preceding station	Disused railways	Following station
Sledmere & Fimber	North Eastern Railway; Malton & Driffield Railway	Garton
