= Settrington =

Village and civil parish in North Yorkshire, England

Coordinates: 54°07′29″N 0°43′27″W

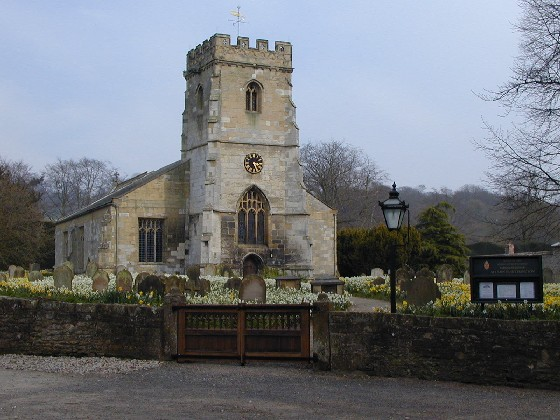
- All Saints' Church, Settrington

- Location within North Yorkshire
- Population: 316 (2011 census)
- OS grid reference: SE834705
- Civil parish: Settrington
- Unitary authority: North Yorkshire
- Ceremonial county: North Yorkshire
- Region: Yorkshire and the Humber
- Country: England
- Sovereign state: United Kingdom
- Post town: MALTON
- Postcode district: YO17
- Police: North Yorkshire
- Fire: North Yorkshire
- Ambulance: Yorkshire
- UK Parliament: Thirsk and Malton

Settrington is a village and civil parish in North Yorkshire, England, about 3 miles (5 km) east of Malton. It was historically part of the East Riding of Yorkshire until 1974 and part of the Ryedale district from 1974 until 2023.

== History ==
Settrington is mentioned in the Domesday Book of 1086 as belonging to Berengar of Tosny, and having 16 villagers, two ploughlands, and 20 acres (8.1 ha) of meadow. The book lists its entry as Sendriton, and the name derives from a personal name of Old English Sǣtere and tūn meaning town.

Sir Francis Bigod of Settrington launched Bigod's Rebellion against King Henry VIII in January 1537. Sir Francis Bigod was hanged, drawn and quartered on Tyburn Hill on 2 June 1537. His manor was granted to Matthew Stewart, Earl of Lennox and Lady Margaret Douglas by Henry VIII.

Settrington was served by Settrington railway station on the Malton and Driffield Railway between 1853 and 1950. The station was to the south of the village on Grimston Lane.

The village has a church at the south end of the village, whilst the primary school is on the northern side. The middle of Settrington is divided by the village stream; Settrington Beck. An Ofsted inspection of the primary school in 2023 rated it as being Good. The Church of All Saints was built in the late 12th/early 13th century, and is listed with Historic England as a grade II* structure. Settrington Beck flows for 6.8 miles (11 km) from the south, northwards through Settrington to join the River Derwent at Scagglethorpe. There is a mill-pond on the beck at the south end of the village.

The long-distance path, the Centenary Way passes through the village.

== Mythology and Folklore ==
Built in the centre of a once great wood, Settrington and nearby villages such as Scagglethorpe and North Grimston have a rich collection of folklore, from common fae such as trolls, boggarts and moss folk to wyrms, kelpies and even a typical Yorkshiredragon.

Stories of werewolves and the barguest have also appeared in nearby villages but not in Settrington itself.

Many of the buildings in Settrington are said to be haunted.

== Governance ==
The village and parish were historically in the wapentake of Buckrose, in the old East Riding of Yorkshire. In 1974, it was moved into the county of North Yorkshire, as part of the Ryedale District.

Population of Settrington 1801–2015
Year	1801	1811	1821	1831	1841	1851	1861	1871	1881	1891	1901	1911	1921	1931	1951	1961	1971	2001	2011	2015
Village	414	510	535	527	492	550	556	512	555	488	475	495	448	411	355	325	323			
Parish	614	729	757	779	741	825	871	777	802	685	669							339	316	290 (Note: Estimated population.)

== See also ==
- Listed buildings in Settrington
