= Church of St Mary, Wharram =

Coordinates: 54°4′N 0°41′W

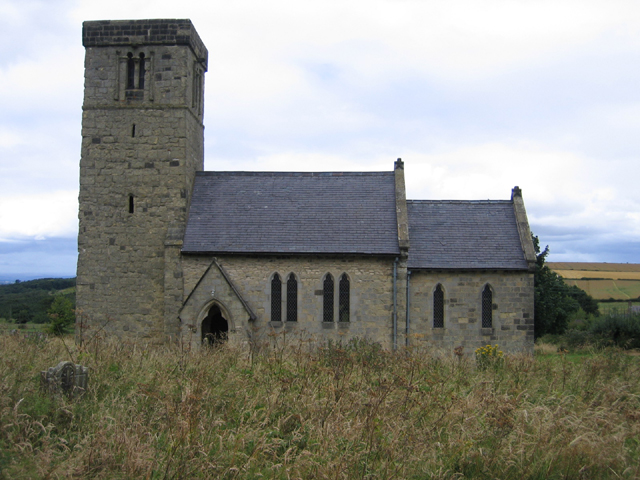
- Church of St Mary, Wharram

- Location in North Yorkshire
- OS grid reference: SE 86393 65928
- Location: Wharram-le-Street, North Yorkshire
- Country: England
- Denomination: Anglican
- Website: A Church Near You

History
- Dedication: Saint Mary

Architecture
- Heritage designation: Grade I
- Designated: 10 October 1966
- Architectural type: Church
- Style: Norman

St Mary is an Anglican church in Wharram-le-Street, North Yorkshire, England. It is recorded in the National Heritage List for England as a designated Grade I listed building. The church belongs to the Wolds Valley benefice within the Diocese of York, along with Helperthorpe, Kirby Grindalythe, Luttons Ambo, and Weaverthorpe. About 1 mile (1.6 km) south of the church is the deserted medieval village of Wharram Percy and the ruins of St Martin's Church, which dates to a similar period.

== Architecture ==
The nave and lower part of the west tower were built in the early or mid-11th century, in the last decades before the Norman conquest of England. The top of the tower is slightly later, representing the Saxo-Norman overlap architecture of the late 11th or early 12th century. The chancel arch is pure Norman, the north aisle was added in the 14th century and the chancel was rebuilt in 1862–64.

== See also ==
- Grade I listed buildings in North Yorkshire (district)
- Listed buildings in Wharram

== Sources ==
- Pevsner, Nikolaus (1972). Yorkshire: York & the East Riding. The Buildings of England. Harmondsworth: Penguin Books. pp. 367–8. ISBN 0-14-0710-43-4.
