= Burdale railway station =

Disused railway station in North Yorkshire, England

Burdale
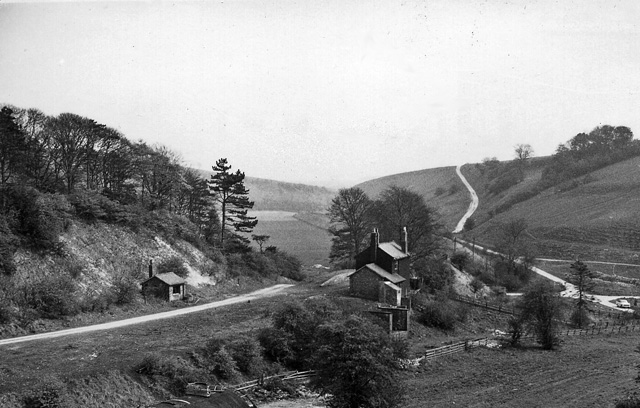
- The remains of the station in April 1961

General information
- Location: Burdale, North Yorkshire; England
- Coordinates: 54.050638°N 0.669800°W
- Grid reference: SE872624
- Platforms: 1

Other information
- Status: Disused

History
- Original company: Malton and Driffield Junction Railway
- Pre-grouping: North Eastern Railway
- Post-grouping: London and North Eastern Railway

Key dates
- 19 May 1853: Opened
- 5 June 1950: Closed
Location

Burdale railway station was a station on the Malton and Driffield Junction Railway in North Yorkshire, England.

== History and description ==
Burdale station was situated just south of the 1,747-yard (1,597 m) Burdale Tunnel. It opened on 19 May 1853, and served both the hamlet and large quarry in Burdale, North Yorkshire.

The station closed on 5 June 1950.

== See also ==
- Yorkshire Wolds Railway

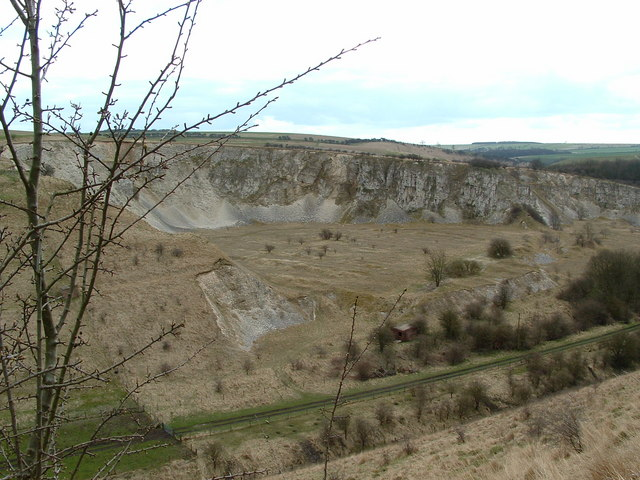
View of Burdale Quarry showing course of disused railway line in April 2006

Preceding station	Disused railways	Following station
Wharram	Malton & Driffield Railway	Sledmere & Fimber
