= North Grimston sword =

Iron Age sword found in North Grimston, England

- Material: Iron blade and copper alloy hilt
- Created: 2nd century BC
- Period/culture: Iron Age
- Discovered: 1902; North Grimston, North Yorkshire
- Present location: Hull and East Riding Museum, Hull.

The North Grimston Sword is a sword dating to the Iron Age found at North Grimston in 1902. It is in the collection of the Hull and East Riding Museum.

== Discovery ==
The sword was found in 1902 and first reported by John Robert Mortimer in 1905 who thought it dated to the Roman period. It was found with another, large, sword, bronze rings, and fragmentary remains of a shield.

== Description ==
The sword has an iron blade with a copper alloy guard, grip, and hilt in the form of a stylised anthropomorphic figure. Stuart Piggott classified it as an 'anthropoid-hilted dagger' and a variant of his broader Group II of Iron Age swords, dating from the second and first centuries BC.
