= Wharram-le-Street =

Village and civil parish in North Yorkshire, England

Coordinates: 54.0818°N 0.6824°W

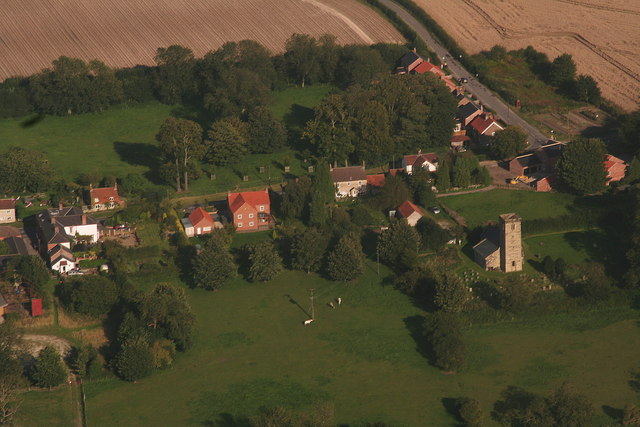
- Wharram-le-Street, aerial

- Location within North Yorkshire
- OS grid reference: SE8665
- Civil parish: Wharram
- Unitary authority: North Yorkshire
- Ceremonial county: North Yorkshire
- Region: Yorkshire and the Humber
- Country: England
- Sovereign state: United Kingdom
- Post town: MALTON
- Postcode district: YO17
- Dialling code: 01944
- Police: North Yorkshire
- Fire: North Yorkshire
- Ambulance: Yorkshire
- UK Parliament: Thirsk and Malton

Wharram-le-Street is a village and former civil parish, now in the parish of Wharram, in North Yorkshire, England.

Until the 1974 local government reorganisation, Wharram-le-Street was part of the East Riding of Yorkshire, and from 1974 to 2023 it was part of the district of Ryedale. Since 2023, it is administered by the unitary North Yorkshire Council.

The village is on the B1248 road between North Grimston and the boundary with the present East Riding of Yorkshire unitary authority.

The Church of England parish church of St Mary is late Anglo-Saxon and is a Grade I listed building.

== History ==
The name Wharram possibly derives from the plural form of either the Old English hwer meaning 'cauldron', or the Old Norse hvarf meaning 'bend'. The affix "le-Street" in the toponym refers to the fact that the village is beside the course of a former Roman road. The Domesday Book of 1086 records the manor as Warham. About 1 mile (1.6 km) south of the village is the deserted medieval village of Wharram Percy. Wharram railway station on the Malton and Driffield Railway served the village from 1853 to 1950. On 1 April 1935 the parish was abolished and merged with Raisthorpe and Burdale and Wharram Percy to form Wharram.

In 1931 the parish had a population of 133.

== See also ==
- Listed buildings in Wharram

== Sources ==
- Pevsner, Nikolaus (1972). Yorkshire: York & the East Riding. The Buildings of England. Harmondsworth: Penguin Books. pp. 367–8. ISBN 0-14-0710-43-4.
