= Settrington railway station =

Disused railway station in North Yorkshire, England

Settrington
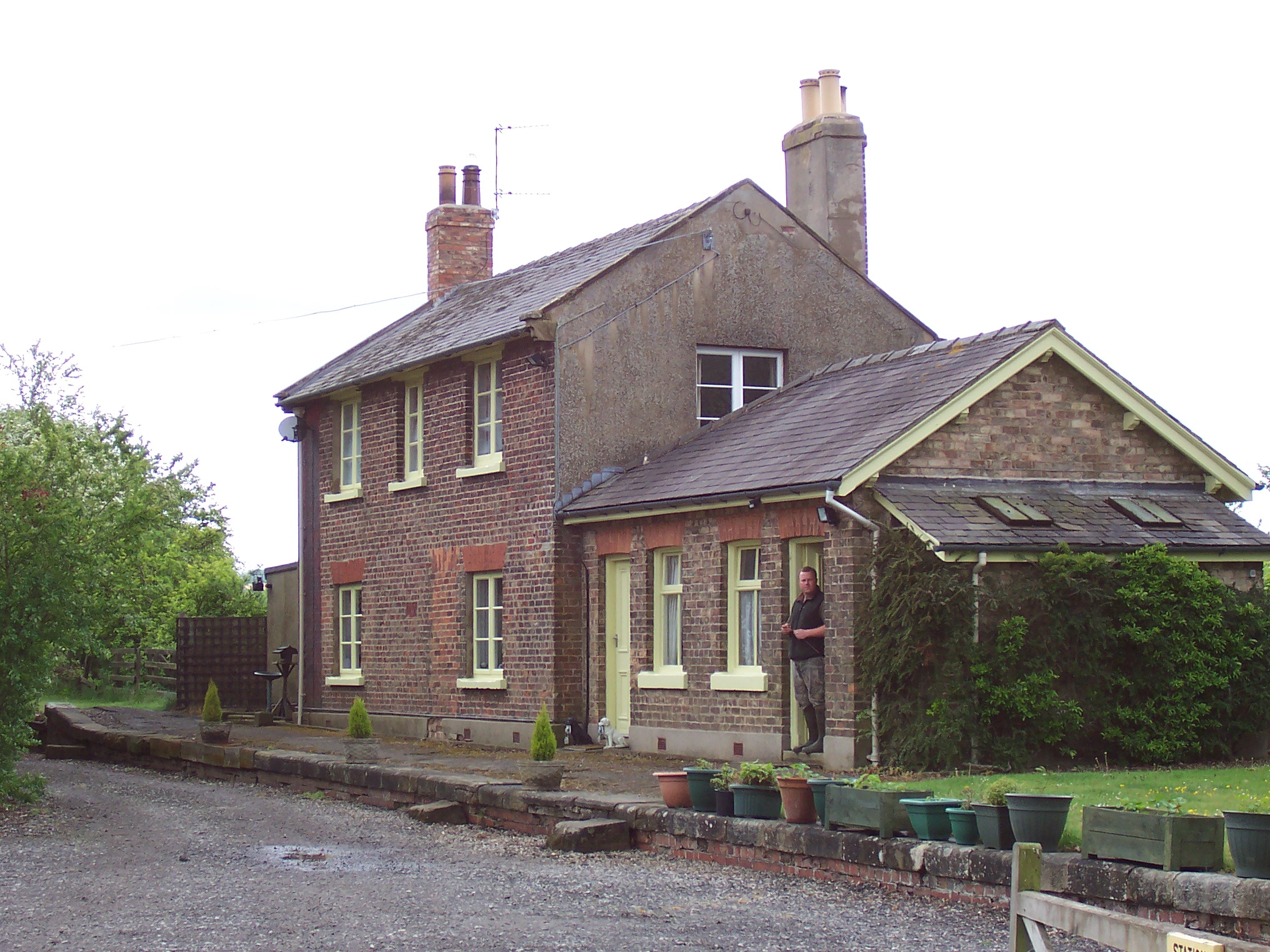
- The former station at Settrington in May 2007

General information
- Location: Settrington, North Yorkshire; England
- Coordinates: 54.115336°N 0.722284°W
- Grid reference: SE836695
- Platforms: 1

Other information
- Status: Disused

History
- Original company: Malton and Driffield Junction Railway
- Pre-grouping: North Eastern Railway
- Post-grouping: London and North Eastern Railway

Key dates
- 19 May 1853: Opened
- 5 June 1950: Closed for passengers
- 20 October 1958: Closed for goods
Location

Settrington railway station was a railway station on the Malton & Driffield Railway in North Yorkshire, England. It opened on 19 May 1853, and served the village of Settrington. It closed for passengers on 5 June 1950 and goods on 20 October 1958.

Preceding station	Disused railways	Following station
Malton	Malton & Driffield Railway	North Grimston
