= Sledmere and Fimber railway station =

Disused railway station in the East Riding of Yorkshire, England

Sledmere and Fimber
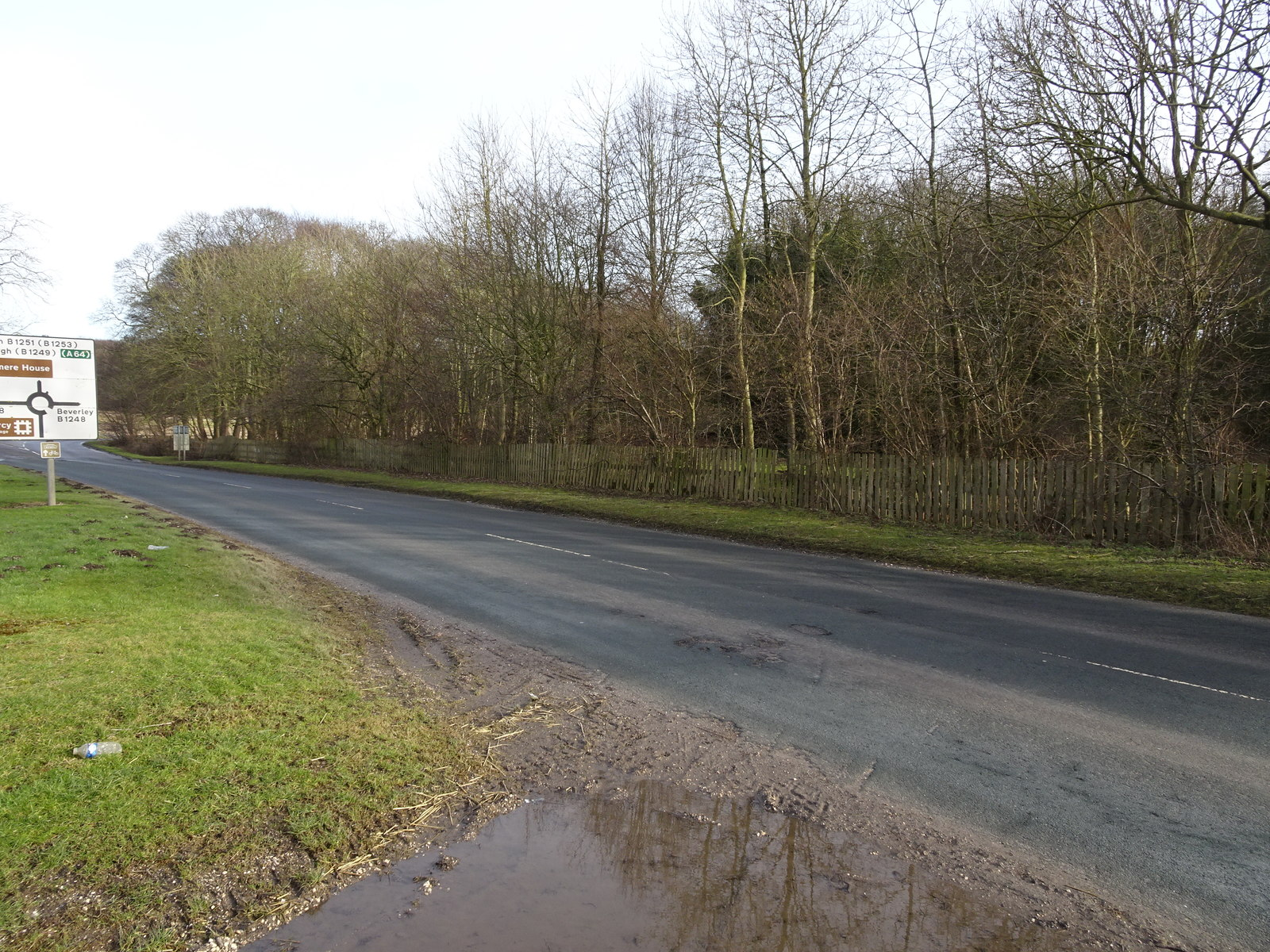
- Site of the former station in February 2018

General information
- Location: Sledmere and Fimber, East Riding of Yorkshire; England
- Coordinates: 54.037420°N 0.612745°W
- Grid reference: SE909610
- Platforms: 1

Other information
- Status: Disused

History
- Original company: Malton and Driffield Junction Railway
- Pre-grouping: North Eastern Railway
- Post-grouping: London and North Eastern Railway

Key dates
- 19 May 1853: Opened
- 5 June 1950: Closed for passengers
- 20 October 1958: Closed for goods
Location

Sledmere and Fimber railway station was a railway station on the Malton & Driffield Railway in the East Riding of Yorkshire, England.

== History ==
The station was opened on 19 May 1853. It was sited between the villages of Sledmere and Fimber. It was closed to passengers on 5 June 1950 but remained open for goods traffic until 20 October 1958. The station was named "Fimber" until March 1858, when it briefly became "Sledmere" until May 1859, when it became "Sledmere and Fimber" until final closure of the line.

Despite being remote from both Sledmere and Fimber, the station was the most important on the MDR in terms of traffic and receipts.

=== Preservation ===
In October 2008, the Yorkshire Wolds Railway was formed by a group of enthusiasts aiming to restore a section of the former M&D branch near the original Sledmere and Fimber railway station as a heritage tourist attraction.

Preceding station	Disused railways	Following station
Burdale	North Eastern Railway; Malton & Driffield Railway	Wetwang
