= North Grimston railway station =

Disused railway station in North Yorkshire, England

North Grimston
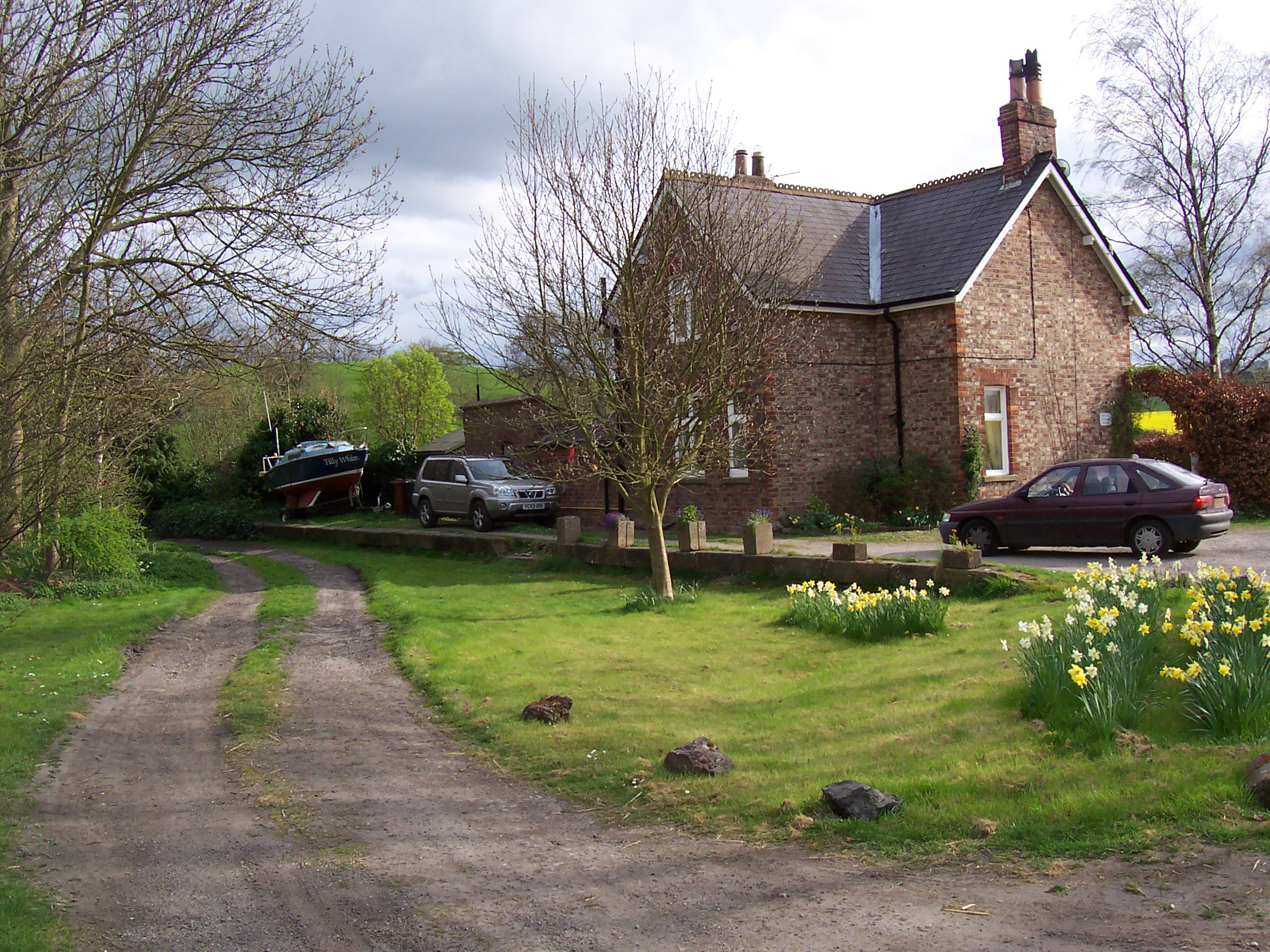
- The former station at North Grimston in April 2007

General information
- Location: North Grimston, North Yorkshire; England
- Coordinates: 54.097908°N 0.717774°W
- Grid reference: SE839676
- Platforms: 1

Other information
- Status: Disused

History
- Original company: Malton and Driffield Railway
- Pre-grouping: North Eastern Railway
- Post-grouping: London and North Eastern Railway

Key dates
- 19 May 1853: Opened
- 5 June 1950: Closed for passengers
- 20 October 1958: Closed for goods
Location

North Grimston railway station was a railway station on the Malton & Driffield Railway. It opened on 19 May 1853, and served the village of North Grimston, North Yorkshire, England. It closed on 5 June 1950 but the station remained open for goods traffic until 18 October 1958 when the line finally closed. The station was unusual in that the single platform was bisected by a road with a level crossing.

Preceding station	Disused railways	Following station
Settrington	Malton & Driffield Railway	Wharram
