= Brake gangwayed =

Railway passenger brake van

British Rail brake gangwayed
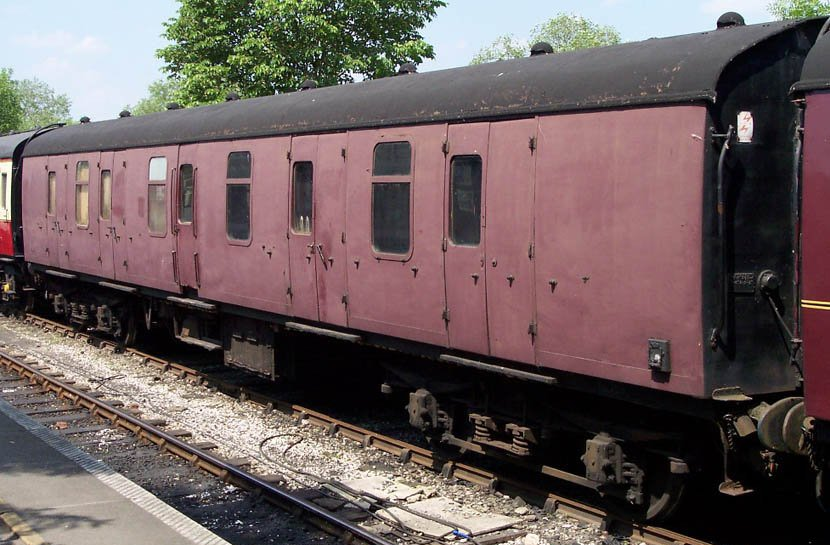
- BG Number 81020 pictured at the Midland Railway - Butterley on 9 June 2006, without lettering or numbering
- In service: 1951–
- Manufacturers: BR Derby (C&W), Eastleigh, Wolverton & York; Birmingham Railway Carriage and Wagon Company, Cravens, Metro-Cammell, Pressed Steel Company, Gloucester Railway Carriage and Wagon Company
- Family name: British Railways Mark 1
- Constructed: 1951–1963
- Number built: 1,129
- Fleet numbers: 80500–81628
- Capacity: 10 tonnes
- Operator: British Rail

Specifications
- Car length: 57 ft 0 in (17.37 m)
- Width: 9 ft 3 in (2.82 m)
- Height: 12 ft 9 in (3.89 m)
- Maximum speed: BR1: 90 mph (145 km/h); B4: 100 mph (161 km/h), later some 110 mph (177 km/h)
- Weight: 31–32 tonnes
- Bogies: BR1, some later B4
- Braking systems: Vacuum, air, or both
- Track gauge: 4 ft 8 1/2 in (1,435 mm)

The brake gangwayed or BG coach (also known as a full brake) is a type of British Railways Mark 1 passenger brake van. It has a guard's compartment in the centre and two large areas either side for storing luggage. They were a versatile type of coach that could be found all over the British Railways network, and some are still in use today – although not in conventional use.

The British Railways Mark 1 BG was shorter than most other types of Mark 1 coach – the BGs being 57 feet (17.37 m) whereas most other designs were 63 feet (19.20 m). This was so the BG could go everywhere, unlike their other Mark 1 counterparts, which were banned from some station platforms because of their length.

Around 101 of these vehicles are still in existence, though, as mentioned above, most of these are not in conventional use. Many vehicles, particularly those on preserved railways, are used for storing spare parts for various preservation societies. Simultaneously, several BGs have been converted for entirely different uses, due to the large space either side of the guard's compartment and the relative 'ease' of conversion. Three vehicles have been converted into disabled coaches, with one, 80776, on the Severn Valley Railway (which won the 1996 ARPS Coach Competition), a second, 80509, on the North Yorkshire Moors Railway, and a third, 80736, on the West Somerset Railway.

A second vehicle at the WSR, 80972, had been used as an engineering stores vehicle until 16 March 2018, when it was transferred to the Somerset and Dorset Railway Trust (SDRT) at Washford station, where it will be converted to house a museum. 80972 has since been sent to the Somerset and Dorset Heritage Trust (S&DHT) at Midsomer Norton South. It has been converted to house the emporium shop and to house a N gauge model railway of the area, replacing a Covered Carriage Truck (CCT) in this role.

A vehicle at the Severn Valley, 81013, has been converted for use as Santa's Grotto during December, as have two vehicles at the Embsay and Bolton Abbey Steam Railway, 81517, and 80830, and two vehicles at the Midland Railway - Butterley, 81020 and 81144, though these latter two are also used as disco coaches.

Elsewhere, four vehicles, 80654 at the Dean Forest Railway, 80993 at the East Lancashire Railway, 81033 at the North Norfolk Railway, and 81486 at the Gwili Railway, have all been converted into kitchen cars, with 80654 used as part of the café at Norchard Station, and 80993, 81033, and 81486 being an integral part of their respective line's dining trains, four vehicles, 80933 at the East Lancs, 81023 at West Coast Railways's base at Carnforth, 80903 at Eastleigh Arriva TrainCare, and 81448 at Crewe LNWR Heritage Company, have been converted into generator vans to provide on train heating, one vehicle at the Yorkshire Wolds Railway, 81305, has been converted into the site's static Visitors' Centre and Shop, one vehicle at the Bodmin & Wenford Railway, 80702, has been converted for use as a catering bar car in the line's dining set, and one vehicle at the National Railway Museum, 81025, has been converted into a static catering facility and given the name "Countess of York".

Additionally, vehicle number 81432, previously based at Crewe, is to be converted into a bar/kitchen car by the Spa Valley Railway sometime during 2018.
