= Driffield railway station =

Railway station in the East Riding of Yorkshire, England

Driffield
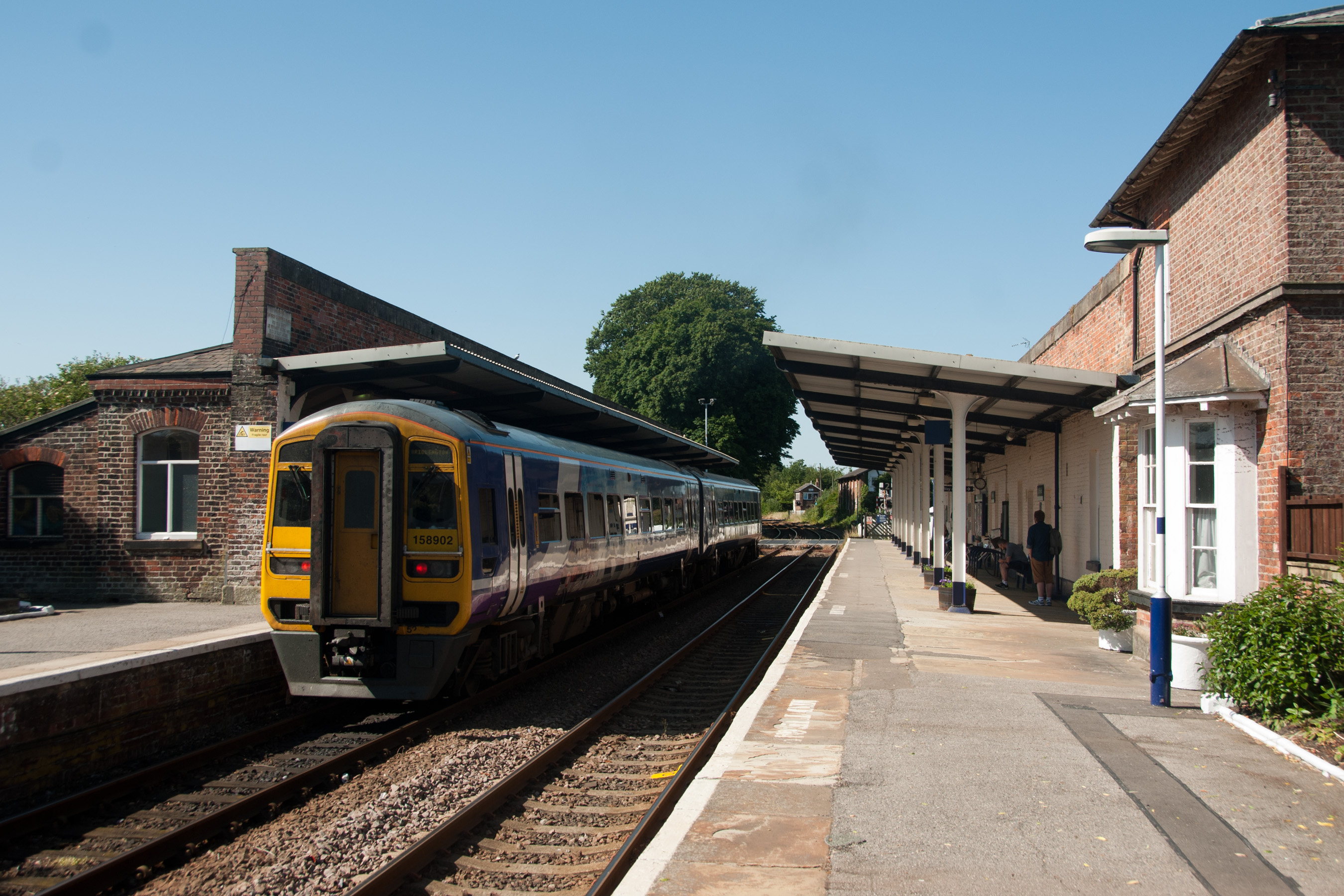
- Class 158 no. 158902 on Bridlington to Hull service at Driffield station in June 2018

General information
- Location: Driffield, East Riding of Yorkshire; England
- Coordinates: 54.00150°N 0.43200°W
- Grid reference: TA027573
- Managed by: Northern
- Platforms: 2

Other information
- Station code: DRF
- Classification: DfT category F1

Passengers
- 2020/21: ▼63,002
- 2021/22: ▲0.212 million
- 2022/23: ▲0.240 million
- 2023/24: ▲0.244 million
- 2024/25: ▲0.275 million
Location
Notes
- Passenger statistics from the Office of Rail and Road

Driffield railway station serves the town of Driffield in the East Riding of Yorkshire, England. It is located on the Hull–Scarborough line and is operated by Northern, providing all passenger train services.

== History ==
The station was opened by the York and North Midland Railway on 6 October 1846, at the same time as the line from Hull to Bridlington. The independent Malton & Driffield Railway company obtained parliamentary approval to build a branch line between there and Malton in the same year, but more than six years would pass before it was ready for traffic, the first train running on 19 May 1853.

This was never more than a rural branch line, but the final route into the town, from Selby via Market Weighton (opened on 1 May 1890), proved rather more important as it soon became busy with holiday traffic from the West Riding heading for the resorts further up the coast. Today, though only the original coast line remains in use, the Malton line having succumbed to road competition on 5 June 1950, the Selby line falling victim to the Beeching Axe almost exactly fifteen years later (closing on 14 June 1965).

== Facilities ==
The station is staffed part-time, with the ticket office open from 07:15 to 13:30 six days per week (closed on Sundays). A ticket machine is also available. Waiting rooms are provided on both platforms. Train running information is offered by digital information screens, telephone and timetable posters. Both platforms have step-free access.

== Services ==
The station has a twice-hourly service in each direction to Hull and Bridlington on weekdays, with alternate northbound trains continuing onwards to Scarborough. Many of the Hull services run through to Doncaster and Sheffield or York via Selby. There is an hourly service each way on Sundays to Scarborough and Sheffield throughout the year (rather than in summer only) since the timetable change in December 2009.

== Notes ==
Preceding station	National Rail	Following station
Hutton Cranswick	Northern Hull–Scarborough line	Nafferton
Historical railways
Hutton Cranswick	Y&NMR Hull and Scarborough Line	Nafferton
Disused railways
Garton	Malton & Driffield Railway	Terminus
Southburn	NER Selby to Driffield Line	Terminus
