= NER Class A =

Class of British steam locomotives

NER Class A LNER Class F8
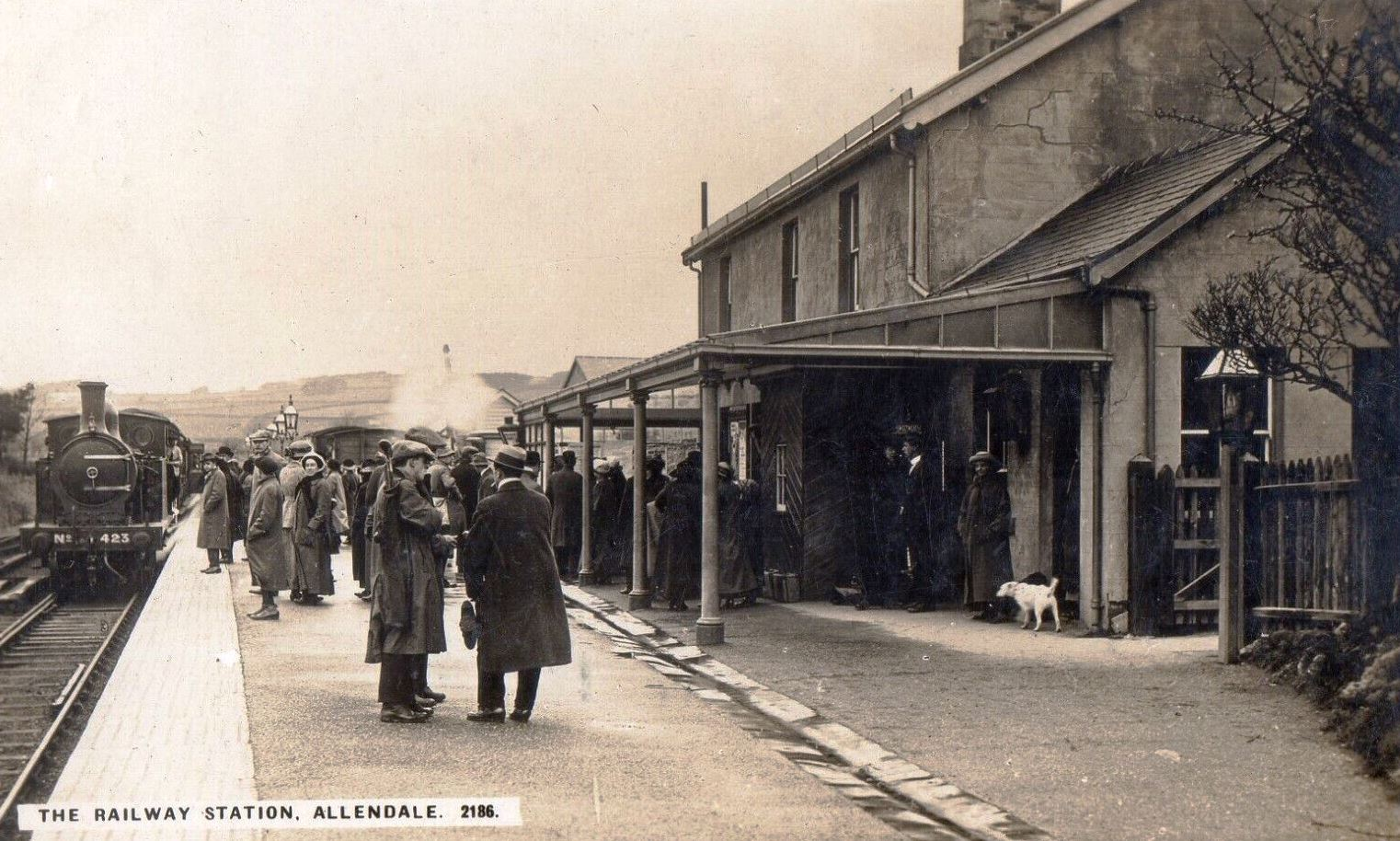
- No. 423 at Allendale railway station
Type and origin
- Power type: Steam
- Designer: T.W Worsdell
- Builder: NER Gateshead
- Build date: 1886-1892
- Total produced: 60
Specifications
- Configuration
  - Whyte: 2-4-2T
- Gauge: 4 ft 8 1/2 in (1,435 mm)
- Driver dia.: 5 ft 7.25 in (1.7082 m)
- Loco weight: 53.8 long tons (54.7 t)
- Fuel type: coal
- Boiler pressure: 160 psi (1.10 MPa)
- Cylinders: two inside
- Cylinder size: 18 in x 24 in (432 mm x 610 mm)
Performance figures
- Tractive effort: 15,725 lbf (69.9 kN)
Career
- Operators: North Eastern Railway, London North Eastern Railway
- Class: A
- Withdrawn: 1928-1938

The NER Class A (LNER Class F8) was a class of 2-4-2 tank locomotives designed by Thomas William Worsdell and built at Gateshead works for the North Eastern Railway (NER). Sixty locomotives were built between 1886 and 1892. At this time the class was designated class A by the NER and was the first class in the company to be given an alphabetical letter classification.

== Design ==
=== Boiler ===
They were the first locomotives to use steel instead of iron for the boiler. At the time, the steel boiler was built to a non-standard design that could not be exchanged with any other class of locomotive. However, the design later evolved to become Diagram 69 under the LNER and was used on classes D23, G5, J24 and J73.

=== Fittings ===
Worsdell gave the Class A some design features that would become characteristic of most NER locos from then on. These included a tapered chimney, a brass cover for the safety valves and a large protective cab.

=== Cylinders ===
The first forty of the class had 18 inch diameter cylinders, while last twenty had 17 inch cylinders. The 17 inch cylinders were enlarged to 18 inches during rebuilding in 1900,

=== Brakes ===
All 60 of the class were originally built with Westinghouse air brakes. Forty-two were fitted with vacuum ejectors in a programme during 1929 and 1930. However, withdrawal of the class had begun in 1928 and 18 of the class never received vacuum ejectors.

== Use ==
During its working life the class could be found all over the NER system working on suburban lines and country branch lines. During their life with the LNER they were mostly kept around Tyneside, Teesside, Hull and Leeds where they handled lightweight traffic. Withdrawals of the class began in 1928 and finished in 1938. The last loco was No. 420, working at Tyne Dock. It was condemned on 22 April 1938 and the class slipped into history with none being preserved.
