= North Grimston =

Village in North Yorkshire, England

Coordinates: 54°05′55″N 0°42′48″W

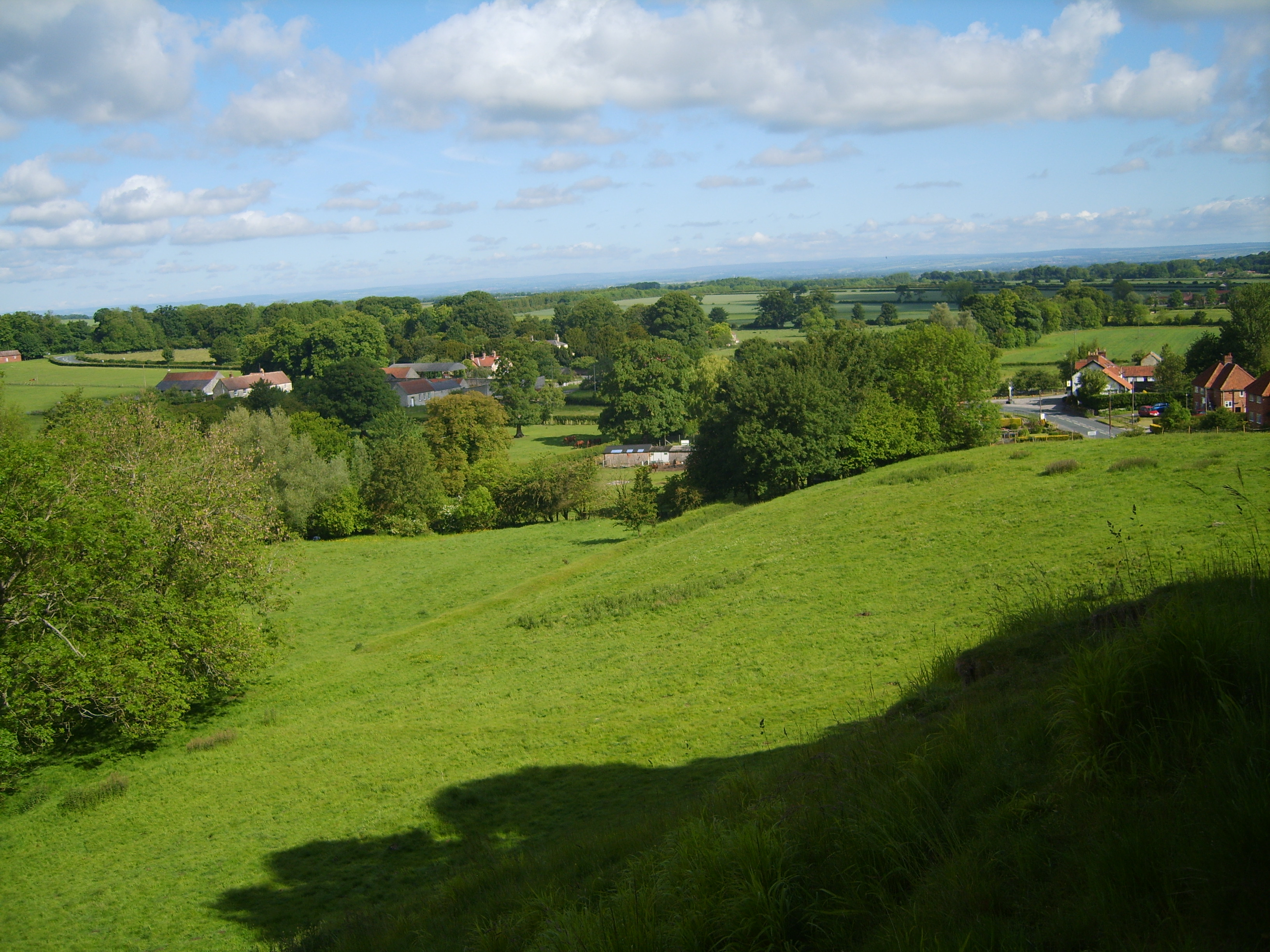
- Looking over North Grimston

- Location within North Yorkshire
- OS grid reference: SE841677
- Civil parish: Birdsall
- Unitary authority: North Yorkshire
- Ceremonial county: North Yorkshire
- Region: Yorkshire and the Humber
- Country: England
- Sovereign state: United Kingdom
- Post town: MALTON
- Postcode district: YO17
- Police: North Yorkshire
- Fire: North Yorkshire
- Ambulance: Yorkshire
- UK Parliament: Thirsk and Malton

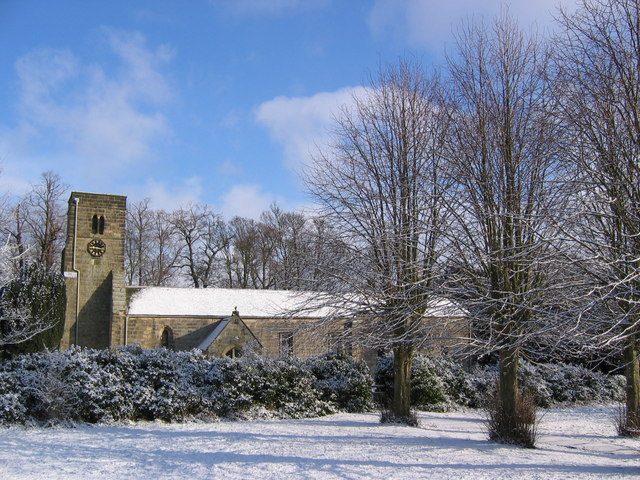
St Nicholas Church, North Grimston

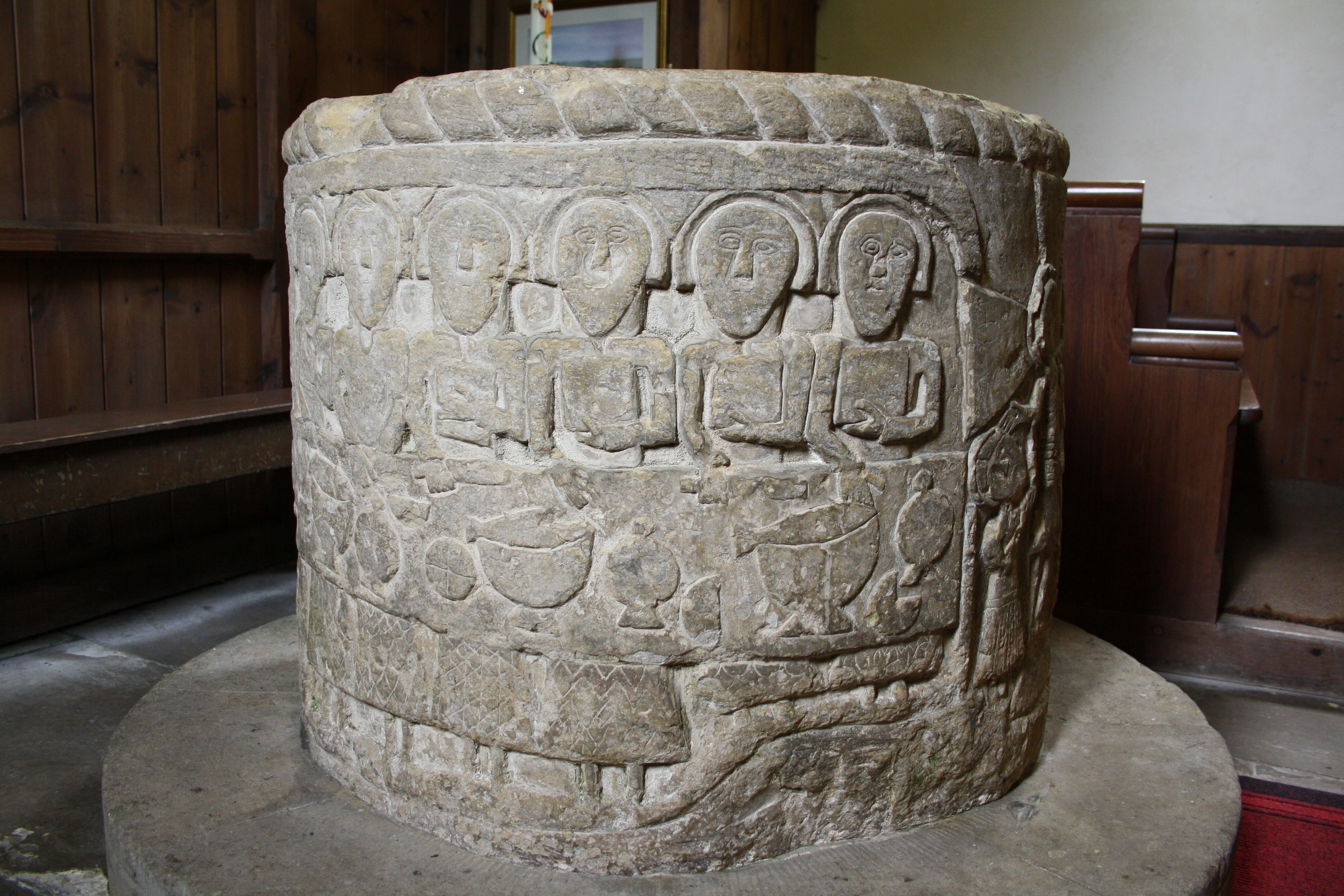
The font, St Nicholas Church

North Grimston is a village in the civil parish of Birdsall, in North Yorkshire, England. It is situated between Norton-on-Derwent and Wharram-le-Street on the B1248 road. In 1931 the parish had a population of 143. On 1 April 1935 the parish was abolished and merged with Birdsall.

== History ==
The North Grimston sword, dating to the Iron Age, was found at North Grimston in 1902.

The name Grimston derives from the Old Norse personal name Grim or Grimr, and the Old English tūn meaning 'settlement'.

St Nicholas' Church, North Grimston is grade I listed and has a Norman font.

North Grimston was served by North Grimston railway station on the Malton and Driffield Railway between 1853 and 1950.

The village was historically part of the East Riding of Yorkshire until 1974. From 1974 to 2023 it was part of the district of Ryedale; it is now administered by the unitary North Yorkshire Council.
