= Burdale, North Yorkshire =

Hamlet in North Yorkshire, England

Coordinates: 54°3′N 0°40′W

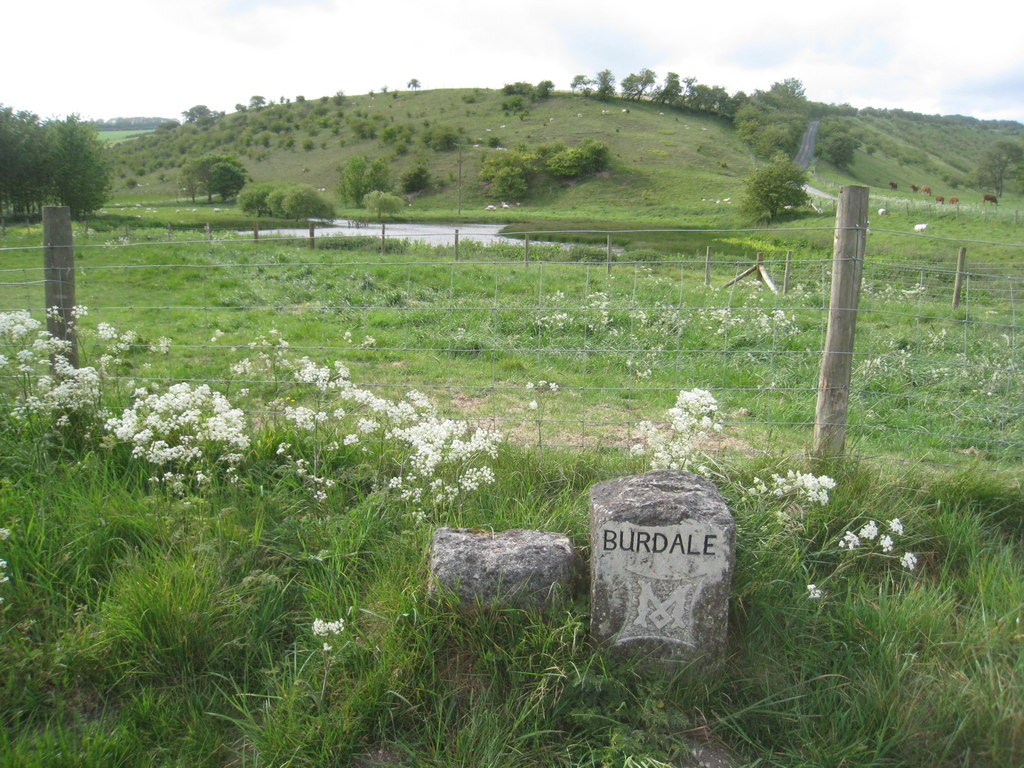
Signage

Burdale is a hamlet in North Yorkshire, England, 8 miles (13 km) south-east of Malton. It lies in a deep valley (or dale), also known as Burdale, in the Yorkshire Wolds. It is the site of a deserted medieval village.

Burdale was mentioned in the Domesday Book of 1086, when there were 43 villagers, a mill and two churches. In the 14th century Burdale appears to have been of a reasonable size, significantly larger than its more famous neighbour, Wharram Percy. By the 17th century the village was much reduced.

Between 1853 and 1950 Burdale had its own railway station, on the Malton and Driffield Junction Railway. Between 1925 and 1955 a large chalk quarry operated at Burdale, and supplied much of the traffic for the railway.

Burdale was part of the ancient parish of Wharram Percy in the East Riding of Yorkshire. It formed part of the township of Raisthorpe and Burdale, which became a civil parish in 1866. In 1872 the township became part of the new ecclesiastical parish of Thixendale when it was formed from the ecclesiastical parish of Wharram Percy. In 1935 the civil parish of Raisthorpe and Burdale was abolished and merged into the new parish of Wharram. In 1974 Burdale was transferred from the East Riding of Yorkshire to the new county of North Yorkshire as part of the Ryedale district. Ryedale was abolished in 2023 and the hamlet is now part of the area administered by North Yorkshire Council.
