= Fimber =

Village and civil parish in the East Riding of Yorkshire, England

Coordinates: 54°02′03″N 0°38′06″W

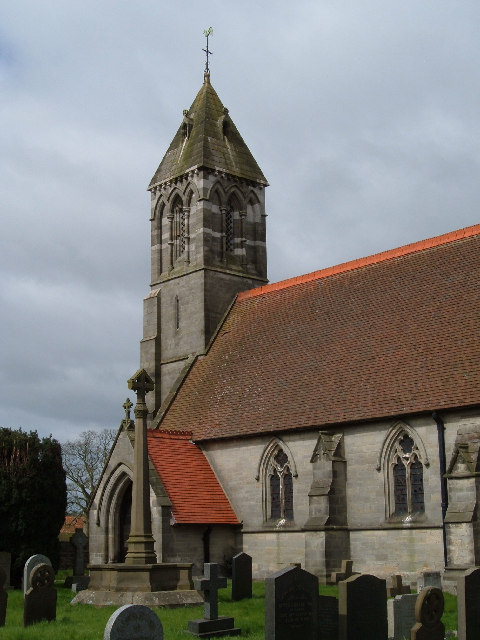
- St Mary’s Church, Fimber

- Location within the East Riding of Yorkshire
- Population: 91 (2001 census)
- OS grid reference: SE895606
  - London: 175 mi (282 km) S
- Civil parish: Fimber
- Unitary authority: East Riding of Yorkshire
- Ceremonial county: East Riding of Yorkshire
- Region: Yorkshire and the Humber
- Country: England
- Sovereign state: United Kingdom
- Post town: DRIFFIELD
- Postcode district: YO25
- Dialling code: 01377
- Police: Humberside
- Fire: Humberside
- Ambulance: Yorkshire
- UK Parliament: Bridlington and The Wolds

Fimber is a village and civil parish in the East Riding of Yorkshire, England. It is situated approximately 8 miles (13 km) north-west of Driffield town centre and 3 miles (5 km) south-west of the village of Sledmere. It lies on the B1248 road. The civil parish is formed by the village of Fimber and the hamlet of Towthorpe. According to the 2001 UK Census, Fimber parish had a population of 91.

The name Fimber probably derives from the Old English fīnmere meaning 'woodpile lake'. Alternatively, the first element could be derived from finn meaning 'coarse grass'.

St Mary's Church, Fimber was built in 1869–71 in a thirteenth-century style to replace a chapel of ease. The church was designated a Grade II listed building in September 1966 and is now recorded in the National Heritage List for England, maintained by Historic England. It is on the Sykes Churches Trail devised by the East Yorkshire Churches Group.

Fimber was served by Sledmere and Fimber railway station on the Malton and Driffield Railway between 1853 and 1950.

In 1823 the village was in the parish of Wetwang, the Wapentake of Buckrose, and the Liberty of St Peter. At the time there was a chapel of ease at which the rector of Wetwang was its incumbent curate. Population was 904, which included seven farmers, a grocer, a shoemaker, and a tailor.
