= Malton and Driffield Junction Railway =

Disused railway in Yorkshire, England

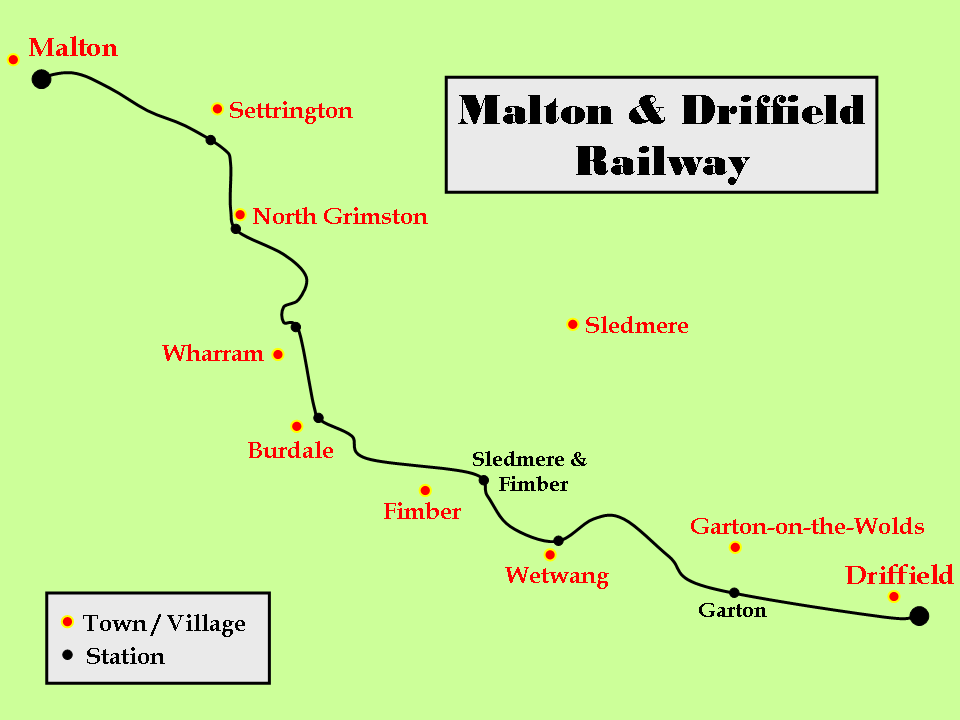
- The approximate route of the Malton and Driffield Junction Railway. The stations were often a considerable distance from the villages they served.

Overview
- Dates of operation: Opened: 1 June 1853–Closed to passenger: 5 June 1950; Closed to freight: 20 October 1958

Technical
- Track gauge: 4 ft 8 1/2 in (1,435 mm) standard gauge
- Length: 20 mi (32 km)

The Malton and Driffield Junction Railway, later known as the Malton and Driffield branch was a railway line in Yorkshire that ran between the towns of Malton, North Yorkshire and Driffield in the East Riding of Yorkshire.

The line was formally opened on 19 May 1853 with full public services starting on 1 June 1853. It became part of the North Eastern Railway (1854), then London and North Eastern Railway (1923), becoming part of British Railways in 1948. Passenger services on the line gained the nickname the Malton Dodger.

Between the 1920s and 1950s the line saw use transporting chalk from the Burdale and Wharram quarries. Passenger services ended on 5 June 1950; the Burdale quarry closed in 1955, and the line closed on 20 October 1958.

A short section of the original line reopened on 24 May 2015 as a heritage attraction operating as the Yorkshire Wolds Railway. There are plans to further extend the heritage railway.

== History ==
=== The Malton and Driffield Junction Railway (1846–1870) ===
Promotion of a line between Malton and Driffield dates to at least the mid-1840s when George Hudson subscribed £40,000 towards a Malton and Driffield Junction Company, which was intended to link to a proposed branch of the Great North of England Railway from Thirsk to Malton. (Note: The Hudson (York and North Midland) controlled Hull and Selby Railway (Bridlington branch) had opened in 1846, with a station at Driffield.) The Malton and Driffield Junction Railway was promoted as part of a line of communication from Hull to Newcastle-upon-Tyne and beyond to Scotland as well as opening up the agricultural districts of the East Riding of Yorkshire, and providing a short route to the new seaside resorts on the East Yorkshire coast. A connection via the proposed Thirsk and Malton Railway was required for the connections northward. (Note: 54.134263°N 0.779208°W, Scarborough Road Junction (Malton)) Both the Newcastle and Darlington Junction Railway (N&DJR) and York and North Midland Railways (Y&NMR) supported the scheme.

Malton and Driffield Junction Railway Act 1846
- Act of Parliament
- Parliament of the United Kingdom
- Long title: An Act for making a Railway from the Scarborough Branch of the York and North Midland Railway at Norton near Malton to the Bridlington Branch of the Hull and Selby Railway at Great Driffield, with a Branch therefrom.
- Citation: 9 & 10 Vict. c. lxxvii

Dates
- Royal assent: 26 June 1846

A previous scheme from Thirsk to Driffield, the Hull, Malton and Northern Union Railway was resurrected and promoted in opposition, but was unsuccessful. The Malton and Driffield Junction Railway Act 1846 (9 & 10 Vict. c. lxxvii), empowering the construction of a 24 miles (39 km) line was enacted in June 1846, allowing £240,000 to be raised for its development through shares, and a further £80,0000 through loans. (Note: Malton and Driffield Junction Railway Act, 1846 (Cap. 77); "An Act for making a Railway from the Scarborough Branch of the York and North Midland Railway at Norton near Malton to the Bridlington Branch of the Hull and Selby Railway at Great Driffield, with a Branch therefrom.": "Malton and Driffield Junction Railway". The London Gazette (20540): 5735–5736. 22 November 1845.)

Part of the rationale for the line was a connection to the Thirsk and Malton Railway, which the Newcastle and Darlington Junction had obtained the Newcastle and Darlington Junction Railway (Thirsk and Malton Branches) Act 1846 (9 & 10 Vict. c. lviii) for, but not built. A case was brought against that company's successor the York, Newcastle and Berwick Railway (YN&BR) to complete the line. As a result, a second act was obtained with the work completed 1853. The Malton and Driffield company subscribed £35,000 towards the scheme with the YN&BR contributing the other part. (Note: Malton and Driffield Junction Railway Act, 1852 (Cap. 37); "An act enabling the Malton and Driffield Junction Railway Company to subscribe towards the Construction of the Thirsk and Malton Branch of the York, Newcastle, and Berwick Railway, and to make Arrangements as to their Capital; and for other Purposes.": also : York, Newcastle, And Berwick Railway (Thirsk and Malton Branch) Act, 1852 (Cap. 36); "An act enabling the York, Newcastle, And Berwick Railway to make a Deviation in the Line of their Thirsk and Malton Branch; and to enable the Malton and Driffield Junction Railway Company to subscribe towards and enter in Agreements with respect to the said Branch; and for other Purposes."; in : The Sessional Papers of the House of Lords. Vol. 40. 1852. pp. 164, 182, 185.) In the same time period (1850s) the York and North Midland Railway held £40,000 worth of shares in the M&DJR. (Note: York and North Midland Railway Act, 1850 (Cap. 38); "An Act to alter the Terms of Issue of the Shares in the Capital of the York and North Midland Railway Company, called the "Hull and Selby Purchase, &c. Shares;" to enable the said Company to hold Shares in the Hull and Selby Railway Company and in the Malton and Driffield Junction Railway Company; to alter, amend, and extend the Acts relating to the York and North Midland Railway Company; and for other Purposes.")

==== Construction ====
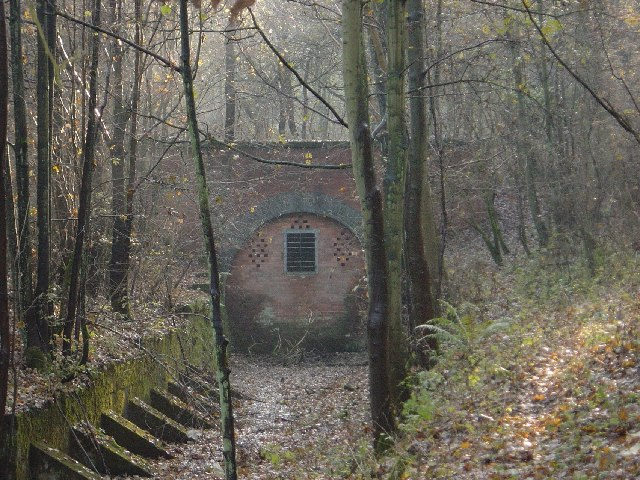
North portal of Burdale Tunnel in November 2005 (Note: 54.056395°N 0.672095°W, Burdale Tunnel (south))

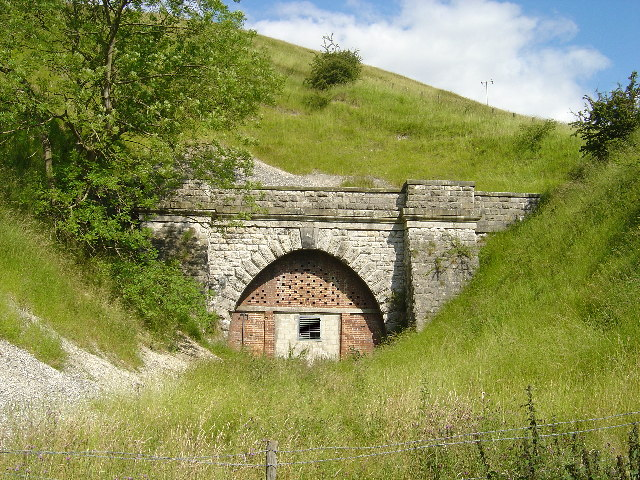
South portal of Burdale Tunnel in July 2005 (Note: 54.068006°N 0.686057°W, Burdale Tunnel (north))

The engineer was John Cass Birkinshaw, the assistant engineer Alfred Lamert Dickens. In addition to the main line from New Malton (on the York and Scarborough Railway (Note: 54.133862°N 0.784576°W, Junction with the York and Scarborough Railway)) to Great Driffield (on the Hull and Selby Bridlington branch (Note: 54.000018°N 0.436353°W, Junction with the Hull and Selby (Bridlington branch))) the plans included a 5 miles 4.5 chains (5.06 miles, 8.14 km) branch from Frodingham Bridge on the River Hull. On the original plan the minimum curve was 20 chains (1,300 ft; 400 m) with maximum gradients of 1 in 60, and 1 in 158. The line also included a tunnel of 1,694 yards (1,549 m).

The first seven miles (11 km) of the line from Malton included severe gradients, ascending, including 2.5 miles (4 km) at 1 in 70, and required heavy civil engineering works. The highest point of the line was within the tunnel, where the southbound gradient changed from 1 in 70 up to 1 in 85 down. As built the line included a number of timber bridges, and a timber viaduct at Wharram. Land had been acquired for a double track line but only a single track was laid, using 65 pounds per yard (32.2 kg/m) weight rails, on cross sleepered track. The line was to be worked by the York, Newcastle and Berwick Railway, under the same rules as the Thirsk and Malton Line.

Work on the line began in 1847, and by 1849 over £100,000 had been expended on the construction of the line, the majority on works (£52,921) and permanent way (£31,597). The bursting of the speculative bubble of the Railway Mania in the late 1840s adversely affected the line's prospects. By early 1849 the company's calls on shares were in arrears.

Malton and Driffield Junction Railway Amendment Act 1851
- Act of Parliament
- Parliament of the United Kingdom
- Long title: An Act to authorize certain Alterations in the Line and Levels of the Malton and Driffield Junction Railway, and to amend the Act[l] relating thereto.
- Citation: 14 & 15 Vict. c. xxxix

Dates
- Royal assent: 5 June 1851

Text of statute as originally enacted

Financial problems caused the company to abandon the construction of a double track line and only construct a single line. In 1850 the company applied to Parliament to alter the path of the line; the Malton and Driffield Junction Railway Amendment Act 1851 (14 & 15 Vict. c. xxxix) was passed the next year. (Note: Malton and Driffield Junction Railway Amendment, 1851 (Cap. 39); "An Act to authorize certain Alterations in the Line and Levels of the Malton and Driffield Junction Railway, and to amend the Act relating thereto.")

By 1851 about half (10 miles or 16 kilometres) of the line had been completed as a single line; the 5-mile (8 km) branch was by then in abeyance. In early 1852 the calls on shares were still in arrears requiring the company to funds by loans. An estimated £65,000 was required for the completion of the line; £40,000 had been borrowed by late January 1852; over £55,000 by mid 1852.

Agreement was reached with the Y&NMR to pay a fee to use the station and track into Driffield. The 19-mile (31 km) was opened formally 19 May 1853, becoming open to public traffic on 1 June. The line had stations at Settrington, (Note: 54.115336°N 0.722284°W, Settrington station) North Grimston, (Note: 54.097908°N 0.717774°W, North Grimston station) Wharram, (Note: 54.076930°N 0.689380°W, Wharram station) Burdale, (Note: 54.050638°N 0.669800°W, Burdale station) Fimber, (Note: 54.037420°N 0.612745°W, Fimber station) (Note: Opened as Fimber Road in May 1853, renamed Sledmere in March 1858 and became Sledmere & Fimber in May 1859. The station closed in June 1950.) Wetwang, (Note: 54.024413°N 0.576540°W, Wetwang station) and Garton; (Note: 54.008269°N 0.505371°W, Garton station) Malton station and Driffield station were used as termini. (Note: 54.131919°N 0.797284°W, Malton station) (Note: 54.00142°N 0.43453°W, Driffield station)

==== Operations ====
In the beginning three passenger trains ran in each direction Mondays to Saturdays, calling at all stations, with two on Sundays. By the end of the 19th century the Sunday service had ceased, but the line reached its high water mark with four trains each way each weekday. Thereafter the line ran a notably consistent three trains in each direction calling at all stations, Mondays to Saturdays, until the service was withdrawn in 1953. Some of the services had two coaches, others one, though it was far from rare to add one or more horseboxes in what was and remains racing country. Loadings were good on Saturdays (Market Days) but schoolchildren were the mainstay during the week.

By 1926 two pick-up goods trains ran daily, in opposite directions, with crews swapping trains mid-journey. These were at times very well loaded, but the traffic only declined in the face of road competition. By the end there were only two pick-up goods per week, both poorly loaded. In the words of The Railway Magazine "Two trains a day might have maintained the railway link ... two a week would not."

The line was conceived as part of a through line between Hull and the north east of England. The only hint of such services came with the Summer Saturday Scarborough to Newcastle and Glasgow holiday trains. Running from Scarborough they halted at Malton, attached a pilot engine at the rear, reversed up onto Malton and Driffield metals at Scarborough Road Junction where the pilot was uncoupled. This locomotive then acted as a banker to get the long train moving forwards once again towards Gilling, Pillmoor and the East Coast Main Line. These trains used a rich variety of motive power, with even LNER Class A4 4-6-2s on occasions, but most commonly LNER Class V2 2-6-2s. In summer 1950 at least the line was used for a Summer Saturday Filey to Newcastle train and return, which travelled via Driffield, Wharram and Gilling, joining the East Coast Main Line at Pilmoor Junction. The other service to use the Malton, Scarborough Road Junction then reverse route was the two trains six times per year beginning and end of term specials, one from King's Cross and the other from Liverpool, to Ampleforth College. This lasted until 28 April 1964.

The closest freight traffic to the original concept was chalk from quarries at Burdale and Wharram bound for steelworks on Teesside. This underwent spectacular boom and bust in the 1920s, petering out in the 1950s, which spelled the line's death-knell.

As for through Hull-Tyneside trains, the junction at Driffield tells its own story – it was facing the "wrong way". No source talks of through traffic, even in wartime. The closest thing to through traffic were scenic excursions which used the line as a scenic part of a scenic route or in some cases toured the line's stations' floral displays. Often such trains' locomotives traversed the line tender-first because the trains arrived the "wrong way" from Hull or Doncaster and would resume travelling the "right way" after a second reverse at Malton. Furthermore, no source comments on how it could be that conscientious staff could find the time to keep beautiful gardens.

Two very occasional traffics added to the line's diminishing income: special trains for royalty and enthusiasts, both of which gathered publicity beyond their revenue. The latter were a phenomenon of the 1950s, with the best recorded running along the line (and others) on 2 June 1957 and 23 June 1957. The King and Queen arrived at Sledmere and Fimber by train on 6 July 1948. As with the summer Scarborough to Tyneside trains mentioned above, other royal trains touched the north end of the line when making double-reverses to get to events in Ryedale.

==== Amalgamation ====
In the early 1850s the Leeds Northern Railway (LNR), the York, Newcastle and Berwick Railway (YN&BR) and the York and North Midland Railway (Y&NMR) were considering amalgamation, and in 1853 the M&DJR was admitted to that group of companies; and became part of joint traffic agreements. The North-eastern Railway Company's Act 1854 (17 & 18 Vict. c. ccxi) allowing the YN&BR, LNR and Y&NMR companies to amalgamate into a new "North Eastern Railway" (NER) was passed; the association of M&DJR was formally announced at the first meeting of the NER, where, the distribution of income was decided to be based on traffic receipts over the next five years; the M&DJR obtained one director of a board of seventeen, and the company ceased to exist as an independent entity from 1 September 1854. (Note: Tomlinson (1915, pp. 640–641) : Stock consolidation took place in 1870.) In 1863 agreements relating to the merger of the Stockton and Darlington Railway (S&DR) set the Malton section's share of the combined company's profits at 0.29%, a sum which was not sufficient to meet running costs; the company attempted to renegotiate requesting a share of gross revenue, but were denied.

Difficulties and disappointments arising from line were recalled in a scathing article in the Railway News, written on the eve of the consolidation or NER shares:

The line was a gross mistake throughout – but was conceived in times when [...] high sounding notions of a "grand connecting link" in the "Hull and Glasgow Direct" were uppermost. [...] The hapless Malton and Driffield has never paid its interest on borrowed capital, is now £50,000 in debt, and is destined, we are told, to total annihilation.

— Railway News (6 November 1869)

=== History 1870–1958 ===
In 1890 a line from Market Weighton was opened, promoted as the Scarborough, Bridlington and West Riding Junction Railway, authorised by the Scarborough, Bridlington and West Riding Junction Railways Act 1885 (48 & 49 Vict. c. clxxxi), and worked by the NER. The line made a junction with the M&DJR at Driffield (Driffield Junction West) just west of the M&DJR's junction with the Hull to Bridlington Line. (Note: 53.998013°N 0.442286°W, Junction with the Driffield and Market Weighton line (1890))

As a result of the Railways Act 1921, in 1923 the line became part of the London and North Eastern Railway (LNER). In 1948 after nationalisation of the railway as a result of the Transport Act 1947 the line became part of the North Eastern Region of British Railways.

In the 1920s the line was used to transport lime (chalk) from the quarry at Wharram (open 1918–1930) to the iron and steel industry on Teesside; the line handled around 100,000 tons per year.

In 1922 a quarry opened and Burdale for the same purpose which provided work for the line until the quarry's closure in 1955.

The route was closed to passenger traffic on 5 June 1950 but remained open for goods. It reopened to passengers from 12 to 16 February 1953 and again in February 1958 when roads were impassable due to snow.

The line closed completely on 20 October 1958 and was lifted by 1961 except for a short stretch near Scarborough Road Junction to allow trains to access the Malton to Thirsk line.

=== Legacy ===
As of 2006 the track bed remains in evidence as field boundaries, earthworks, and undeveloped ground. Short sections have been reused as footpaths (e.g. near Wharram Percy). At Malton the former line of the railway influences modern street plans such as the rear boundary to Parliament Avenue. A fraction of the former line has been completely developed over such as at the housing development around Bracken Road in Driffield.

As of 2005 the station buildings survive except at Sledmere and Fimber, and Burdale station. Other extant structures include a crossing keepers cottage at Sledmere, and a brick water tower with iron water tank at Wharram. Rail related buildings exist at the former quarry at Wharram. The Burdale Tunnel portals were bricked up after closure and the interior experienced collapses in the 1970s and 1980s.

== Accidents ==
On 15 September 1948 a passenger train consisting of a tank engine and two coaches travelling 30 miles per hour (48 km/h) collided at an accommodation crossing with a Ford lorry carrying Poles and Hungarians going to work on a farm. As a result of the lorry running into the path of the train, three of the lorry passengers were killed and six others seriously injured, including the British driver. The train had minimal damage. The inquest recorded that the accident was caused by lack of caution by the lorry driver, noted that the view at the crossing point was very poor, and that the driver may not have heard the train's whistle over the noise of the lorry engine.

== Locomotives and rolling stock ==
Based on written records and photographic evidence, the following locomotive types are known to have been used on the MDR in the indicated timeframes.

=== Goods locomotives ===
==== Pre-grouping (before 1923) ====
Class (Designer)	Former Class	Wheel Arrangement	Representative Image	Examples Seen (Date)
NER Class 1001 (Bouch)	S&DR	0-6-0		Not confirmed but No. 1275 was allocated to Malton until 1923

==== Pre-nationalisation (1923–1947) ====
Class (Designer)	Former Class	Wheel Arrangement	Representative Image	Examples Seen (Date)
LNER Class A7 (Raven)	NER Class Y	4-6-2}T		(before 1939)
LNER Class F4 (T.W. Worsdell)	GER Class M15	2-4-2T		7578 (after 1945)
LNER Class J3 (Gresley)	GNR Class J4	0-6-0		339 (during the Second World War); 4035 (during the Second World War)
LNER Class J25 (W. Worsdell)	NER Class P1	0-6-0		5656 crashed at Settrington (1947)
LNER Class J36 (Holmes)	NBR Class C	0-6-0		9604 (during the Second World War); 9172 (during the Second World War)
LNER Class J75 (M. Stirling)	H&BR Class G3	0-6-0T		(before 1939)
LNER Class Q5 (W. Worsdell)	NER Classes T and T1	0-8-0		(before 1939)
WD Austerity 2-8-0 (Riddles)	-	2-8-0		(during the Second World War)

==== Post-nationalisation (1948–18 October 1958) ====
Class (Designer)	Former Class	Wheel Arrangement	Representative Image	Examples Seen (Date)
BR Class A8 (Gresley)	LNER Class A8	4-6-2T		69861 at Wharram (1958) [Last train: Malton-Sledmere]
BR Class J27 (W. Worsdell)	NER Class P3	0-6-0		65844 at Settrington (c. 1950); 65849 at Fimber (1956)
BR Class J39 (Gresley)	LNER Class J39	0-6-0		64928 at Wetwang (1958); 64938 at Settrington (1956)
BR Class 2MT (Ivatt)	LMS Class 2	2-6-0		46481 (1958) [Last through goods train]

=== Passenger locomotives ===
==== Pre-grouping (before 1923) ====
Class (Designer)	Former Class	Wheel Arrangement	Representative Image	Examples Seen (Date)
NER Fletcher 0-4-4T of unknown yype (Note: Probably Fletcher 0-4-4T Bogie Tank Passenger (BTP) engines. According to (Jenkins, 2002), these were numerous and widely employed throughout the NER system.) (Fletcher)		0-4-4T		
NER Class A (T. W. Worsdell)	later LNER Class F8	2-4-2T		No. 1581 on one coach Dodger at Driffield
NER Class O (W. Worsdell)	later LNER Class G5	0-4-4T		
NER Class W (W. Worsdell)	later LNER Class A6	4-6-2T		
NER Class B1 (T. W. Worsdell)	later LNER Class N8	0-6-2T		Two coach Dodger at Driffield
NER Class Z (Raven)	later LNER Class C7	4-4-2		No. 737 on floral display special at Wharram

==== Pre-nationalisation (1923–1947) ====
Class (Designer)	Former Class	Wheel Arrangement	Representative Image	Examples Seen (Date)
LNER Class C1 (T. W. Worsdell)	NER Class C	0-6-0		Double-headed train (Winter 1947)

==== Post-nationalisation (1948–3 June 1950) ====
Class (Designer)	Former Class	Wheel Arrangement	Representative Image	Examples Seen (Date)
BR Class G5 (W. Worsdell)	LNER Class G5; NER Class O	0-4-4T		67330 at Driffield (1949); 67293 at Driffield (1950) [Final passenger train]
BR Class 4MT (Fowler)	LMS Class 4P	2-6-4T		42324 at Burdale Tunnel

==== Post-nationalisation (1948–1958) ====
Class (Designer)	Former Class	Wheel Arrangement	Representative Image	Examples Seen (Date)
BR Class A2 (Peppercorn)	LNER Class A2	4-6-2		60534 'Irish Elegance' at Sledmere (1948) [ Royal Train ]
BR Class B1 (Thompson)	LNER Class B1 "Antelope" Class	4-6-0		61010 'Wildebeeste' at North Grimston (1948)
BR Class D20/1 (W.Worsdell)	NER Class R	4-4-0		62387 at North Grimston (1957) [Branch Line Soc Tour]
BR Class D49 (Gresley)	LNER Class D49 "Shire" Class	4-4-0		62731 'Selkirkshire' at Wharram (1957) [ RCTS Special ]

== Heritage operation ==
The Yorkshire Wolds Railway operate on a section of the Malton and Driffield Junction Railway near the village of Fimber. The project has a short demonstration line and an operational industrial diesel locomotive which provides brake van rides to visitors. The railway has ambitious plans for expansion, work on which is currently underway.

== Gallery ==
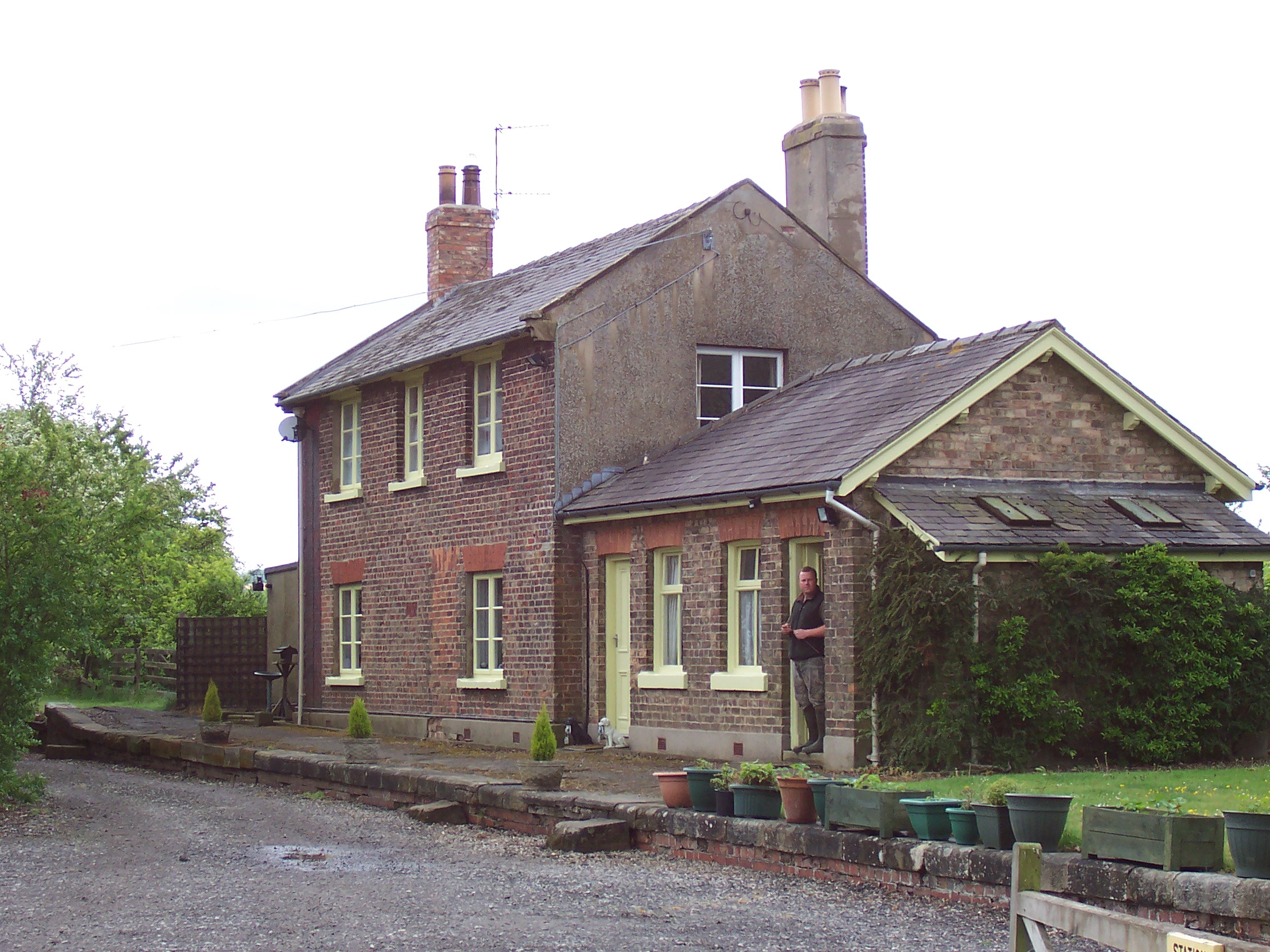
Settrington station in May 2007

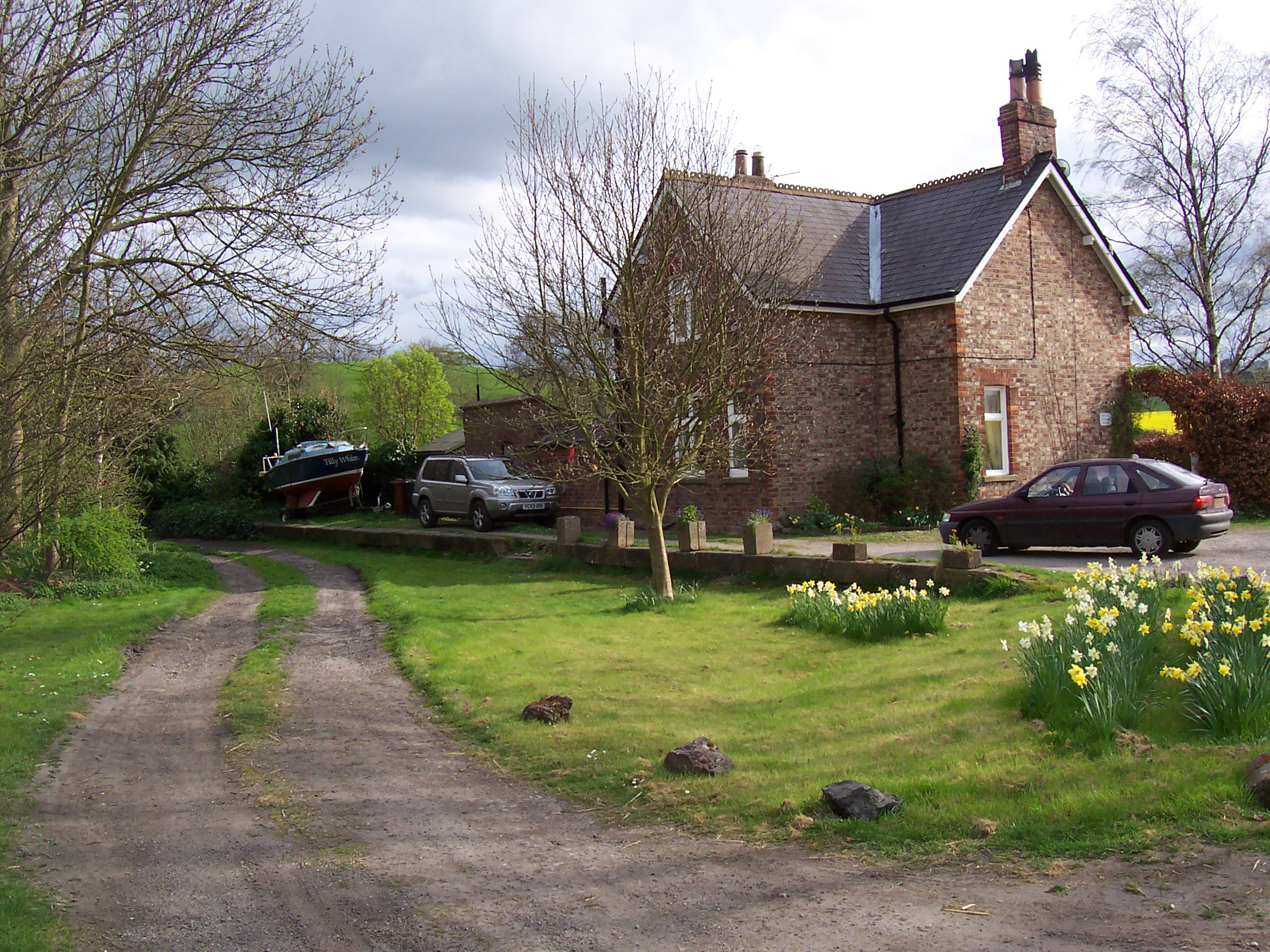
North Grimston station in April 2007

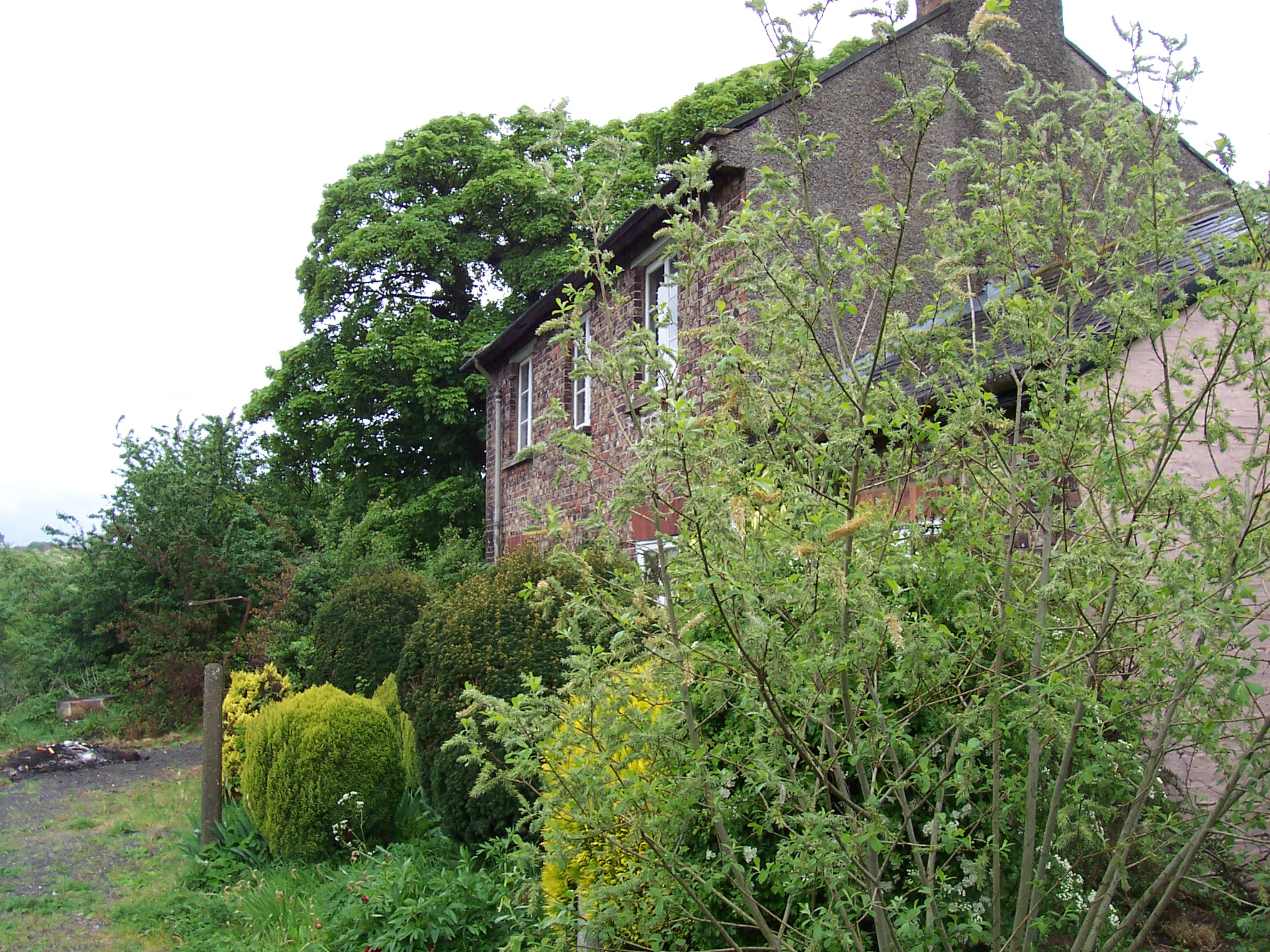
Wharram station in May 2007

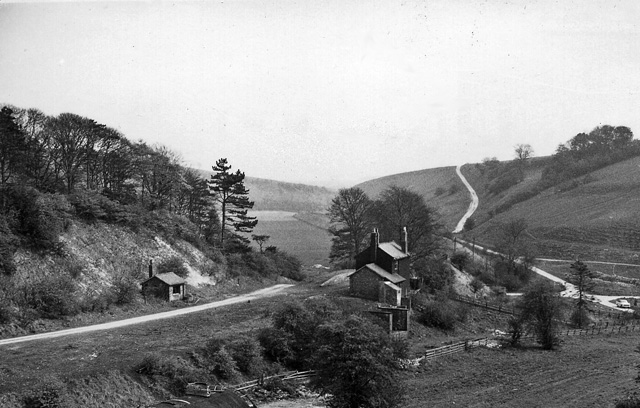
Burdale station in April 1961

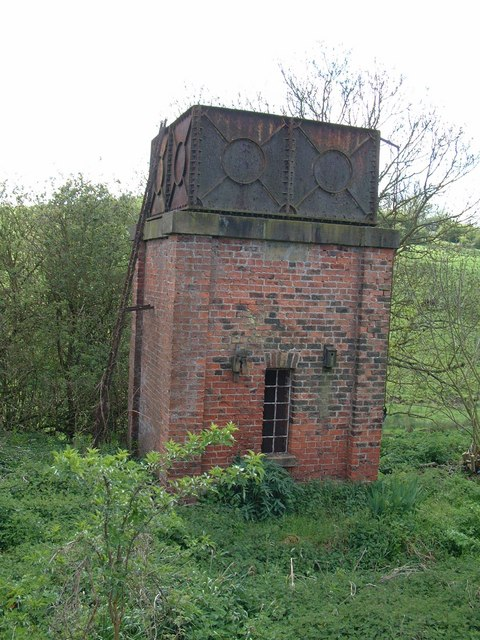
Water tower at Wharram in May 2004

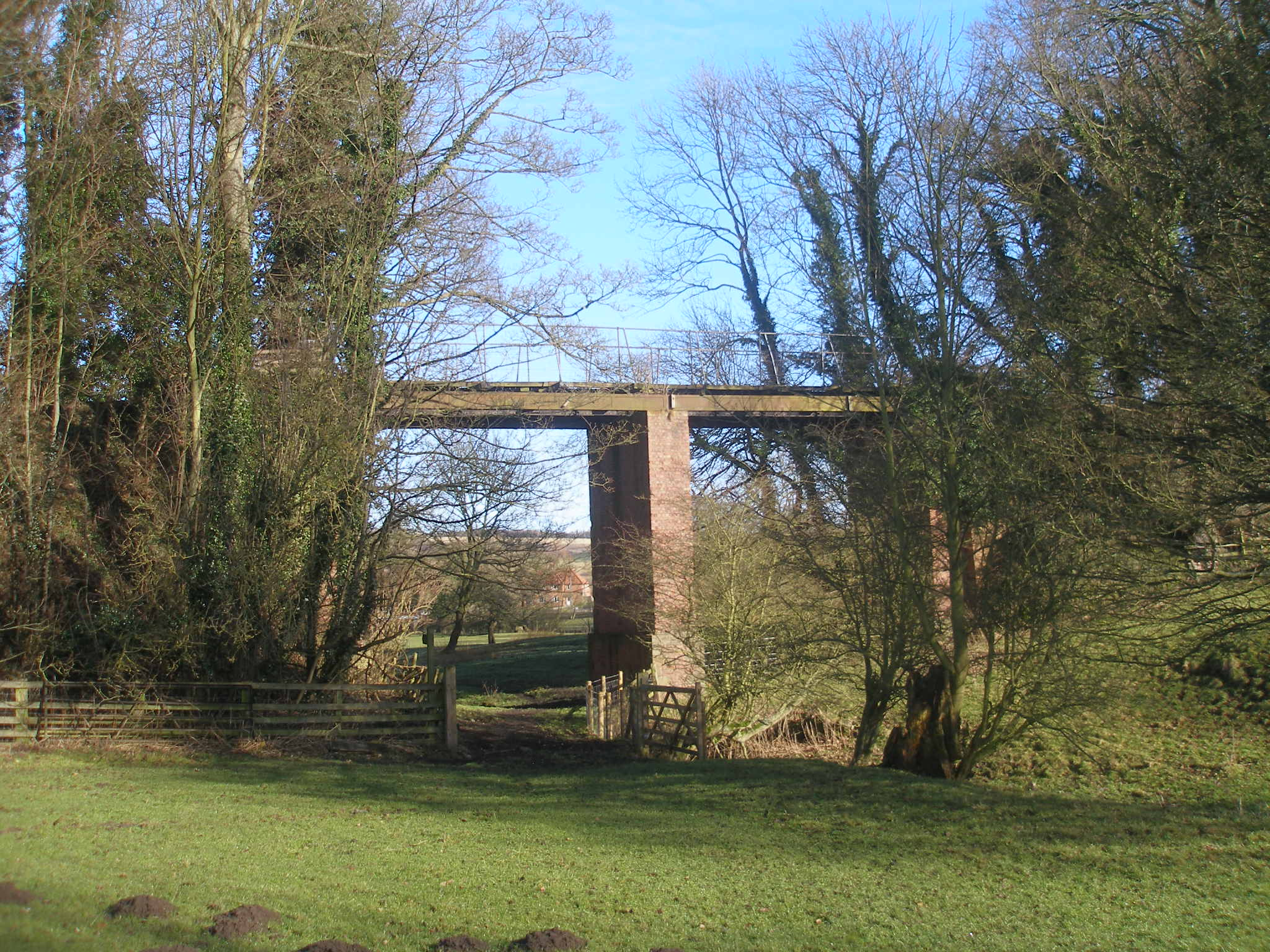
Bridge near North Grimston in February 2013

== Further material ==
- Hitches, Mike (2012). Steam Around York & the East Riding. Stroud: Amberley Publishing. ISBN 978-1-84868-444-7.
- Hitches, Mike (2009). Steam Around Scarborough. Stroud: Amberley Publishing. ISBN 978-1-84868-503-1.
