= Wharram Percy =

Deserted medieval village in North Yorkshire, England

Coordinates: 54°04′03″N 00°41′23″W

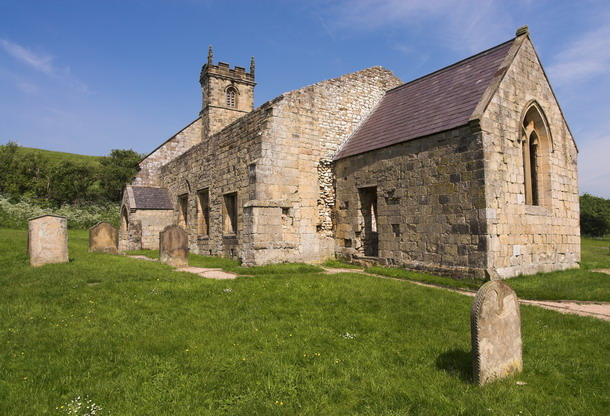
- Ruin of St Martin's parish church

- Location within North Yorkshire
- OS grid reference: SE 857 643
- Civil parish: Wharram
- Unitary authority: North Yorkshire
- Ceremonial county: North Yorkshire
- Region: Yorkshire and the Humber
- Country: England
- Sovereign state: United Kingdom

Wharram Percy is a deserted medieval village and former civil parish near Wharram-le-Street, now in the parish of Wharram, on the western edge of the chalk Wolds of North Yorkshire, England. Although the site seems to have been settled since prehistory, the village appears to have been most active from the 10th to the 12th centuries.

It is about 1 mile (1.6 km) south of Wharram-le-Street and is signposted from the Beverley to Malton road (B1248). In 1931 the parish had a population of 40.

It was part of the East Riding of Yorkshire until 1974. From 1974 to 2023 it was part of the district of Ryedale, it is now administered by the unitary North Yorkshire Council.

The earthworks of the village have been known for many years, and outlines of house platforms were drawn onto the first Ordnance Survey six-inch maps of Yorkshire published in 1854. The site was researched each summer by combined teams of archaeologists, historians and even botanists, from about 1950 to 1990 after it was singled out for study in 1948 by Professor Maurice Beresford of the University of Leeds.

The site is now in the care of Historic England (formerly English Heritage).

== Etymology ==
The name Wharram possibly derives from the plural form of either the Old English hwer meaning 'cauldron', or the Old Norse hvarf meaning 'bend'. The Domesday Book of 1086 records it as 'Warran' or 'Warron'. The suffix 'Percy' stems from the prominent, aristocratic family that owned the area during the Middle Ages, and is referenced as such as early as 1292.

== History ==
=== Founding ===
In around 50 BCE, several Late Iron Age farm enclosures were established along a track that ran east–west across the valley. The Romans then developed one of these enclosures into a larger farmstead around the 3rd century, which survived for about 200 years, and were then seemingly completely deserted. However, two Anglo-Saxon buildings from around the 6th or 7th century have been found along one of the trackways.

The exact origins of the village are debated; a 2002 geophysical survey revealed several ditches which, when excavated, yielded material from the Middle Saxon period and evidence of a few buildings. While some have used this to state that the proto-village emerged during the mid 7th century, other argue that the buildings found within the ditches were in fact temporary huts erected by shepherds who drove their flocks into the area to graze during Summer and Autumn. Proponents of this theory suggest the ditches were sheepfolds connected to an annual market/fair around the 11 November, the feast day of St. Martin (to whom the church would later be dedicated).

Between 850 and 950, a major reorganisation and revolution of land use and parish boundaries led to the first basic components of the village being established, the remains of which are visible today. During this process, the earlier settlements were ploughed over. Whether this was directed by a landowner or the local community is unclear.

=== Early Village Development ===
The Domesday Book of 1086 lists two main landowners, Lagmann and Carli, as well as a man who owned a smaller portion, Ketilbjorn. These men may have been responsible for rebuilding St. Martin's church shortly before the Norman Conquest. After the Harrying of the North, the village's lands were seized by William I and granted to the Sheriff of York and Lincoln, Osbert, and possibly William de Percy, who's descendants would go on to be the Percys of Northumberland in the Medieval period. The later lords of Wharram could possibly be descended from William de Percy himself, or also possibly from an important tenant who took the name from his lord. By around 1176, there were two main power players in the village, William Percy, and Herbert Chamberlain: both or either of whom may be responsible for the developments of the village around this time.

=== Village Golden Era ===
In 1254, Henry Chamberlain sold his remaining rights in the village to Peter Percy, making them the sole-controlling force in the village. Under the Percys, the village prospered, evidenced by alterations made to the North Manor, and the addition of a 3.25 hectare hunting park.

=== Decline ===
After a period of stability and growth, a series of tragedies afflicted the village around the 14th century. 1315 saw the death of the local lord, Robert III's son, Peter. He left no male heir, just his daughter Eustachia and her mother Isabel. In 1321, Robert himself died at the age of 76, followed quickly by his last surviving son, Henry. The following year, the Scots raided the village. A 1323 valuation found 2/3 of village land uncultivated, several plots unoccupied, and the two water mills disused. By 1334, the village ranked 33rd of 50 local villages from a tax assessment, the village valued at just at 18 shillings. The Black Death killed Eustachia's husband, Walter Heslerton. Their son, Walter, could not inherit since he was a minor, and Eustachia was declared mentally unfit and placed under the Crown's protection, leaving the Crown with the ability to manage the lands for its gain.

Eustachia died in 1366, leaving her son to inherit the lands. However, he died just a year later, leaving the estate to Henry Percy, of the 'more illustrious' family, which ended the family's direct involvement in village affairs. By this time, the village's fortunes were far better than they had been in the earlier half of the century. This is the situation the village was in when the Peasant's Revolt kicked off in 1381, which received a lot of support in Yorkshire, and a tax return suggests that more than half of Wharram Percy's population had avoided paying the poll tax.

Somewhere between 1394 and 1402, the Percy family exchanged their holdings in the area with the Hylton family, however, they may never have moved to Wharram Percy, and certainly did not reside there after 1406. Following changes in prices and wages during the 15th century, pastoral farming (particularly sheep) was more profitable for landowners than cereal farming. Over the century following, the Hylton family devoted more and more land to sheep, as their employment of agricultural labour decreased and farmers were possibly evicted without record. During the early 16th century, the last residents of Wharram Percy were evicted and their homes were demolished to make room for more sheep pasture. In 1573, Sir William Percy sold Wharram Percy to Matthew Hutton, then dean, later archbishop, of York.

Wharram Percy's final plot of continuously inhabited land, recorded as the 'chief messuage', operated a mixed agricultural regime on the land and generally kept up the area until the Huttons sold the land to Sir John Buck of Filey in 1634, with the references to the 'chief messuage' ending just two years later. Except for a brief period of confiscation during the Civil War, the land of Wharram Percy stayed with the Buck family until it was bought by Henry Willoughby, 6th Baron Middleton, in 1833, At this time the land of Wharram Percy was entirely occupied by a farm. This existed until Willoughby's heir, Digby, demolished the farmhouse and constructed a row of cottages instead.

Wharram Percy was an ancient parish, which continued long after the depopulation of the village. The parish also included the townships of Burdale, Raisthorpe, Thixendale and Towthorpe. In 1866 Thixendale, Towthorpe and Raisthorpe and Burdale became separate civil parishes. On 1 April 1935 the civil parish of Wharram Percy was abolished and merged with Raisthorpe and Burdale and Wharram le Street to form Wharram.

Interest in abandoned villages was sparked again in the early 20th century, which led to Maurice Beresford visiting Wharram Percy on 26 June 1948, and J K St Joseph taking aerial photographs of the site. Excavations began in the Summer of 1950, with archaeologist John Hurst joining in 1952. Excavations took places every Summer until 1990, Wharram Percy becoming a site to test new techniques and train aspiring archaeologists.

English Heritage has cared for the site since 1974, however, the land still belongs to Lord Middleton of Birdsall.

== Present site ==
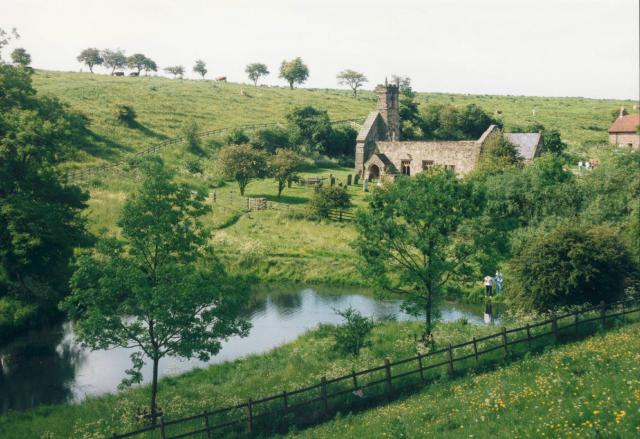
View north across the fish pond to the deserted village

The site is now in the care of Historic England. Although only the ruined church is easily visible above ground, much more of the village layout can be seen in the surrounding fields.

In 2002 English Heritage (now called Historic England) undertook an archaeological investigation and analytical field survey of Wharram Percy. A 2004 study of a sizeable collection of human skeletal remains, excavated from the churchyard of the deserted village, reveals details of disease, diet and death in the rural medieval community. This used the latest scientific techniques to make observations about childhood growth, duration of breastfeeding, and osteoporosis and tuberculosis.

The Yorkshire Wolds Way National Trail passes through the site, and the Centenary Way long-distance footpath passes to the east of the village.

== St Martin's Church ==
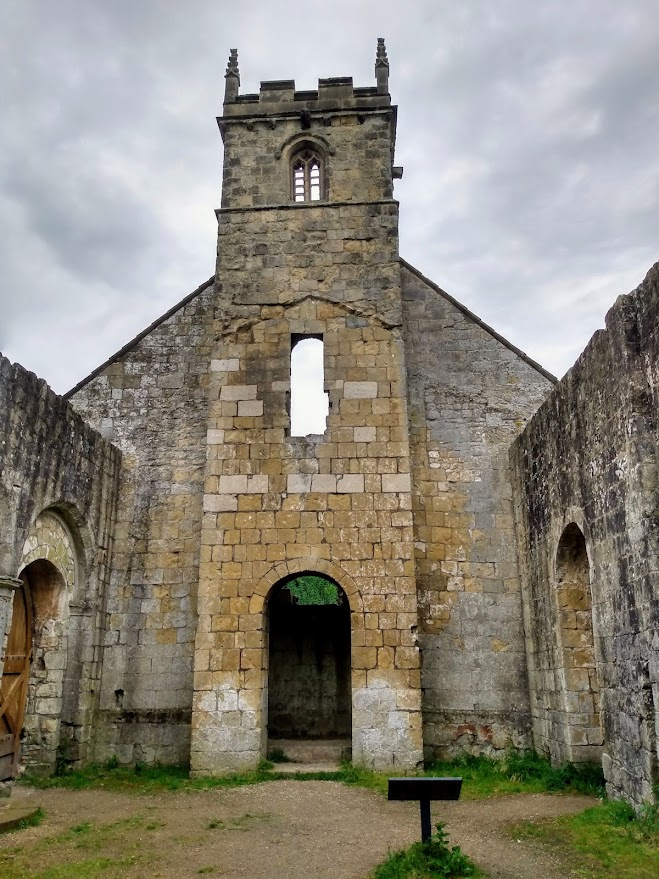
The church interior, looking towards the tower

St Martin's Church has evolved through six phases between the early 12th and early 17th centuries. The tower collapsed in 1959 and thereafter the interior was excavated, revealing a smaller, mid-11th-century stone church and an earlier, mid- to late 10th-century, timber building.

== See also ==
- Listed buildings in Wharram
