= Minster Way =

50-mile walking route in northern England

- Length: 50 mi (80 km)
- Location: North Yorkshire & East Riding of Yorkshire, England
- Trailheads: Beverley Minster, 53°50′21.23″N 0°25′28.48″W; York Minster, 53°57′44.45″N 1°4′55.50″W
- Use: Hiking
- Highest point: 627 ft (191 m)
- Lowest point: 30 ft (9.1 m)
- Difficulty: Challenging
- Sights: Beverley Minster;York Minster
- Hazards: Road crossings; Steep ascents and descents

The Minster Way is a 50-mile (80 km) walking route between the Minsters of Beverley and York in England. It crosses the chalk hills of the Yorkshire Wolds, as well as a wide variety of the East Riding of Yorkshire countryside. Part of the route follows the Yorkshire Wolds Way National Trail across Sylvan Dale before diverting to Millington, Bishop Wilton and Stamford Bridge, where it follows the River Derwent into the Plain of York as far as the River Ouse.

The Minster Way links to other paths, namely the Beverley Twenty; Blackpool to Bridlington (Aerospace Way); Chalkland Way; East Riding Heritage Way; Jorvic Way; Trans Pennine Trail; Wilberforce Way and the Yorkshire Wolds Way National Trail.

== History ==
It was established in 1980 by Ray Wallis of the East Yorkshire Area of The Ramblers. The route is waymarked by white symbols depicting a view of an ecclesiastical building representing the two minsters and the words Minster Way. A badge was created by the founder of the walk for hikers to display as proof of completion of the walk. It is similar to the waymarks, except the picture and words are in yellow on a red background.

== Settlements on walk ==
The route passes through the following towns and villages in order from the start point:

- Beverley
- Scorborough
- Lockington
- Kilnwick
- Bracken on the Wolds
- Bainton
- North Dalton
- Millington
- Great Givendale
- Bishop Wilton
- Stamford Bridge
- York

== Route ==
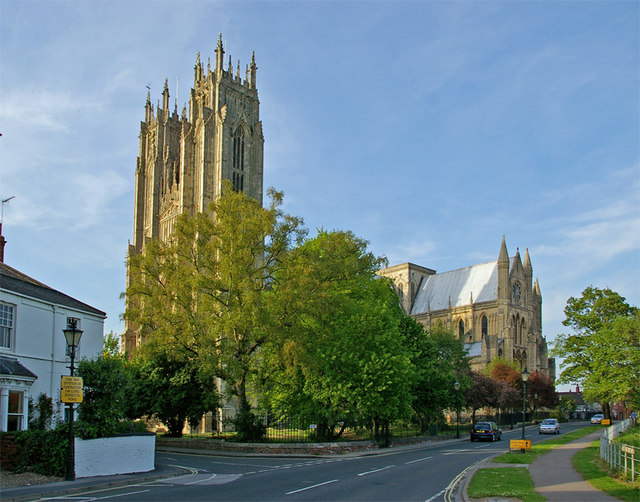
Beverley Minster

=== Beverley to Lockington ===
The walk starts at Beverley Minster and heads north through the town and crosses the A164, Hessle to Driffield road, and the A1035 before entering open countryside. It heads towards Molescroft Carr Farm before it heads north over Black Hill to Leconfield Low Parks and the edge of Leconfield Airfield. The walk follows the Hull to Scarborough railway line and the Catchwater Drain on the left towards New Arram. The walk continues north and crosses a level crossing and follows the railway to the next level crossing where it crosses back again. The way heads west along the road to Scorborough and the A164 the path turns north-west to Snowclose Plantation before passing Hall Garth and entering Lockington.

=== Lockington to North Dalton ===
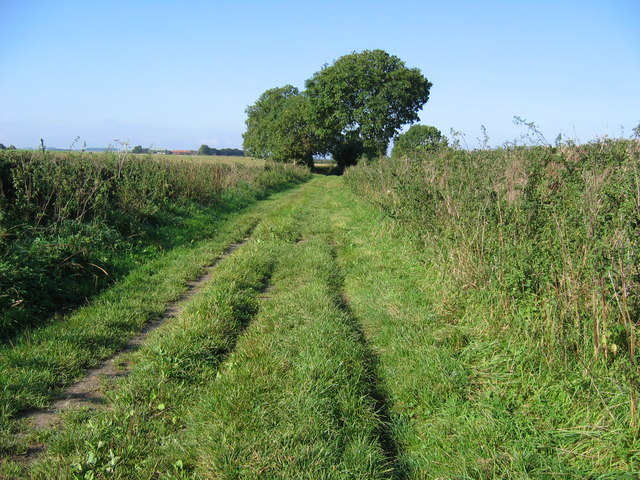
Minster Way near Bainton

The walk heads north on the main road past the Post Office and turns towards Kilnwick. After leaving the village, the path curves to the west passes the west side of a small lake called Cawkeld Sinks before running along the northern end of Wedding Wood and passing Kilnwick New Farm and Bracken Cottages. The path leaves the road heading north over farmland through Bracken before heading west along Oldfield Lane, a green lane, and finally turns north along the B1248 and into Bainton. In the village the route heads west out of Bainton along West End and over open farmland, past Westfield Farm, to North Dalton.

=== North Dalton to Bishop Wilton ===
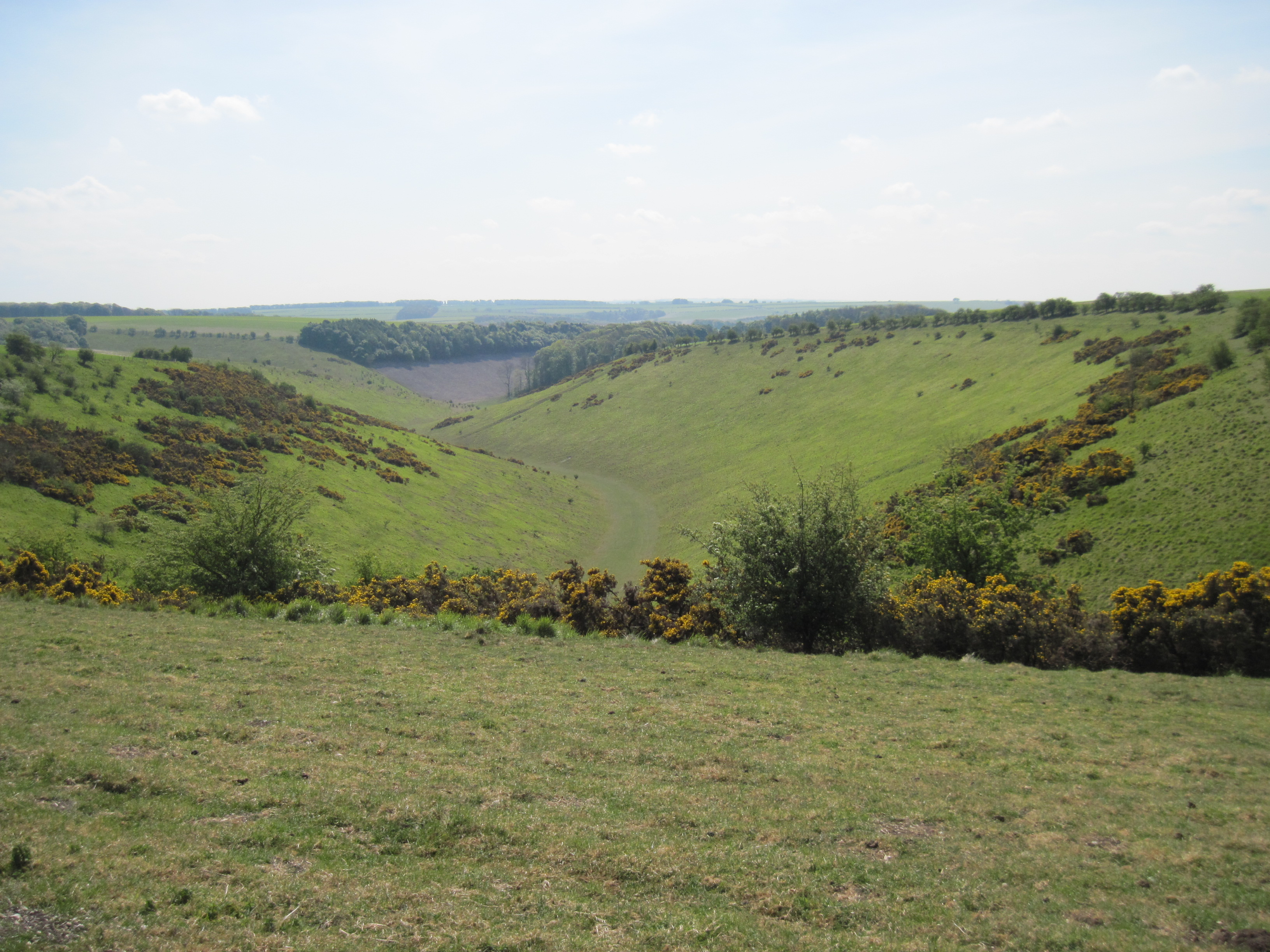
Well Dale near Huggate

The path heads west out of North Dalton climbing all the time to pass in a northerly direction through Blanch Farm and along the farm road to get to a minor road. The way heads north-west onto the Hawold Bridle Road and west on another green track along Huggate Heads. Near Cobdale farm the path meets the Wolds Way and heads south along it and the two ways climb steeply up onto Cow Moor above Millington Dale before making a steep descent into and out of Sylvan Dale onto the Becks. At Warren Farm the two paths separate and the Minster Way heads west down into Millington via Millington Bottom. The path heads north-westerly out of Millington and climbs again crossing a road and onto the track to Little Givendale Farm passing it on the left before reaching Great Givendale itself. From the village of Great Givendale the walk heads north and west above the West Pasture to Bishop Wilton.

=== Bishop Wilton to York Minster ===
The path heads through Bishop Wilton along the main street and heads north on Thorny Lane to Bray Gate and then heads west again to Youlthorpe. The walk passes to the north of the village and on to Full Sutton. The Minster Way follows the road from Full Sutton past the prison and all the way past the historic battlefield site into the centre of Stamford Bridge. It then crosses the bridge and southwards alongside the River Derwent downstream to Kexby.

The walk enters Kexby from the north and exits north after the bridge. The path heads west along the southern edge of Millfield Wood and then through it to emerge at the A1079 at Scoreby Lodge. The path crosses Kexby Stray southward past White Carr Farm, along Rabbit Warren Wood and on to Kexby Stray Farm. The path heads west and then south across Kexby Common over the B1228 to the north of Elvington Airfield. The path then meanders in a north-west direction over Heslington Common to cross over the A64 York Bypass by way of the bridge.

The path heads north to Fulford on the outskirts of York and crosses the A19 and joins a footpath leading towards the river. The walk follows the edge of the flood barrier then onto the bank of the River Ouse into York to meet the Foss Walk at the footbridge over the River Foss. The path heads north to Lendal Bridge where the walk climbs a set of steps and turn east to York city centre and to the Minster.

== Image gallery ==
Sights along the Minster Way
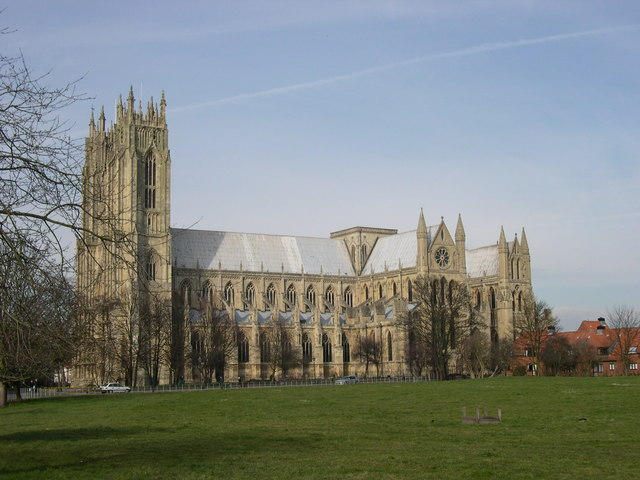
Beverley Minster

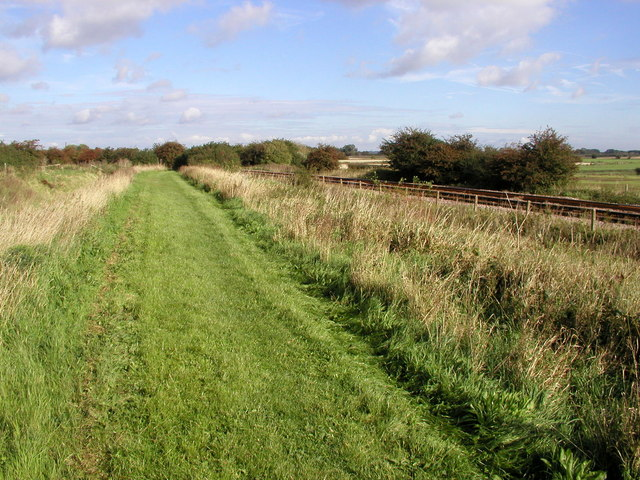
The Minster Way and Hull to Scarborough Railway near Arram

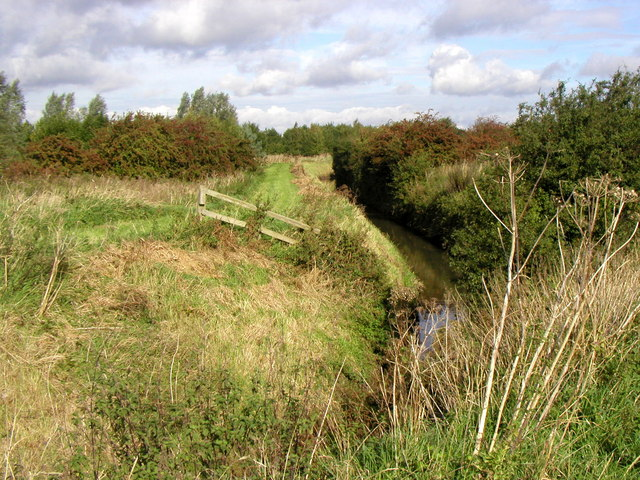
Catchwater Drain near Arram

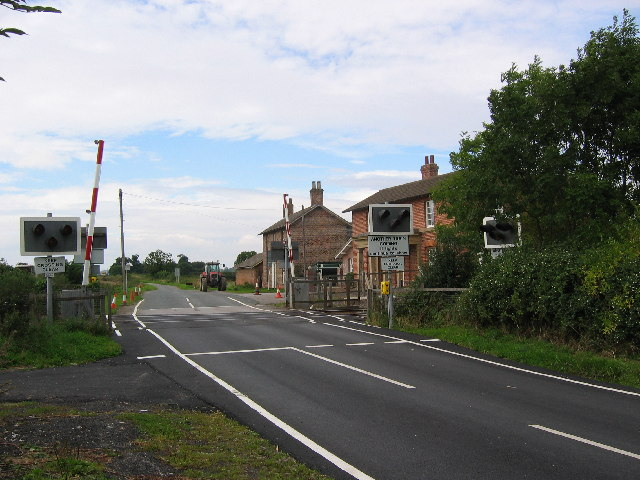
Lockington Crossing

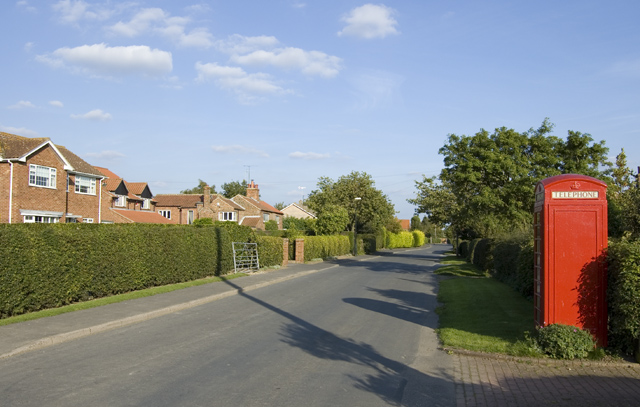
Main Street Kilnwick

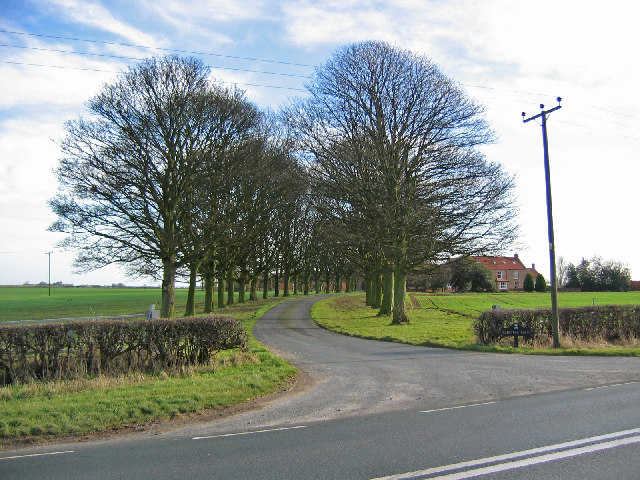
Bainton Balk Farm

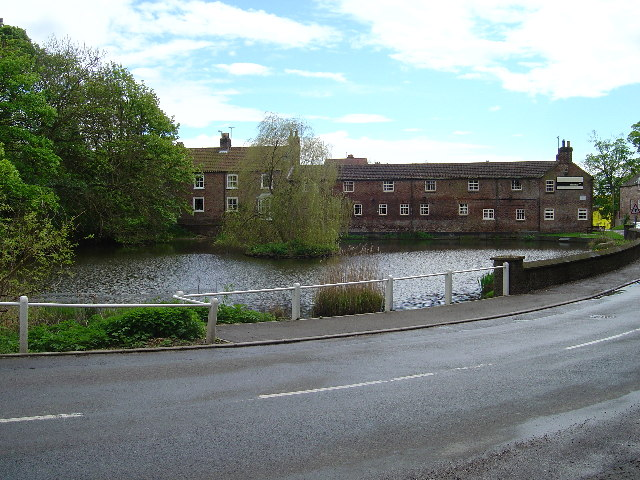
North Dalton Village pond

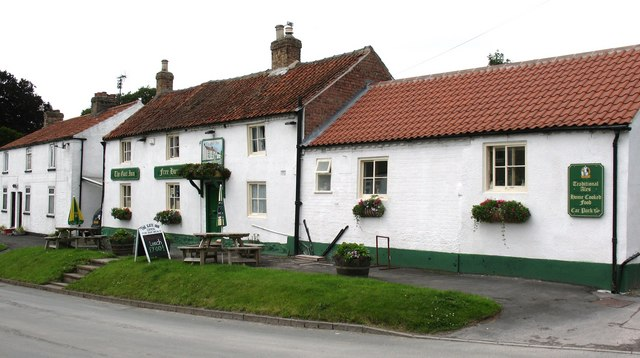
The Gait Inn Millington

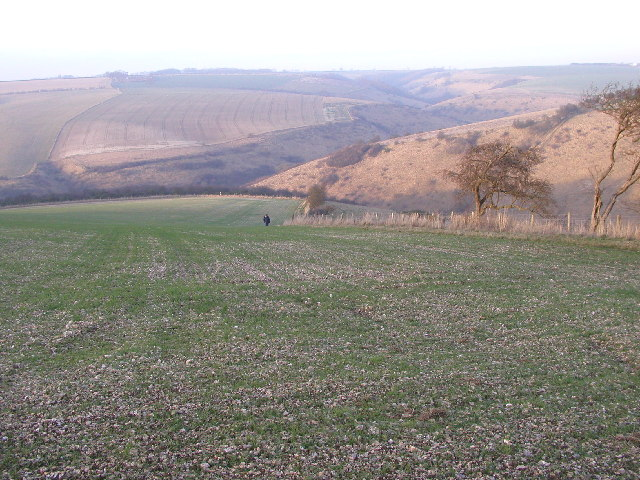
On the Minster Way near Millington

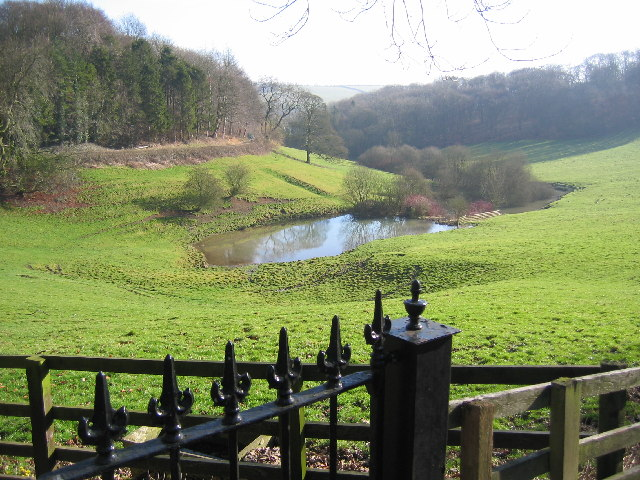
Great Givendale – Ponds

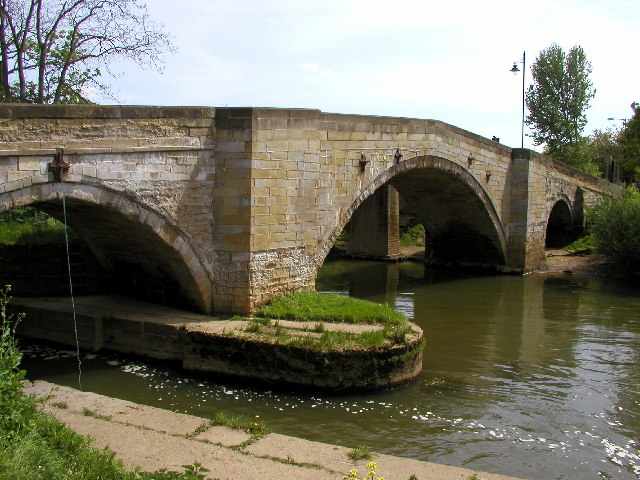
The road bridge at Stamford Bridge over the River Derwent

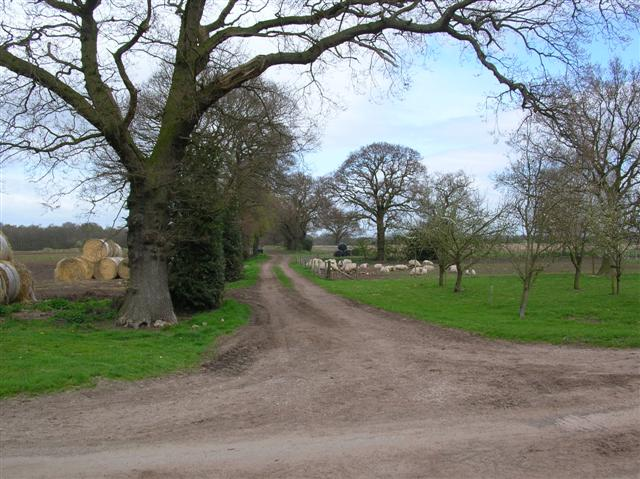
Kexby Stray

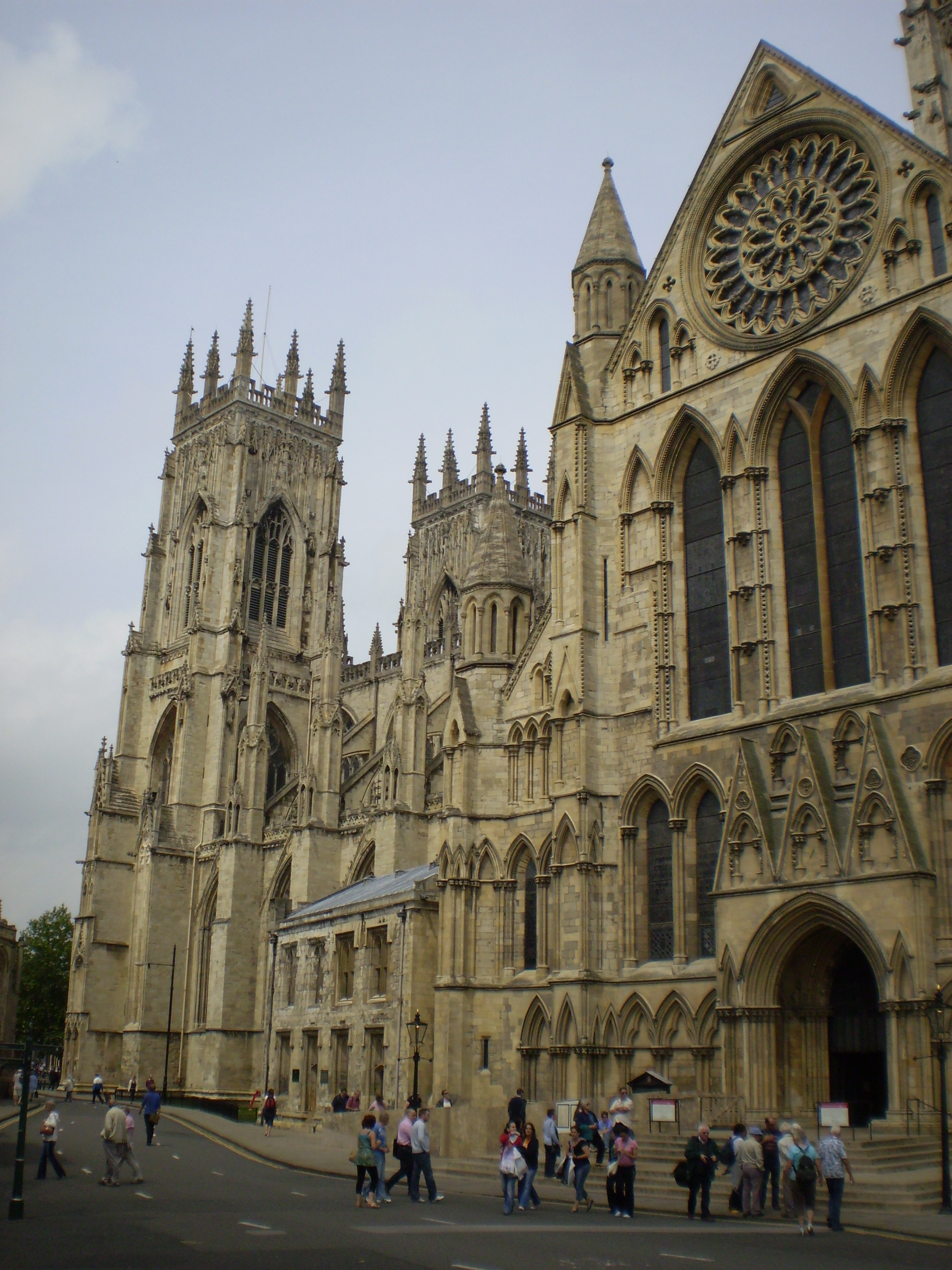
York Minster

== Sources ==
- Ordnance Survey Explorer 293 Kingston upon Hull & Beverley
- Ordnance Survey Explorer 295 Bridlington, Driffield & Hornsea
- Ordnance Survey Explorer 294 Market Weighton & Yorkshire Wolds Central
- Ordnance Survey Explorer 290 York
