= Chalkland Way =

40-mile circular footpath in northern England

The Chalkland Way
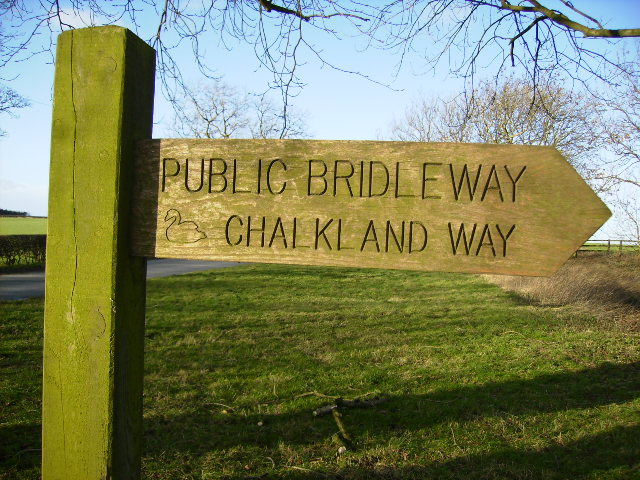
- Fingerpost pointing out the direction of Chalkland Way
- Length: 40.8 mi (65.7 km)
- Location: North Yorkshire; East Riding of Yorkshire, England
- Use: Hiking
- Highest point: 787 ft (240 m)
- Difficulty: Challenging
- Hazards: Road crossings Steep ascents and descents Stiles and gates Uneven surfaces

The Chalkland Way is a 40-mile (64 km) circular walking route in the East Riding of Yorkshire and North Yorkshire, England. The route covers the chalky hills and valleys of the western Yorkshire Wolds, with the common starting point in the town of Pocklington.

== History ==
The Chalkland Way was first established by Ray Wallis in 1994. The waymark badge is a black swan on a green background encircled by the walk's name at the top and the words "Ramblers Association" to the bottom.

== Route ==
The route crosses a number of other long-distance walks, notably the Yorkshire Wolds National Trail, the Centenary Way (North Yorkshire), the Minster Way, and the Wilberforce Way.

=== Clockwise from Pocklington to Bugthorpe ===
From the western end of Market Place, the route follows the road north east via Union Street before turning off left down Target Lane and Denison Road out towards Pocklington Wood across the open fields. The route curves back west before turning north along a short part of a road and then continues across fields near Broad Ings. It then climbs through Grimthorpe Wood to the peak of Great Givendale (486 feet (148 m)) and joins the Minster Way. The route goes through the village of Bishop Wilton before departing from the Minster Way near Youlthorpe. Here it crosses the A166 and passes close to Bugthorpe.

The route turns mostly east over fields and through several farms before briefly joining the Centenary Way just outside Thixendale. On the other side of the village, the route turns south-east and goes through the hamlet of Fimber. Crossing farmland it then reaches the village of Wetwang on the A166. On leaving the village, the path curves south and then west towards Huggate. It skirts the northern edge of the village before entering woodland and turns south to again join the Minster Way near Millington Wood. Passing to the north of Kilnwick Percy it rejoins the starting path south of Pocklington Wood to end back at the Market Place.

== Images ==
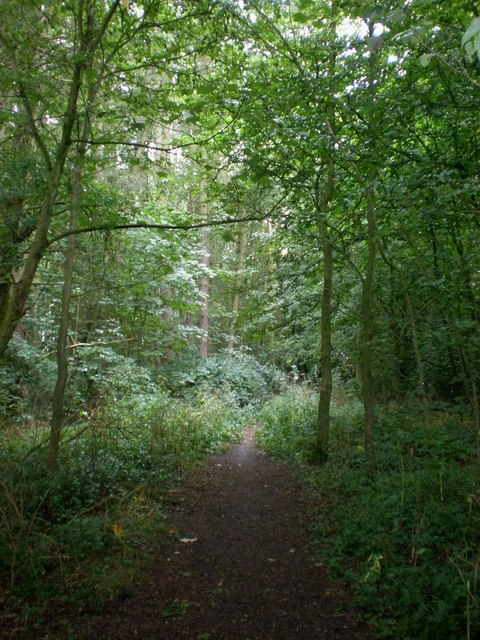
The Chalkland Way through Pocklington Wood

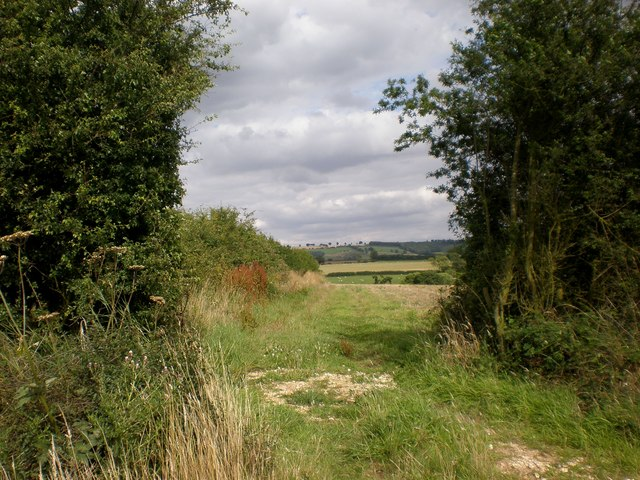
The Chalkland Way, north east of Bugthorpe

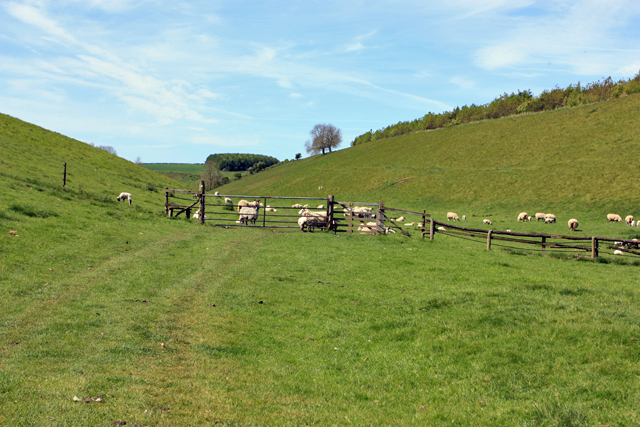
The Chalkland Way ascends Thixen Dale

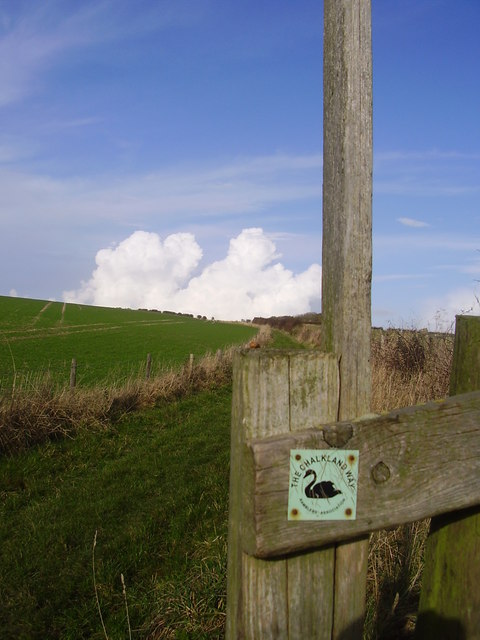
Chalkland Way above Horsedale

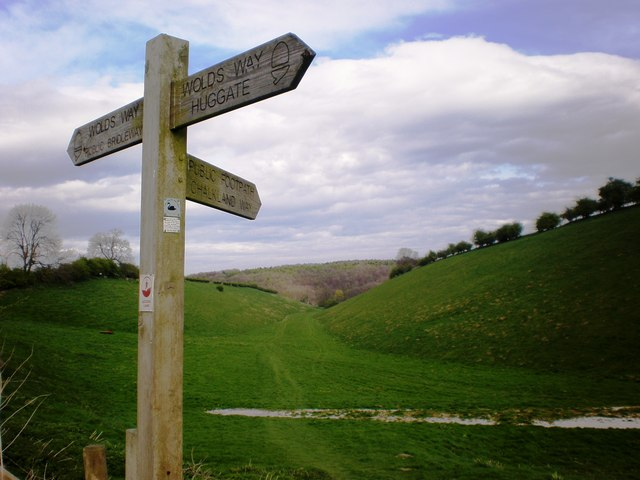
Junction of the Yorkshire Wolds Way with the Chalkland Way

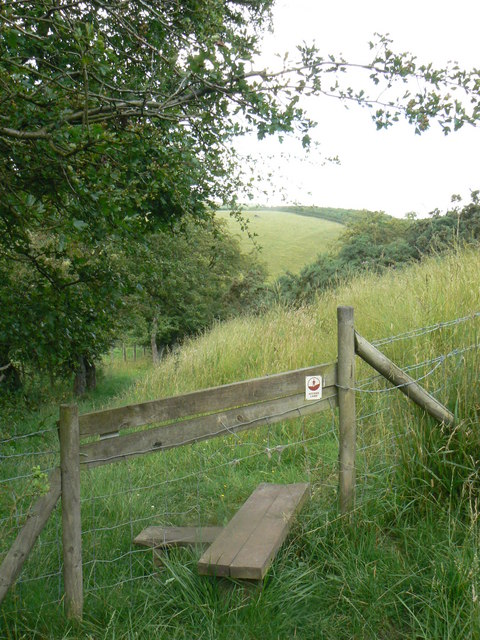
Along the Chalkland Way above Millington Dale

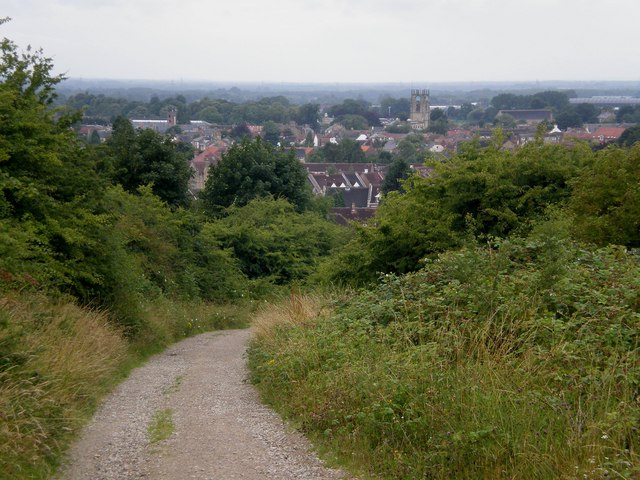
The Chalkland Way into Pocklington

== Sources ==
- OS Landranger 100, 101, 105, 106
- OS Landranger Active 100, 101, 105, 106
- OS Explorer 294, 300
- OS Explorer Active 294, 300
