= Listed buildings in Bishop Wilton =

Bishop Wilton is a civil parish in the county of the East Riding of Yorkshire, England. It contains 18 listed buildings that are recorded in the National Heritage List for England. Of these, one is listed at Grade I, the highest of the three grades, and the others are at Grade II, the lowest grade. The parish contains the village of Bishop Wilton, the hamlets of Gowthorpe and Youlthorpe, and the surrounding countryside. Most of the listed buildings are houses and associated structures, and the others include a farmhouse and a barn, a church and a lamp standard in the churchyard, two milestones, and two telephone kiosks.

== Key ==
Grade	Criteria
I	Buildings of exceptional interest, sometimes considered to be internationally important
II	Buildings of national importance and special interest

== Buildings ==
Name and location	Photograph	Date	Notes	Grade
St Edith's Church; 53.98679°N 0.78418°W		12th century	The church has been altered and extended through the centuries, and it was restored in 1858–59 by J. L. Pearson. It is built in stone with tile roofs, and consists of a nave, north and south aisles, a south porch, a north transept, a chancel with a north vestry, and a west steeple embraced by the aisles. The steeple has a tower on a high moulded plinth, western buttresses, a west window with a pointed head and a hood mould, a south clock face, two-light pointed bell openings, and an embattled parapet with crocketed corner pinnacles. On the tower is a recessed octagonal spire with a weathercock. The south doorway has a round arch with three orders, and is highly decorated with a variety of motifs.	I
Barn east of 39 Main Street; 53.98493°N 0.78671°W		Early 18th century (probable)	The barn is in stone, with brick dressings, quoins, and a pantile roof. There are two storeys, and three bays. The barn has a doorway and a slit vent on the ground floor, and a loading door above.	II
58 Main Street; 53.98606°N 0.78356°W	—	Early to mid-18th century	The house is in red brick, with a partial floor band, a partial stepped brick eaves cornice and a pantile roof with tumbled-in brickwork on the left raised gables, and plain close verges on the right. There are two storeys and five bays, the right three bays recessed, with a porch under a lean-to roof in the angle, and a continuous rear outshut. The windows are sashes.	II
94 Main Street; 53.98649°N 0.78368°W		Mid-18th century	The house is in orange brick, with a floor band to the original part, a dentilled eaves cornice, and a pantile roof with tumbled-in brick to plain close verges. There are two storeys, three bays, and a single-bay extension to the right. The doorway has pilasters with paterae, and a decorative fanlight, and the windows are sashes with flat gauged brick arches.	II
East Farmhouse; 53.99027°N 0.83039°W	—	Mid-18th century	The farmhouse is in red brick, and has a pantile roof with tumbled-in brick to plain close verges. There are two storeys, an L-shaped plan, and a front of three bays. The central doorway has a fanlight, and the windows are sashes with flat gauged brick arches.	II
Barn, East Farm; 53.99015°N 0.83110°W	—	Mid to late 18th century	The barn is in red brick, with a stepped brick eaves cornice, and a pantile roof with tumbled-in brick to the raised gables. There are two storeys and three bays, the middle bay projecting at the front and rear and containing opposing wagon entrances. There are paired slit vents on both floors.	II
39 Main Street and outbuilding 53.98463°N 0.78728°W	—	Late 18th century	The house is in colourwashed brick on a plinth, with a stepped brick eaves cornice, and a pantile roof, with a raised gable on the right and plain close verges on the left. There are two storeys and three bays. Steps lead up to the central doorway that has a fluted architrave, and a projecting hood. The windows are sashes, those on the ground floor with segmental arches, and those on the upper floor with flat arches. To the right is a stone outbuilding with a pantile roof.	II
Garrowby Lodge; 53.99970°N 0.80252°W		Late 18th century	The house, which has been extended, is in colourwashed brick, with a dentilled eaves cornice, and a pantile roof with raised coped gables and shaped kneelers. There are two storeys, the original part has three bays, to the right is an extension of three bays and to the left is a two-bay extension. In the centre of the original part is a segmental-arched doorway with a radial fanlight, above which is a round-arched sash window. On the right extension is a doorway with a rectangular fanlight, and elsewhere all the windows are flat-headed sashes.	II
The Chestnuts; 53.98401°N 0.78792°W	—	Late 18th century (or earlier)	The house is in red-brown brick, with a dentilled brick eaves cornice, and a pantile roof with raised coped gables and shaped kneelers. There are two storeys and a basement and three bays, and a lower two-storey one-bay extension recessed on the right. The windows are sashes, with cambered gauged brick arches. The extension has tumbled-in brickwork on coped gables, a doorway and modern windows.	II
38 Main Street; 53.98451°N 0.78752°W	—	Late 18th to early 19th century	The house is in rendered brick, on a plinth, with a pantile roof. There are two storeys and three bays. Steps lead up to the central doorway that has a fluted architrave and a pediment, and the windows are sashes.	II
78 Main Street; 53.98722°N 0.78127°W		Late 18th to early 19th century	The house is in red brick with a pantile roof. There are two storeys and three bays. The doorway is in the centre, the windows are sashes, and all the openings have segmental brick arches.	II
Lime Tree House; 53.98366°N 0.78904°W	—	Late 18th to early 19th century	The house is in red brick with some stone in the left gable wall, and a pantile roof with plain close verges. There are two storeys and three bays. The central doorway has pilasters, a fanlight, and a hood on brackets with an ornate valance. The windows are sashes with segmental brick arches.	II
Milestone at SE 758562; 53.99620°N 0.84580°W		Early 19th century	The milestone on the south side of the A166 road is in limestone. It consists of a three-stepped stone, on which is a cast iron plate inscribed with the distance to York.	II
Milestone at SE 789566; 53.99916°N 0.79728°W		Early 19th century	The milestone on the south side of the A166 road is in limestone. It consists of a three-stepped stone, on which is a cast iron plate inscribed with the distance to York.	II
Mosquito Cottage; 53.98638°N 0.78388°W		Early 19th century	The house is in brick, and has a pantile roof, hipped on the right and with plain close verges on the left. There are two storeys and two bays. The doorway is in the centre, and the windows are sashes, those on the ground floor with cambered gauged brick arches, and those on the upper floor with flat brick arches.	II
Lamp standard, St Edith's Church; 53.98660°N 0.78415°W	—	Late 19th century	The lamp standard, in the churchyard to the south of the church, is in wrought iron. It consists of an open four-sided shaft on a high base with floral ornament, carrying an octagonal lamp, surrounded by scrolled ironwork under a scrolled iron finial.	II
A.A. Box No 573; 53.99959°N 0.80218°W		Early 20th century	The telephone kiosk is by the A166 road to the east of Garrowby Lodge. It is in wood with an ashfelt roof, gabled on each side, and has a square plan. On the front is a door which gave access to an emergency telephone.	II
Telephone kiosk 53.98541°N 0.78674°W	—	1935	The telephone kiosk in Main Street is of the K6 type designed by Giles Gilbert Scott. Constructed in cast iron with a square plan and a dome, it has three unperforated crowns in the top panels.	II
