= St Margaret's Church, Millington =

Church in the East Riding of Yorkshire, England

Coordinates: 53°57′22″N 0°44′11″W

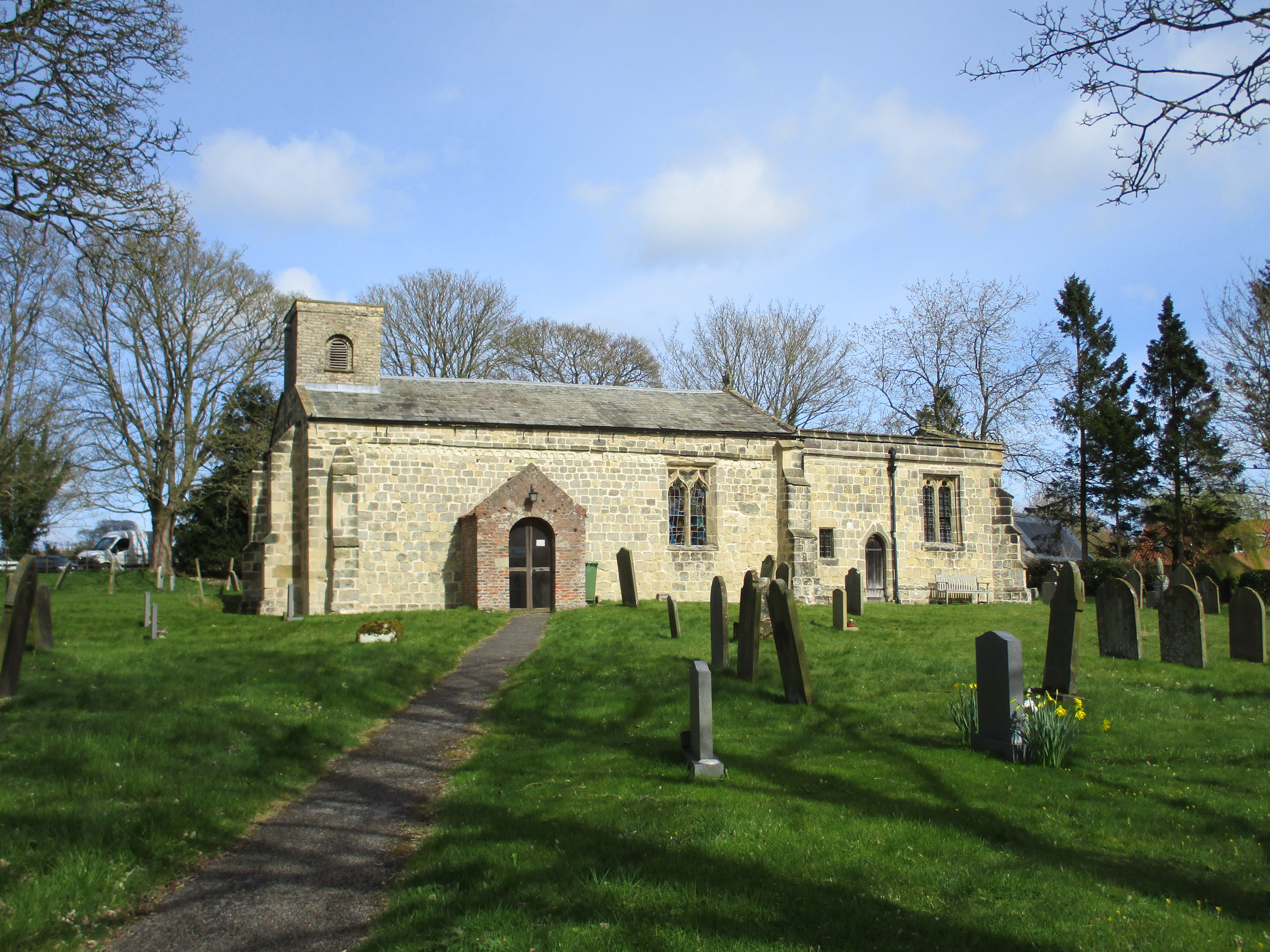
The church, in 2022

St Margaret's Church is the parish church of Millington, East Riding of Yorkshire, a village in England.

The church was built in the 12th century, from which period the nave survives. The chancel was added in the 14th century, and a small tower was constructed in 1824. The building was restored by Temple Moore between 1882 and 1883, and a porch was added in the 20th century. The church was grade I listed in 1967.

View from the nave into the chancel

The church is built of stone, with red brick in the porch, yellow brick to the bell turret, and has a slate roof. The church consists of a nave, a south porch, a chancel, and a bell turret at the west end with round-headed louvered bell openings. The south door is Norman with three orders and attached columns. Inside, there is a west gallery, and the nave has a panelled dado. In the south nave is a modern stained glass window depicting the Road to Emmaus appearance. Installed in 2007, it was designed and made by the glass artist Thomas Denny.

== See also ==
- Grade I listed buildings in the East Riding of Yorkshire
- Listed buildings in Millington, East Riding of Yorkshire
