= A166 road =

A-road in Yorkshire, England

A166

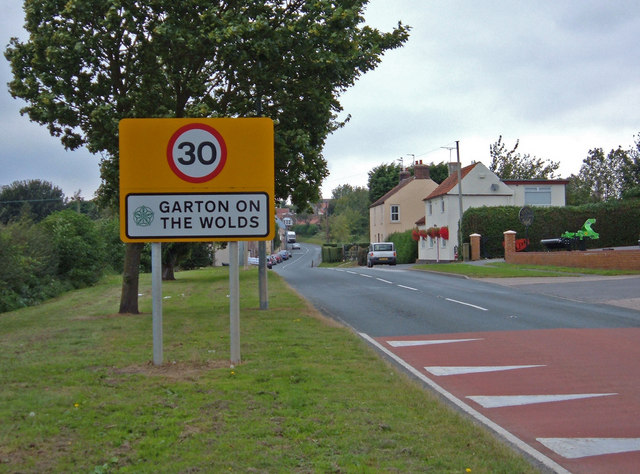
- A166 entering Garton on the Wolds from the east

Route information
- Length: 24.72 mi (39.78 km)

Major junctions
- West end: Grimston Bar
- A64 A614
- East end: A614

Location
- Country: United Kingdom
- Primary destinations: York; Driffield

Road network
- Roads in the United Kingdom; Motorways; A and B road zones
← A165	→ A167

The A166 road is a regional road between the outskirts of York and Driffield in the historic county of Yorkshire. The road used to terminate at the seaside town of Bridlington, until the opening of the Driffield by-pass caused the final section to be renumbered as the A614.

== History ==
The A166 follows the path of an old Roman road from York to Stamford Bridge, where it forded the river at the place where the modern Stamford Bridge is located. The bridge is mentioned in the Anglo-Saxon Chronicle about the Battle of Stamford Bridge in 1066. The road was turnpiked between York and Stone Dale as part of the York, Kexby Bridge, Grimston and Stone Dale Turnpike Trust established by the Roads from York and from Grimston Act 1807 (47 Geo. 3 Sess. 2. c. cxxxiii). A turnpike trust had existed since 1765, but this included new maintenance provisions. The trust lasted until 1872. The turnpike started from Grimston Smithy and the introduction of a toll bar on the road at this place led to the eventual change of name to Grimston Bar.

There are a number of scheduled monuments that lay alongside the A166, most notably in the area of Garrowby Hill:

- Kitty Hill, round barrow
- Garrowby Hill Top Farm, three round barrows
- Cot Nab Farm, two round barrows and multiple linear dykes
- South Wold Farm, linear boundary dyke, two round barrows
- Fordham Farm, round barrow

In 1983, the Driffield by-pass was built and became the route of the A166, which had previously gone through the centre of the busy market town. The by-pass was renumbered in 1996 to become the A614 and thus shorten the historic old road.

In 2008, a feasibility study was carried out and proposals were put forward on behalf of the East Riding of Yorkshire Council for an alternative crossing of the River Derwent at Stamford Bridge. The current Grade II listed bridge only allows for one way flow and is controlled by traffic lights. It has a record for causing peak hour delays during the working week. Alternative routes included utilising the disused York to Beverley railway line crossing downstream from the current bridge. Also adding a new structure right next to the existing bridge was put forward. Other proposals involved two routes to the north of the river, one crossing just north of the caravan site on Buttercrambe Road and the other a complete new by-pass missing the village altogether. The report concluded that the best options did not score well enough for the Regional Transport Board to take forward and should not be pursued.

In 2009, the stretch of the A166 along Main Road and York Road, between the turnings for the B1248, in Wetwang was the location for the third and final intermediate sprint, which was won by Thomas De Gendt of Belgium, during that year's Tour of Britain Stage 1 from Scunthorpe to York.

== Route ==
The road starts as an exit on the Grimston Bar interchange on the A64 on the outskirts of York. It heads north east pass the turnings for Murton, Dunnington and Holtby within the first couple of miles. The first settlement that lies upon the road is Gate Helmsley. From here the road gradually turns in an easterly direction until it is required to cross the River Derwent at Stamford Bridge. The bridge lies north east to south west at the point where there used to be a fording point. On exiting the town, the road returns to a north east direction to follow the route of the old Roman road. On the next section there is a turning northward toward the hamlets of Buttercrambe and Scrayingham at which point it turns easterly again. This is closely followed by a staggered junction further on with an exit south towards Full Sutton and north to Skirpenbeck. There are also turnings soon after to the south for Youlthorpe and north to Bugthorpe.

Just south of the hamlet of Garrowby the road takes a sharp turn south and then back east at the foot of Garrowby Hill. The hill is the highest point on the Yorkshire Wolds and was the subject of a painting by David Hockney. The road up the hill covers 2.4 miles (3.9 km), rising from 177 feet (54 m) to 791 feet (241 m) at an average gradient of 4.8%. Part way up the hill, is the southerly turn off toward Bishop Wilton. Shortly after this junction an emergency stopping track can be seen on the downward side of the road. Consisting of gravel and sand, this is intended for vehicles to use in the event of a mechanical problem. There are several places where the road has been widened to allow slower traffic ascending or descending to pull to the left and allow faster vehicles to pass. In the next 3 miles (4.8 km), there are junctions with the routes to Great Givendale and Pocklington to the south and Thixendale to the north. At a dip and curve in the road known as Stone Dale, the road once more goes in a north east direction.

The A166 next runs through Fridaythorpe. On exiting the village, it meets the B1251 road to Bridlington, which is designated as a Scenic Route. Travelling in an easterly direction, the road follows an ancient green lane until it reaches the village of Wetwang. Either side of the village the road intersects the B1248 Beverley to Malton road. The road continues to Garton-on-the-Wolds, where it is met by the B1251 heading north west to Sledmere. From here it turns south east to its junction with the A614 Driffield By-pass.

Only junctions with classified designations are included in the table below.

A166 Road
Northbound* exits	Junction	Southbound* exits	Coordinates
Grimston Bar Junction A64 (road)	Grimston Bar; Roundabout	Start of road	53°57′28″N 1°00′41″W
Fimber, Sledmere, B1251			54°01′12.4″N 0°39′45.6″W
North Grimston, Malton, B1248		Tibthorpe, Bainton, Lund, Beverley B1248	54°01′07.2″N 0°35′35.5″W Northbound; 54°01′10.0″N 0°34′25.7″W Southbound
Sledmere, B1252			54°01′27.8″N 0°30′42.6″W
A614 road to Bridlington	York Road Roundabout	A614 road to Goole; York Road, Driffield, End of road	54°00′31.7″N 0°27′13.1″W

== Gallery ==
Images along the A166
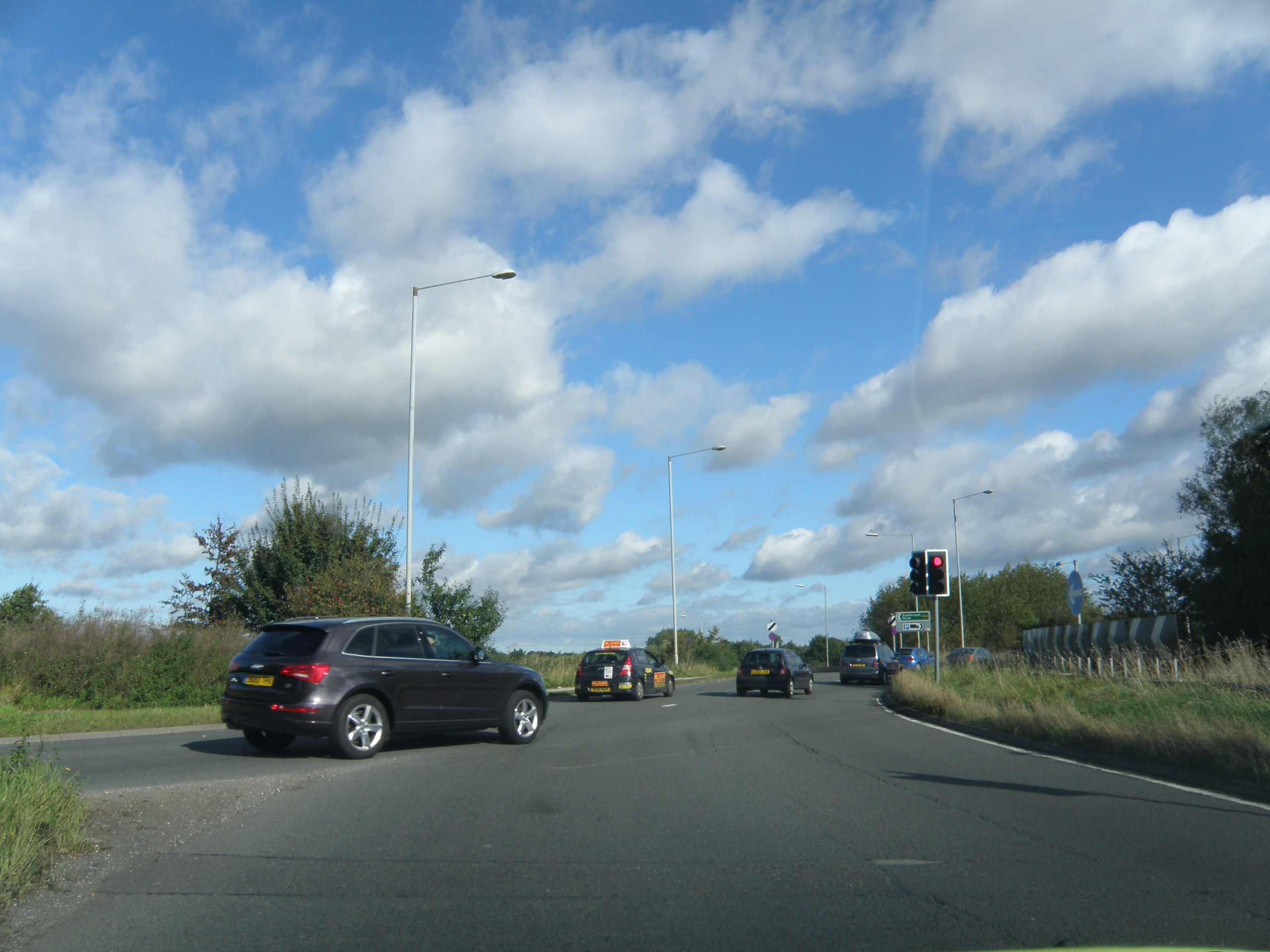
Grimston Bar junction showing A1079 and A166 exits

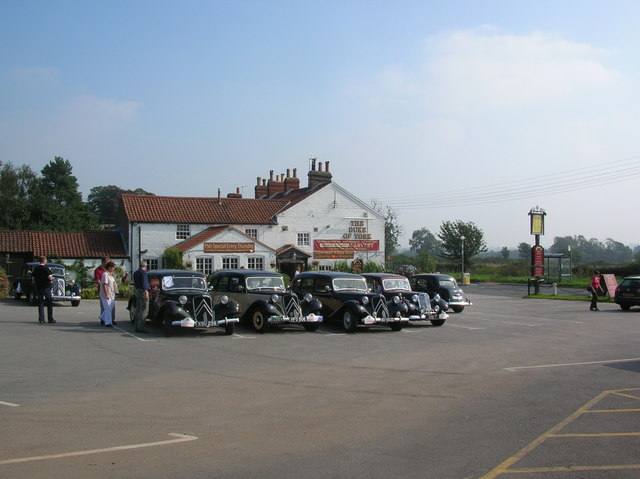
Duke of York on the A166 at Gate Helmsley

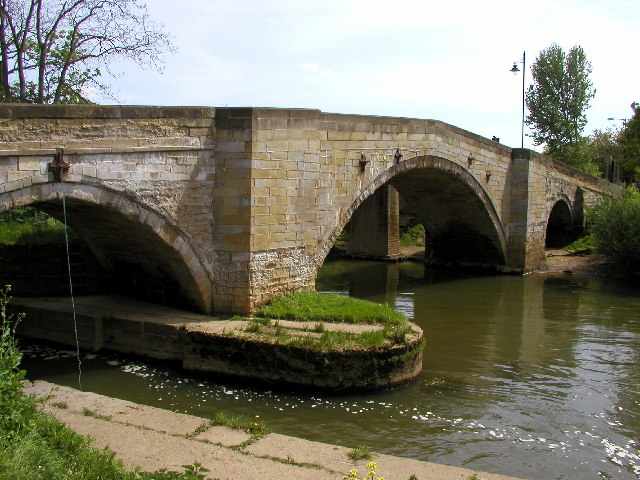
The road bridge at Stamford Bridge over the River Derwent

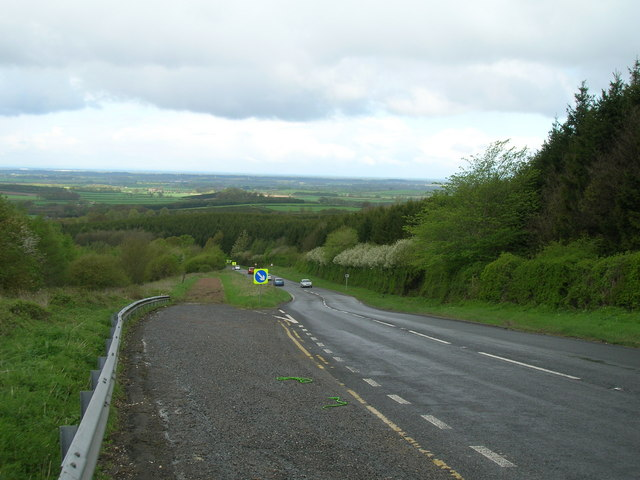
Garrowby Hill with Emergency Stopping Track

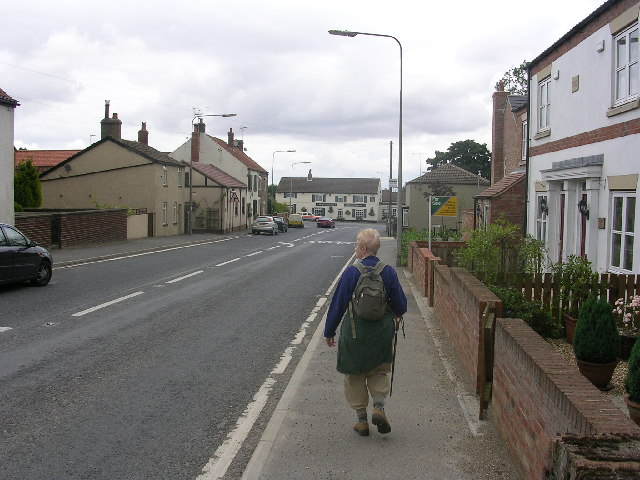
Fridaythorpe on the A166

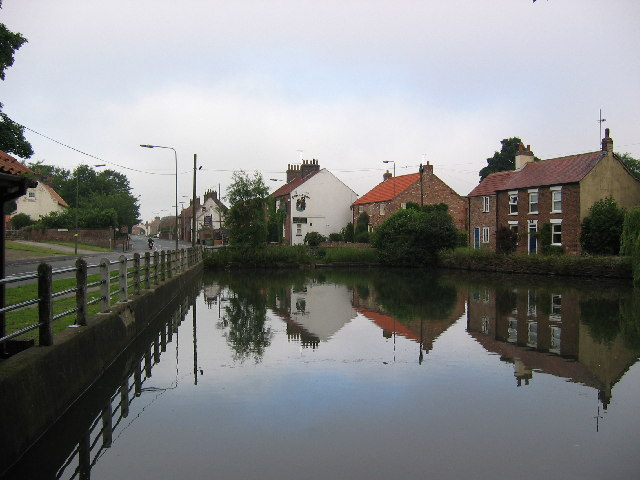
Village pond at Wetwang

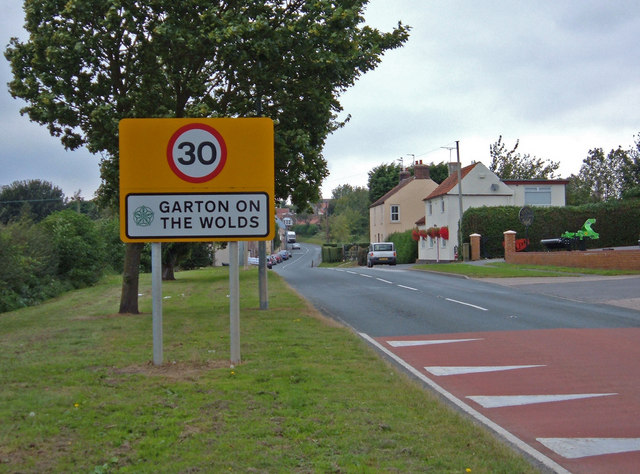
Garton on the Wolds

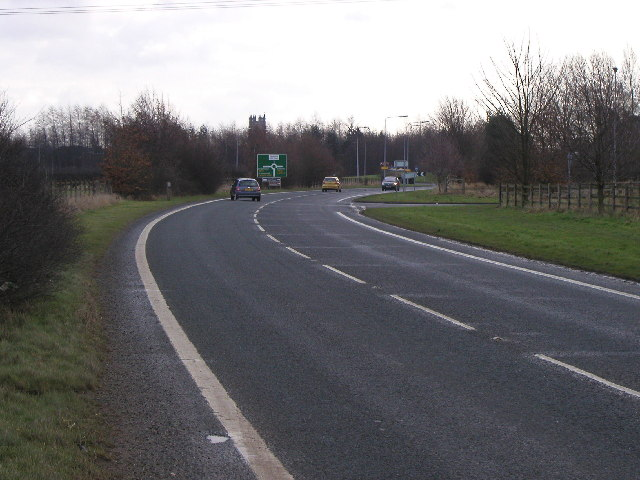
Driffield Bypass
