= Gowthorpe =

Hamlet in the East Riding of Yorkshire, England

Coordinates: 53.981063°N 0.837336°W

- Location within the East Riding of Yorkshire
- OS grid reference: SE763545
  - London: 175 mi (282 km) S
- Civil parish: Bishop Wilton
- Unitary authority: East Riding of Yorkshire
- Ceremonial county: East Riding of Yorkshire
- Region: Yorkshire and the Humber
- Country: England
- Sovereign state: United Kingdom
- Post town: YORK
- Postcode district: YO41
- Dialling code: 01759
- Police: Humberside
- Fire: Humberside
- Ambulance: Yorkshire
- UK Parliament: Bridlington and The Wolds

Gowthorpe is a hamlet in the East Riding of Yorkshire, England. It is situated approximately 4 miles (6 km) north-west of Pocklington town centre and 3 miles (5 km) east of the village of Stamford Bridge.

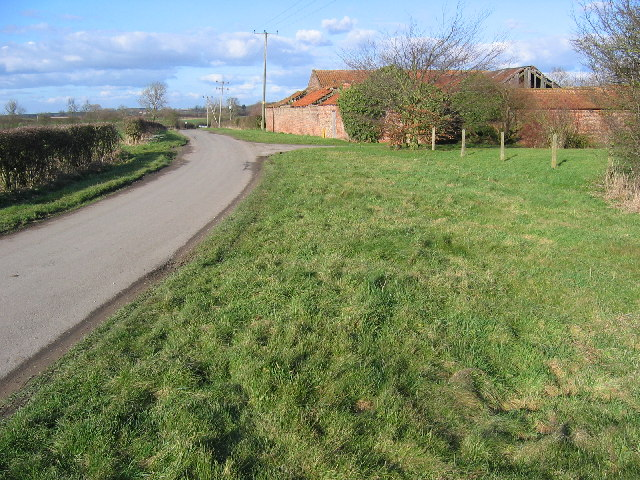
Gowthorpe

Gowthorpe forms part of the civil parish of Bishop Wilton.

From 1886 Gowthorpe was part of the civil parish of Youlthorpe with Gowthorpe which was abolished on 1 April 1935 with the creation of the civil parish of Bishop Wilton.

The name Gowthorpe probably derives from the Old Norse Gaukþorp meaning "Gauk's secondary settlement". It has also been suggested that the first element could be derived from gaukr meaning 'cuckoo'.
