= Huggate =

Village and civil parish in the East Riding of Yorkshire, England

Coordinates: 53°59′09″N 0°39′24″W

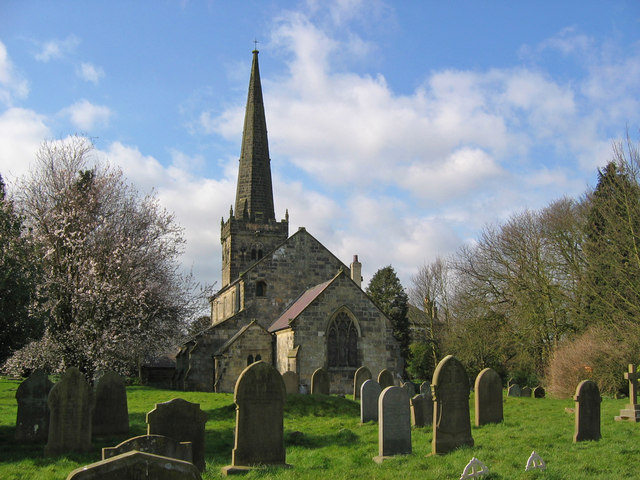
- St Mary's Church, Huggate

- Location within the East Riding of Yorkshire
- Population: 342 (2011 census)
- OS grid reference: SE881551
  - London: 170 mi (270 km) S
- Civil parish: Huggate
- Unitary authority: East Riding of Yorkshire
- Ceremonial county: East Riding of Yorkshire
- Region: Yorkshire and the Humber
- Country: England
- Sovereign state: United Kingdom
- Post town: YORK
- Postcode district: YO42
- Dialling code: 01377
- Police: Humberside
- Fire: Humberside
- Ambulance: Yorkshire
- UK Parliament: Bridlington and The Wolds

Huggate is a village and civil parish in the East Riding of Yorkshire, England. It is situated approximately 13 miles (21 km) north-west of Beverley town centre and 9 miles (14 km) west of Driffield town centre. The village of North Dalton lies 4 miles (6 km) to the south-east.

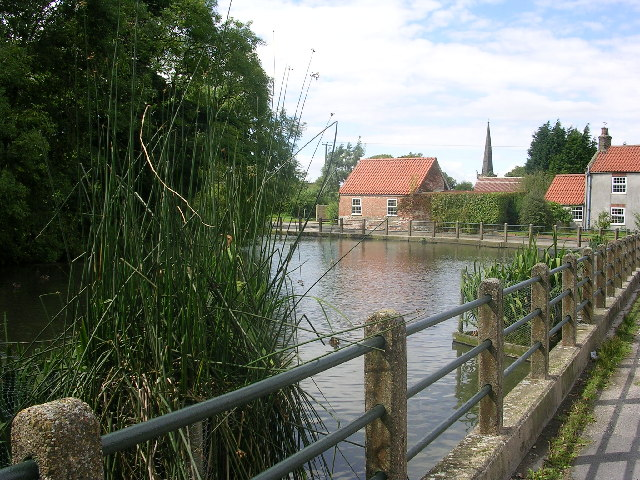
Huggate, the village pond

According to the 2011 UK census, Huggate parish had a population of 342, an increase on the 2001 UK census figure of 317.

Huggate has one of the deepest wells in England. The village contains the Wolds Inn public house on the Driffield road.

The Anglican St Mary's Church, Huggate is a Grade I listed building.

The Yorkshire Wolds Way National Trail, a long distance footpath passes to the north of the village. There are walks through the local area.

== History ==
'Huggate' is derived possibly from road to or near the mounds from the Old Norse haugr and gata.

In 1823 Huggate was a civil parish in the Wapentake of Harthill. The parish church was under the patronage of the King; a Methodist chapel also existed. A well, 116 yards (106 m) deep, supplied the village with water. At the end of July each year were held races. Population at the time was 413, with occupations including fourteen farmers, one of whom was also a butcher, a carpenter, two shopkeepers, a tailor, and a shoemaker. The landlord of The Chaise Inn public house was also a blacksmith and gunsmith. The ecclesiastical parish rector and curate, and the vicar of the village of Warter resided in Huggate. A carrier operated between the village and Pocklington once a week.

== Huggate Wold airstrip ==
To the north-west of the village, south of the A166 road is Huggate Wold. In the early 1940s, the site was surveyed for a bomber base, and building nearly went ahead, but a better location was found further west, which became RAF Full Sutton. However, in October 1943, the Royal Air Force created an airstrip from steel mesh at Huggate Wold to test the airstrip in preparation for the forthcoming invasion of Europe, which would require 'pop-up' airfields. Two RAF squadrons, 168 sqn and 170 sqn, both equipped with North American Mustang aircraft under the control of No. 123 Airfield Headquarters RAF, spent a week at the temporary airfield continually landing and taking-off so that the steel mesh airstrip could be assessed. It also gave the pilots and ground crew the experience of using the steel mesh airstrip in a field with no facilities.

== See also ==
- Listed buildings in Huggate
