= St Ethelburga's Church, Great Givendale =

Church in the East Riding of Yorkshire, England

Coordinates: 53°58′29″N 0°45′41″W

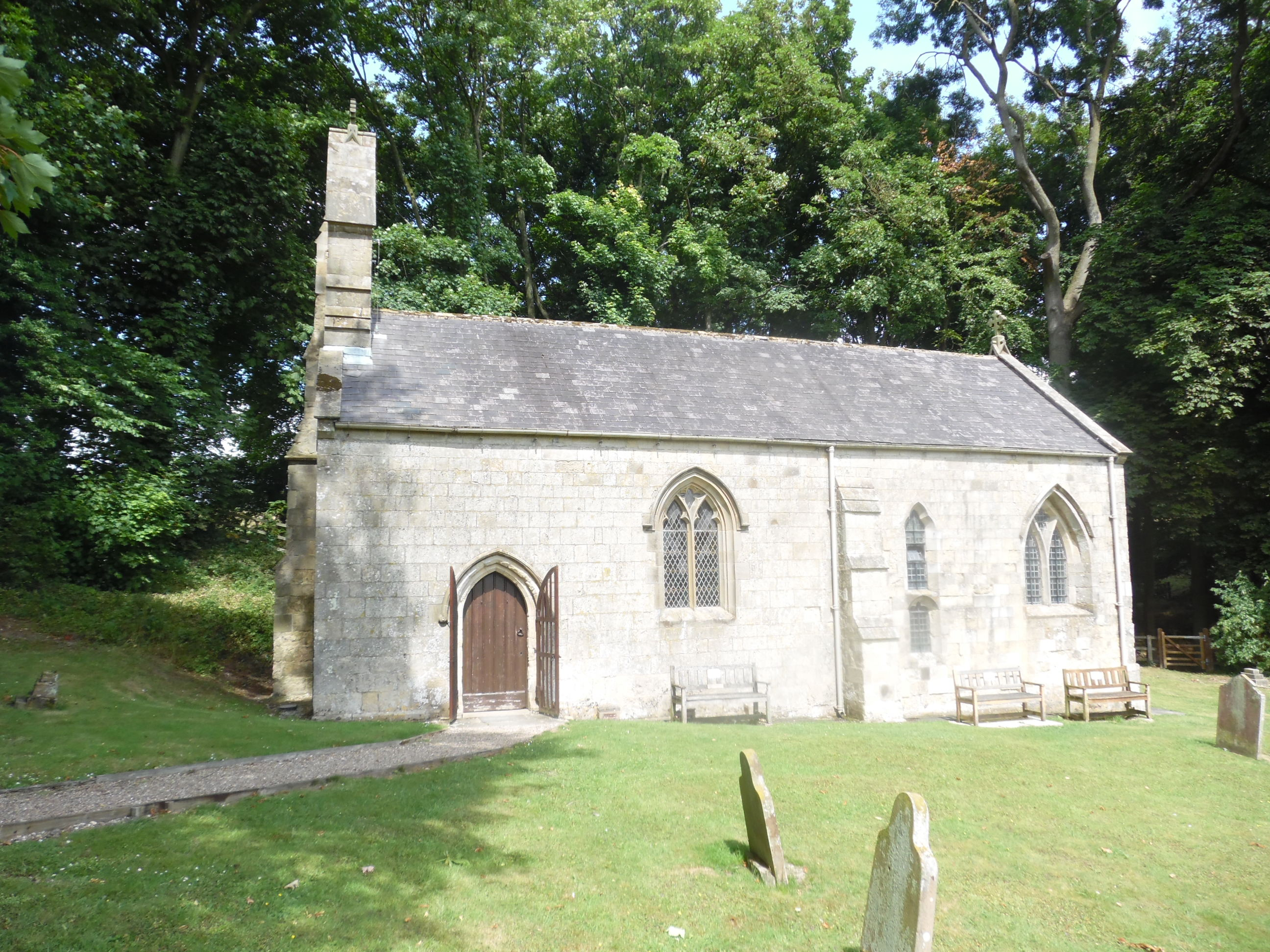
The church, in 2022

St Ethelburga's Church, also known as St Ethelburgh's Church, is an Anglican church in Great Givendale, a hamlet in the East Riding of Yorkshire, in England.

A church was built in Great Givendale around 1150. It was rebuilt in 1849, to a design by W. H. Dykes, who reused most of the old material. The building was grade II* listed in 1967.

View from the nave into the chancel

The church is built of stone with a slate roof, and consists of a nave and a chancel, and on the west end is a twin bellcote. Some of the windows in the chancel date from the 13th century, and the chancel arch is Norman with three orders, attached shafts, and scalloped capitals with carved foliage and human faces. There is a damaged 12th-century font, a 13th-century stoup and 17th- and 18th-century wall memorials.

== See also ==
- Grade II* listed buildings in the East Riding of Yorkshire
- Listed buildings in Millington, East Riding of Yorkshire
