= Listed buildings in Huggate =

Huggate is a civil parish in the county of the East Riding of Yorkshire, England. It contains six listed buildings that are recorded in the National Heritage List for England. Of these, one is listed at Grade I, the highest of the three grades, and the others are at Grade II, the lowest grade. The parish contains the village of Huggate and the surrounding countryside. The listed buildings consist of a church, a cross base, a house, two boundary stones and a war memorial.

== Key ==
Grade	Criteria
I	Buildings of exceptional interest, sometimes considered to be internationally important
II	Buildings of national importance and special interest

== Buildings ==
Name and location	Photograph	Date	Notes	Grade
St Mary's Church; 53.98814°N 0.65589°W		12th century	The church has been altered and extended through the centuries, including a restoration in 1864. It is built in stone with slate roofs, and consists of a nave with a clerestory, north and south aisles, a south porch, a chancel with a south vestry, and a west steeple. The steeple has a tower with diagonal buttresses, two-light bell openings, a cusped running scroll under blank quatrefoil panels to the embattled parapet, and crocketed corner pinnacles. On the tower is a spire with shallow buttresses, three tiers of crocketing and a finial cross.	I
Cross base, Glebe Farm; 53.99144°N 0.66742°W	—	Medieval (probable)	The cross base consists of a cubical block of sandstone with chamfer to the upper arris, and a square socket for the cross shaft.	II
The Manor House; 53.98547°N 0.65587°W		Late 16th or early 179th century	The house has a timber framed core, it is encased in brick, and has a pantile roof. There are two storeys and three bays, and a rear wing. The doorway has a rectangular fanlight and a cornice on consoles, and the windows are sashes. Inside, there is remaining timber framing.	II
Boundary stone at NGR SE 897545; 53.97880°N 0.63426°W	—	Early 19th century	The boundary stone consists of a sandstone slab about 0.3 metres (1 ft 0 in) in height. It is inscribed with initials.	II
Boundary stone at NGR SE868539; 53.97377°N 0.67799°W		Early 19th century	The boundary stone consists of a sandstone slab about 0.3 metres (1 ft 0 in) in height. It is inscribed with initials.	II
War memorial 53.98794°N 0.65597°W		1921	The war memorial is in the churchyard of St Mary's Church, to the south of the church. It is in stone, and consists of an obelisk with a pyramidal top, on a pedestal on a square base. The pedestal has a moulded top and a chamfered plinth. On the pedestal are panels with inscriptions and the names of those lost in the two World Wars.	II
