= St Mary's Church, Huggate =

Church in Huggate, East Riding of Yorkshire, England

Coordinates: 53°59′17″N 0°39′21″W

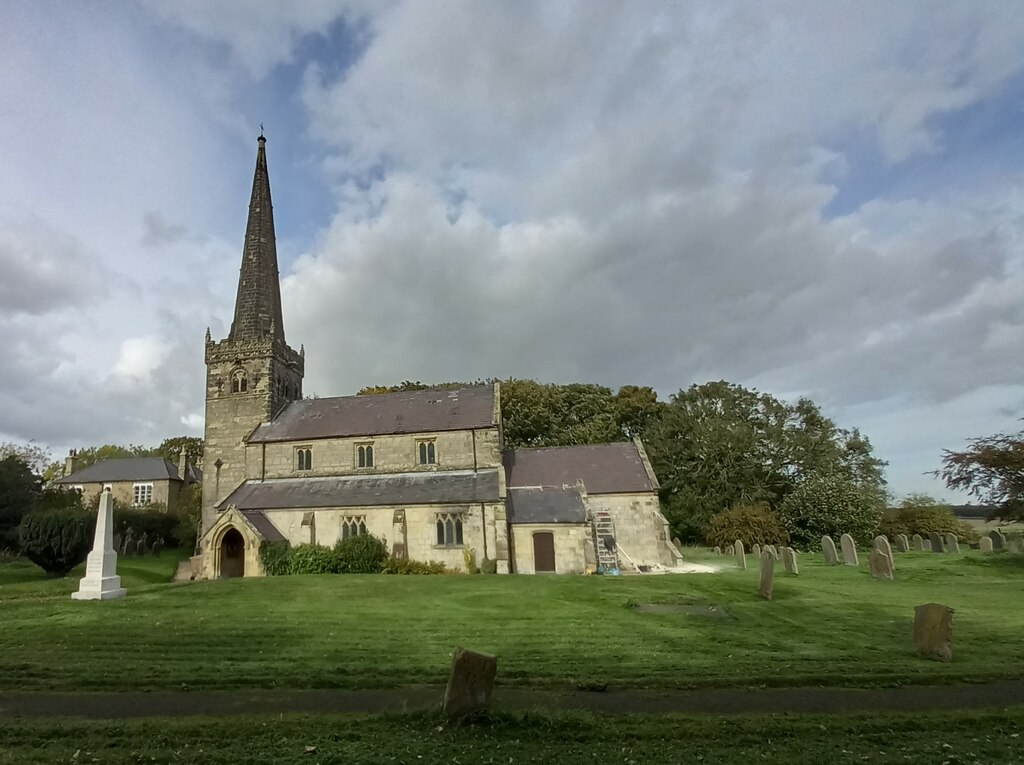
The church, in 2022

St Mary's Church is the parish church of Huggate, a village in the East Riding of Yorkshire, in England.

There has been a church in Huggate since at least the 11th century, with the oldest surviving part of the current building being the 12th-century nave. The chancel was built in the 13th century, followed in the early 14th century by the tower with its prominent spire. The church was restored in 1864, at which time a vestry and porch were added. The building was grade I listed in 1967.

The church is built of stone with slate roofs, and consists of a nave with a clerestory, north and south aisles, a south porch, a chancel with a south vestry, and a west steeple. The steeple has a tower with diagonal buttresses, two-light bell openings, a cusped running scroll under blank quatrefoil panels to the embattled parapet, and crocketed corner pinnacles. On the tower is a spire with shallow buttresses, three tiers of crocketing and a finial cross. Inside, the south arcade has capitals depicting animal and human heads. There is an octagonal 15th-century font and the east and west windows contain stained glass.

== See also ==
- Grade I listed buildings in the East Riding of Yorkshire
- Listed buildings in Huggate
