= Listed buildings in North Dalton =

North Dalton is a civil parish in the county of the East Riding of Yorkshire, England. It contains five listed buildings that are recorded in the National Heritage List for England. Of these, one is listed at Grade II*, the middle of the three grades, and the others are at Grade II, the lowest grade. The parish contains the village of North Dalton and the surrounding countryside. The listed buildings consist of a church, a farmhouse, a dovecote, a pair of gate piers and a row of cottages.

== Key ==
Grade	Criteria
II*	Particularly important buildings of more than special interest
II	Buildings of national importance and special interest

== Buildings ==
Name and location	Photograph	Date	Notes	Grade
All Saints' Church; 53.95744°N 0.57711°W		12th century	The church has been altered and extended through the centuries, including a restoration in 1872–74. It is built in stone with slate roofs, and consists of a nave, a chancel and a west tower. The tower has three stages, a moulded plinth, diagonal buttresses, moulded string courses, a two-light pointed west window, pointed two-light bell openings with hood moulds, and a cusped running scroll under a pierced embattled parapet with corner pinnacles. The south door is Norman with three orders, and attached shafts with decorated capitals.	II*
Warter Farmhouse; 53.94369°N 0.62216°W		c. 1630	A parallel range was added to the farmhouse in the 19th century. The early part is in stone, the later part in brick, and the roofs are pantiled. There are two storeys, a shaped gable, and a pediment with acroteria. The windows are mullioned and transomed with hood moulds. To the right is a single-storey range containing a square window with a hood mould.	II
Gate piers, Manor House; 53.95689°N 0.57670°W	—	c. 1700	The gate piers flanking the entrance to the grounds are in red brick with stone dressings. They have a square plan, and each pier has a moulded cornice and a ball finial.	II
Dovecote, Manor House; 53.95690°N 0.57720°W	—	Mid-18th century	The dovecote is in brick, and has a pantile roof with tumbled-in brick to the raised gable. There is a rectangular plan, the doorway on the gable end has a segmental arch, and above it are holes for birds.	II
Ransomes Row; 53.95730°N 0.57293°W		c. 1820	An estate house and a row of four cottages in red brick with a pantile roof. There are two storeys and seven bays. The left doorway has pilasters, an entablature and a hood, and the other four doorways have segmental brick heads. The windows are sashes, those on the ground floor with segmental brick heads.	II
