= Great Givendale =

Hamlet in the East Riding of Yorkshire, England

Coordinates: 53°58′27″N 0°45′52″W

- Location within the East Riding of Yorkshire
- OS grid reference: SE812537
  - London: 170 mi (270 km) S
- Civil parish: Millington
- Unitary authority: East Riding of Yorkshire
- Ceremonial county: East Riding of Yorkshire
- Region: Yorkshire and the Humber
- Country: England
- Sovereign state: United Kingdom
- Post town: YORK
- Postcode district: YO42
- Dialling code: 01759
- Police: Humberside
- Fire: Humberside
- Ambulance: Yorkshire
- UK Parliament: Bridlington and The Wolds

Great Givendale is a hamlet in the East Riding of Yorkshire, England. It is situated approximately 3 miles (5 km) north of Pocklington.

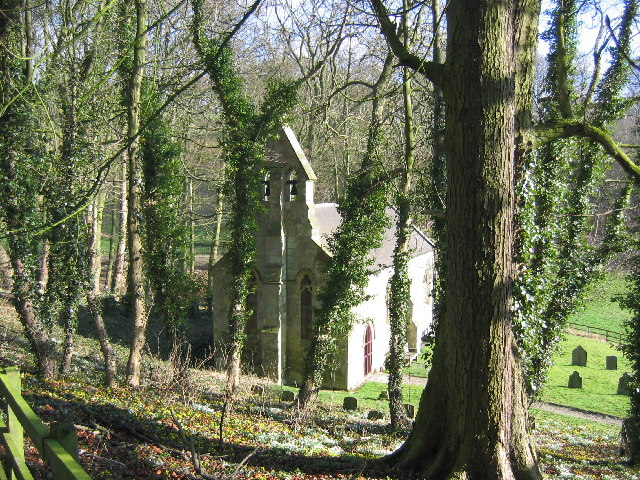
St Ethelburga's Church, Great Givendale

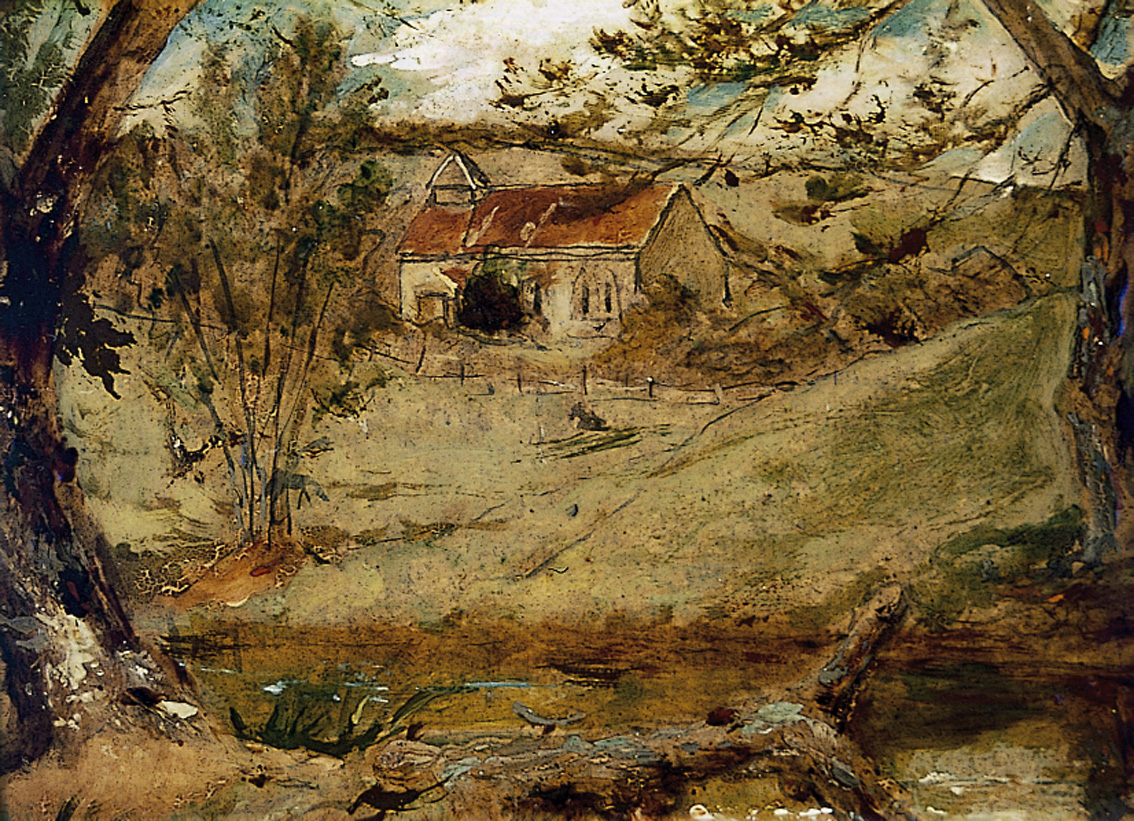
Givendale Church by William Etty

Great Givendale forms part of the civil parish of Millington.

The name Givendale possibly derives from the Old English gifoldæl meaning 'bountiful valley'. The name also could possibly refer to a lost river such as Gaevul.

The Anglican St Ethelburgh's Church, Great Givendale was designated a Grade II* listed building in 1967 and is now recorded in the National Heritage List for England, maintained by Historic England.

The Minster Way and Chalkland Way long-distance footpaths pass through the main street of the village.

There is also a scout camp located near the hamlet, which is a green field campsite.

In 1823 Great Givendale was a village and civil parish, in the Wapentake of Harthill and the Liberty of St Peter's, that included the settlement of Little Givendale. The church was under the patronage of the Dean of York. Parish population at the time was 60, which included four farmers and a gentleman.

== See also ==
- Listed buildings in Millington, East Riding of Yorkshire
