= Bracken, East Riding of Yorkshire =

Manor and hamlet in the East Riding of Yorkshire, England

Coordinates: 53.939422°N 0.503643°W

Bracken
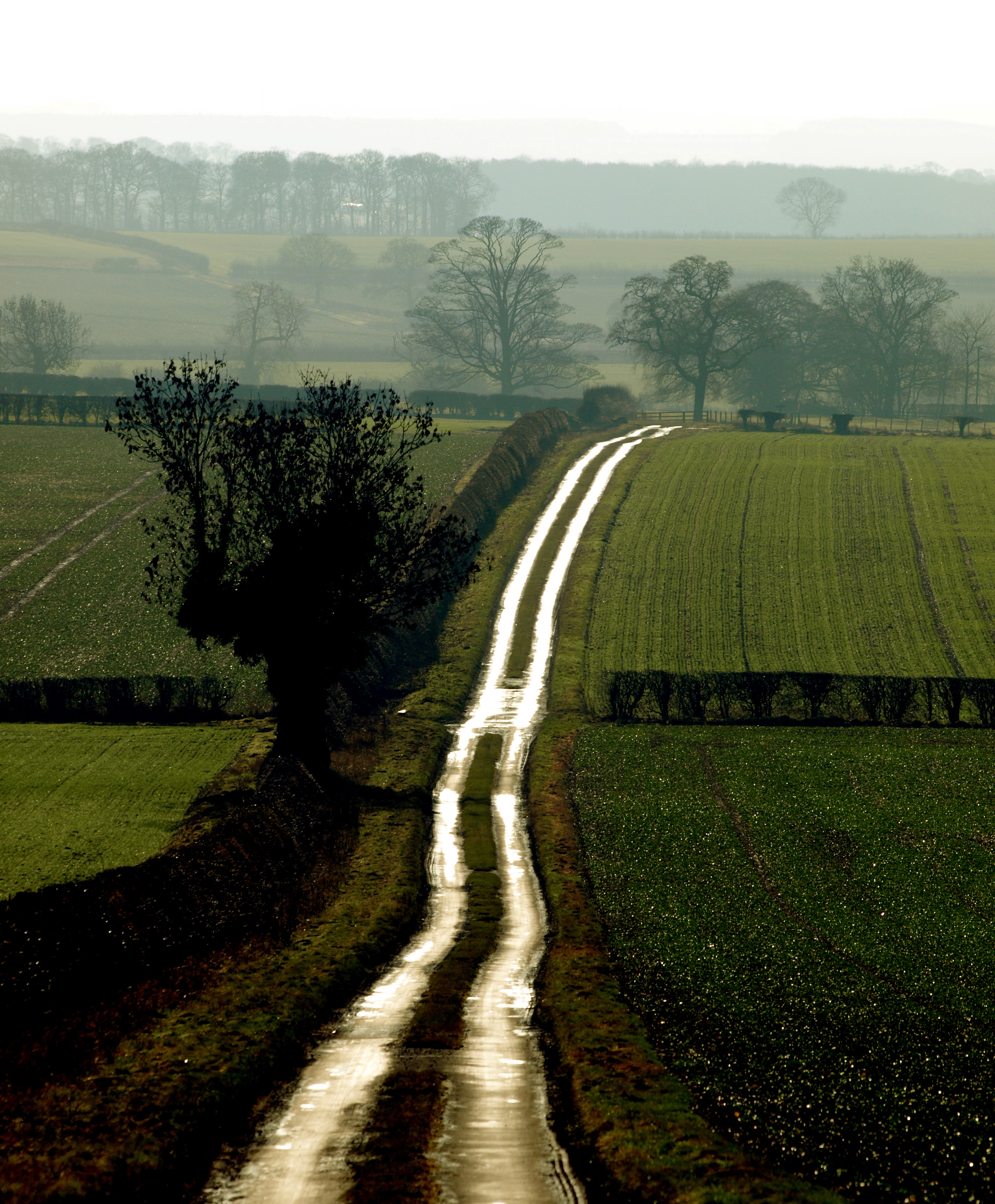
- The minor road through Bracken

- Location within the East Riding of Yorkshire
- OS grid reference: SE982508
  - London: 166 mi (267 km) S
- Civil parish: Watton
- Unitary authority: East Riding of Yorkshire
- Ceremonial county: East Riding of Yorkshire
- Region: Yorkshire and the Humber
- Country: England
- Sovereign state: United Kingdom
- Post town: DRIFFIELD
- Postcode district: YO25
- Dialling code: 01377
- Police: Humberside
- Fire: Humberside
- Ambulance: Yorkshire
- UK Parliament: Beverley and Holderness

Bracken or Bracken on the Wolds is a manor and hamlet in the civil parish of Watton, in the East Riding of Yorkshire, England. It is situated in the Yorkshire Wolds, about 1 mile (2 km) north-west of Kilnwick and 2 miles (3 km) north-east of Middleton on the Wolds. It lies less than 1 mile (2 km) east of the A614 road.

It was formerly a larger village with a chapel and garth, both of which were demolished by 1573, with the graveyard remaining. Since the 19th century, it has consisted of several rural estates: Horn Hill Farm, Bracken Fold, Bracken Farm and Bracken Burrows.

There are woodlands, walking paths, manorial waste and two streams that lie within its boundary: Bracken Beck in the south and an unnamed tributary of Cawkeld Sinks (a small lake in nearby Kilnwick) in the east. A section of the Minster Way crosses through the manor centre, from the south-east near Wedding Wood in Kilnwick to its northern boundary.

== History ==
=== Viking and Anglo-Saxon England ===
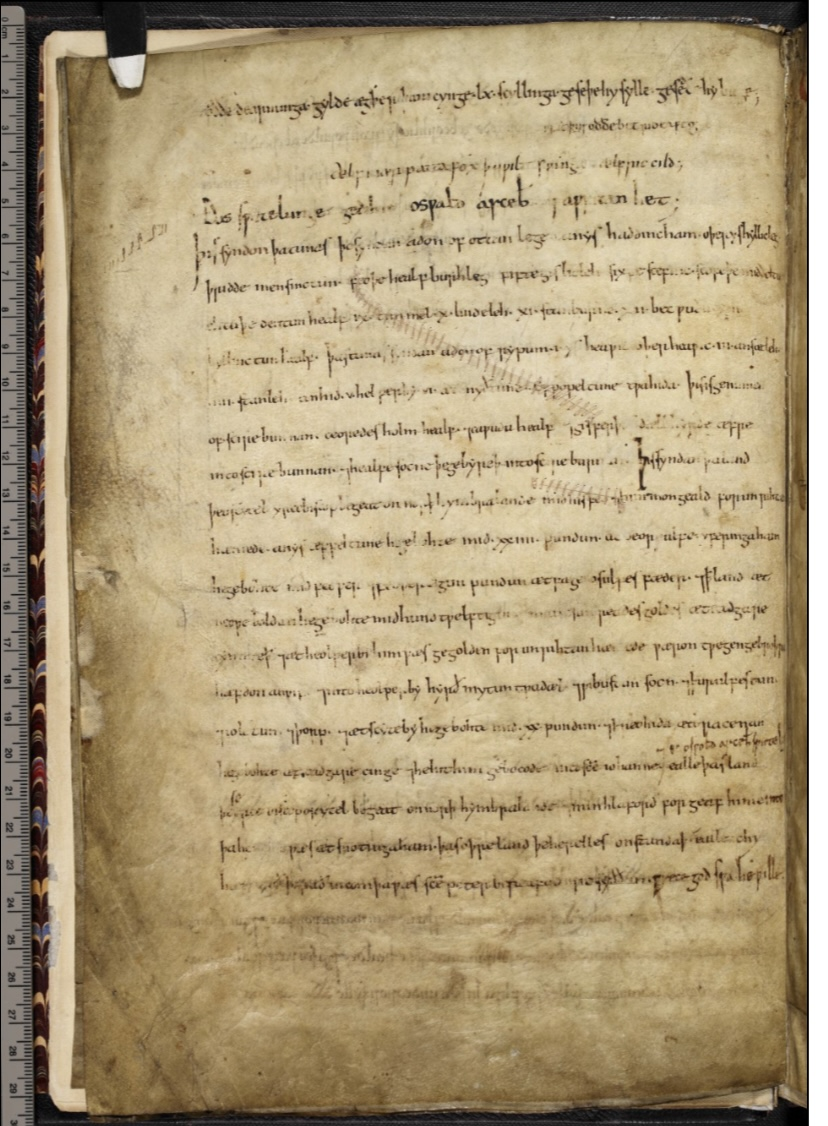
Bracenan recorded in St. Oswald's memorandum on line 18

In 954 King Eadred deposed Eric Bloodaxe as King of Northumbria and took control of the Danelaw. By May 957 his nephew, King Edgar the Peaceful, had seized final control from the remaining Danes and the estate of Bracken along with it. The Anglo-Scandinavian estate was afterwards held directly by Edgar while King of Mercia, before his accession to the throne of England. It can be surmised that Bracken changed hands to the See of York around 958, when Edgar had given another estate at Sutton to Oscytel, Archbishop of York. However, in the instance of Bracken, the estate had been purchased from the King. This conformed with a policy initiated by Edgar's elder brother, Eadwig, of strengthening control over Viking settled areas by granting land within them to the archbishop, who was of Danish descent in this event.

At the time of the Earldom of York in 972 the estate was recorded as "Bracenan" in a memorandum on the estates of the See of York by the Benedictine archbishop St. Oswald of Worcester, a kinsman of Oscytel, which read: " . . . þreo hida æt Bracenan he gebohte æt Eadgare cinge . . . "

=== Norman England ===
The manor was listed as "Brachen" in the Domesday Book in 1086, where it is recorded as "Brachen: Erneis de Buron".

By 1118 the majority of the former estates of Erneis de Buron had been granted to Geoffrey FitzPayne Trussebut, who later founded the Augustinian Warter Priory in 1132. After Geoffrey's death, his lands were initially seized for a period of time by King Stephen of Blois and many of his lands were granted to Ranulf de Gernon, 4th Earl of Chester around 1142. The lands were eventually returned to Geoffrey's grandson, William Trussebut the Younger, Lord of Warter and were afterwards known as the Trussebut Fee. His eldest son, Geoffrey, and second son, Robert, each held the manor successively – both dying without issue. The Trussebut Fee was then partitioned between their three sisters Rohese, Hilary and Agatha in 1194.

A Yorkshire charter of 1194 recorded the manor as a Knight's fee allotted to Agatha Trussebut. She was married to William d'Aubigny, Lord of Belvoir, one of the senior Sureties of King John I's Magna Carta. When Agatha died in 1247, lordship of Bracken passed to her daughter, Isabel d'Aubigny, who had married Sir Robert de Ros, Lord of Helmsley, the great-grandson of William the Lion, King of Scots. De Ros, whose forebear had assumed the arms of Trussebut of Warter, further inherited the entirety of the Trussebut Fee through his marriage to Isabel. Due in part to his grandfather's membership in the Order, Sir Robert remained a principal benefactor to the Knights Templar throughout his life – allowing the Order to benefit from a number of his manors.

=== Late Middle Ages ===
A collection at Berkeley Castle Archives provides the descent of the manor in the 13th & 14th centuries, recounted below:

"The manor was acquired by Samson Foliot in 1271–2 except for a holding of a croft and 2 bovates of land which was sold separately to him. When forfeited by the Contrariant Henry Lord Tyeys it was granted to Geoffrey le Scrope in May 1322 (at first for life but then to him and his heirs in July), and probably remained in his hands until Feb. 1329 when he was granted an Exchequer annuity in its place. It then passed to Tyeys's sister Alice and was inherited by her son Gerard de Lisle on her death in 1347. In 1350 Gerard exonerated the sheriff of Yorkshire for profits of the manor taken by the sheriff since Alice's death, and he held it at his death in 1360. It was granted to his widow Elizabeth (d. 1362) in dower, with half of the manors of Kingston Lisle and Fawler, in exchange for those of Mundford, Fritwell and Lydiard Tregoze, which had originally been assigned to her. Warin was described as lord of Bracken in 1364."

A 1415 Knight's fee in Bracken was held by the widow of Roger Scrope, 2nd Baron Scrope of Bolton and an enfeoffment of 1439 records John, Lord de Scrope.

=== Tudor to Stuart period ===
Later in 1535 John Scrope, 8th Baron Scrope of Bolton was noted to have collected rent for the manor. Bracken Chapel, the founding of which is unattested, was demolished by 1573 while under the patronage of Henry Scrope, 9th Baron Scrope of Bolton. The manor was held by the Barons of Bolton until the death of Emanuel Scrope, 1st Earl of Sunderland and 11th Baron of Bolton, who had been raised to the Earldom of Sunderland in 1627. After his death in 1630, his eldest daughter Mary inherited Bracken. She later married Charles Paulet, 1st Duke of Bolton, at the time 6th Marquess of Winchester, in 1655. The manor passed in 1699 to their daughter Jane, who married John Egerton, 3rd Earl of Bridgewater.

=== Georgian to Victorian era ===
Accounts of the Bridgewater Estate in 1748 note rent being taken in Bracken, presumably for John Egerton, Bishop of Durham. His daughter, Amelia Egerton, Lady Hume, inherited the manor following his death in 1787. In 1798 Sir Abraham Hume, 2nd Baronet and Amelia had the estate of Bracken surveyed by Ralph Burton. It was found to contain 660 acres, 2 roods and 17 perches of demesne land.

Samuel Lewis described the manor in the late 1850s as containing 33 inhabitants on the Beverley-Malton road and consisting of about 600 acres. In prior years the village had been large enough to merit a chapel whose cemetery was undisturbed.

As part of the estate of John Egerton, Viscount Alford, the manor passed to his eldest son John Egerton-Cust, 2nd Earl Brownlow in 1863. It then passed to the second son Adelbert Brownlow-Cust, 3rd Earl Brownlow when he succeeded in the Earldom of Brownlow and Viscountcy of Alford on the death of his elder brother in 1867.

In 1894–95 the manor was recorded in The Comprehensive Gazetteer of England & Wales as having 35 people living on 677 acres.

In 1866 Bracken became a separate civil parish, on 1 April 1935 the parish was abolished and merged with Watton. In 1931 the parish had a population of 25.

=== Present day ===
Lord Brownlow died without heirs in 1921 with the earldom and viscountcy becoming extinct. An indenture in 1923 recorded the transfer of the manor to the Rev. Dr. Robert Edleston, Baron de Montalbo. The Law of Property Act of 1925 abolished copyhold throughout the United Kingdom, which subsequently forced the conversion of existing tenures to freehold. In 1953 the lordship was inherited by Edleston's sister, Sarah Edleston. In 1969 it was vested in the Hanby Holmes family who held the title, demesne land and manorial rights until they were later passed by deed of conveyance to the Grierson family in 2023, just prior to the coronation of King Charles III.

== Lordship ==
The feudal lordship is held by Charles and Nora Grierson, 40th Lord and Lady of Bracken. The manorial land and rights remain appendant to the title.

== See also ==
- Feudalism in England
- Landed gentry
- Manorial court
