= Ousethorpe =

Hamlet in the East Riding of Yorkshire, England

Coordinates: 53.952675°N 0.762312°W

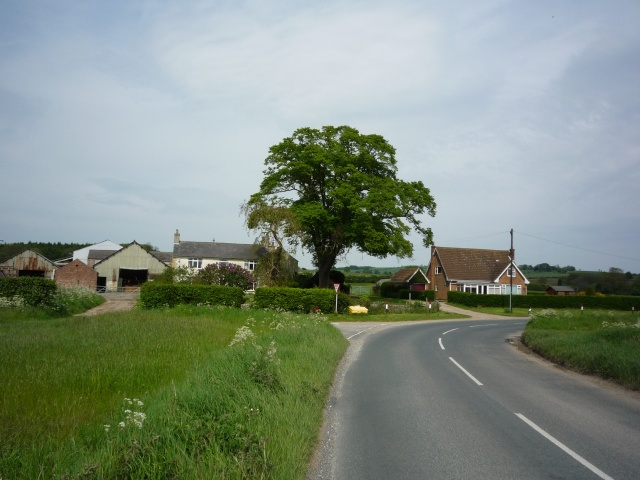
- Ousethorpe farm

- Location within the East Riding of Yorkshire
- OS grid reference: SE813514
- Civil parish: Millington
- Unitary authority: East Riding of Yorkshire
- Ceremonial county: East Riding of Yorkshire
- Region: Yorkshire and the Humber
- Country: England
- Sovereign state: United Kingdom
- Post town: YORK
- Postcode district: YO42
- Dialling code: 01759
- Police: Humberside
- Fire: Humberside
- Ambulance: Yorkshire
- UK Parliament: Bridlington and The Wolds

Ousethorpe is a small hamlet in the civil parish of Millington, in the East Riding of Yorkshire, England. It is situated approximately 1.5 miles (2.4 km) north of Pocklington.

== History ==
The name Ousethorpe derives from the Old English personal name Eanwulf and the Old Norse þorp meaning 'secondary settlement'. Eanwulf was later shortened or changed to Ulf.

Ousethorpe was formerly a township in the parish of Pocklington, in 1866 Ousethorpe became a separate civil parish, on 1 April 1935 the parish was abolished to form Millington. In 1931 the parish had a population of 13.

Ousethorpe medieval settlement is a scheduled monument which was designated on 22 October 1998.
