= All Saints' Church, North Dalton =

Church in North Dalton, East Riding of Yorkshire, England

Coordinates: 53°57′27″N 0°34′38″W

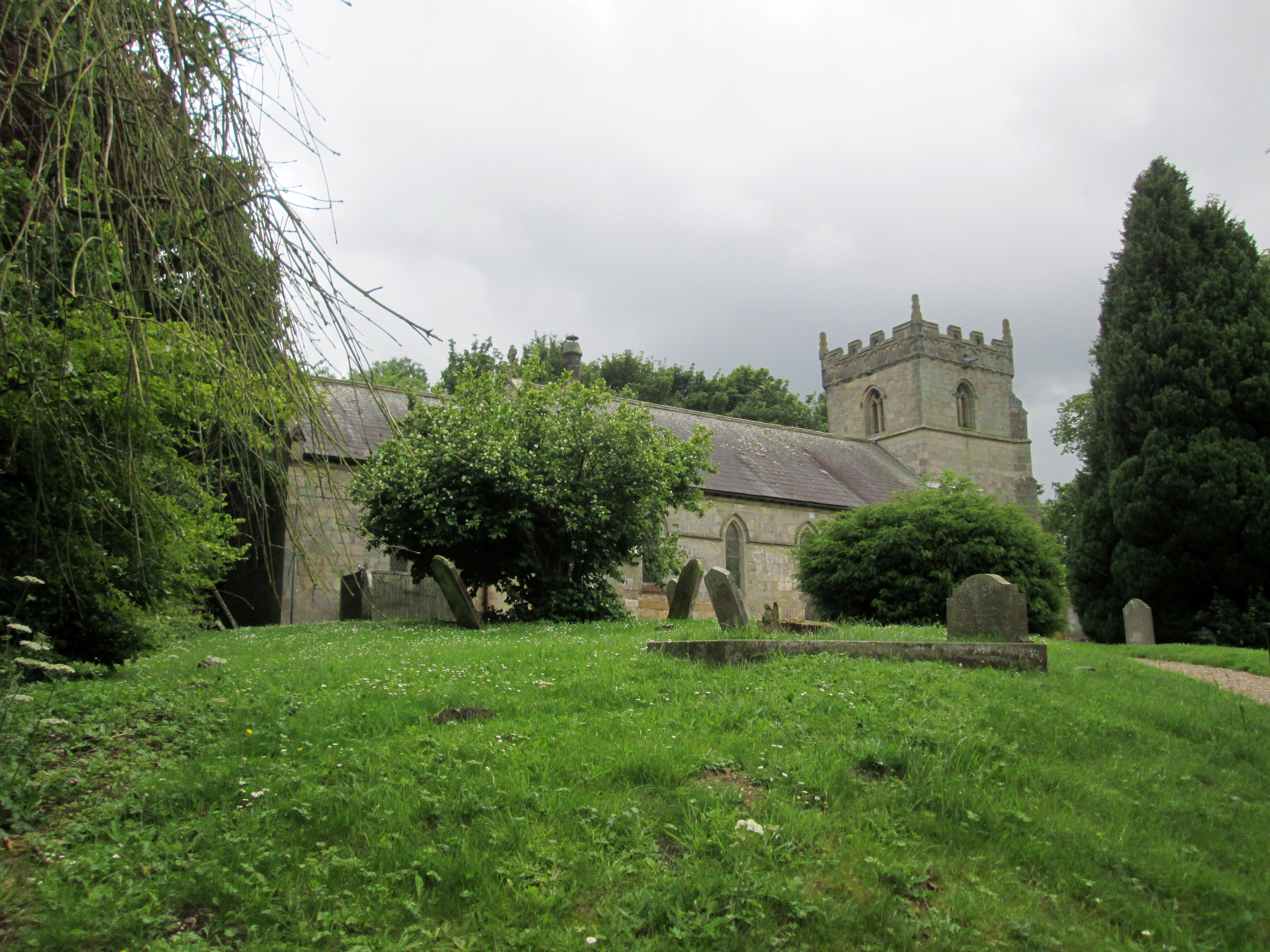
The church, in 2020

All Saints' Church is the parish church of North Dalton, a village in the East Riding of Yorkshire, in England.

The church was built in the 12th century, from which period the nave survives. The chancel was added early in the 13th century, and the tower was built in the 15th century. The church was restored in 1821 and between 1872 and 1874. The building was grade II* listed in 1966.

The church is built of stone with slate roofs, and consists of a nave, a chancel and a west tower. The tower has three stages, a moulded plinth, diagonal buttresses, moulded string courses, a two-light pointed west window, pointed two-light bell openings with hood moulds, and a cusped running scroll under a pierced embattled parapet with corner pinnacles. The south door is Norman with three orders, and attached shafts with decorated capitals. Inside, there is a pre-Norman Conquest carved stone built into the west wall, and a tub font which is probably 13th century.

== See also ==
- Grade II* listed buildings in the East Riding of Yorkshire
- Listed buildings in North Dalton
