= Church of St Edith, Bishop Wilton =

Anglican church in the East Riding of Yorkshire, England

Church of St Edith
- The Queen of the Wolds (Note: The Church of St James, in Louth, Lincolnshire, is also labelled as the Queen of the Wolds. Both Lincolnshire and the East Riding of Yorkshire have a small range of hills and valleys known as The Wolds.)
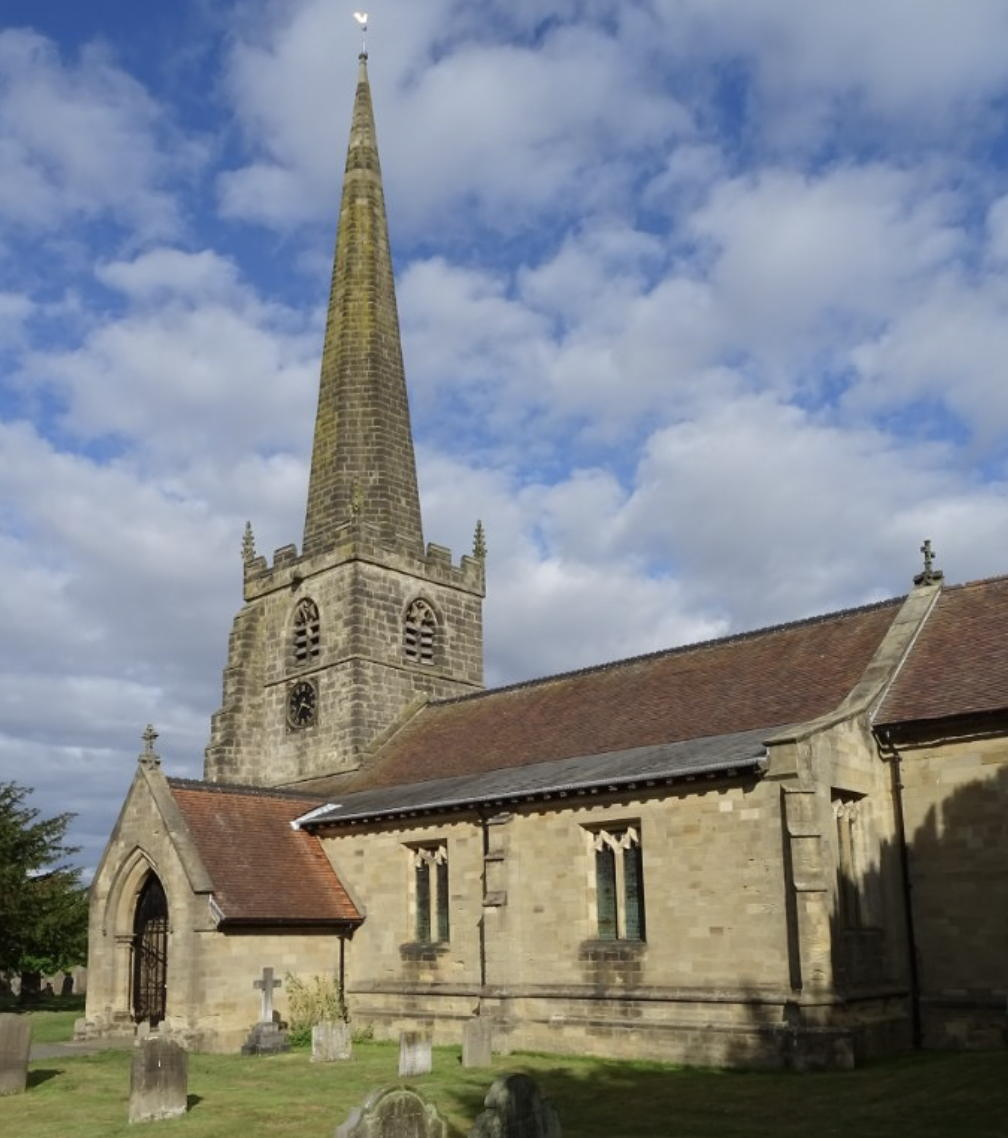
- Church of St Edith
- Church of St Edith
- 53.986°N 0.784°W
- OS grid reference: SE798552
- Location: Bishop Wilton, East Riding of Yorkshire
- Country: England
- Denomination: Anglican

History
- Status: Parish church
- Dedication: St Edith
- Other dedication: St Michael

Architecture
- Functional status: Active

Administration
- Diocese: Diocese of York
- Archdeaconry: York
- Deanery: South Wold
- Benefice: Garrowby Hill
- Parish: Bishop Wilton

Listed Building – Grade I
- Designated: 26 January 1967
- Reference no.: 1083868

The Church of St Edith is a grade I listed Anglican church in the village of Bishop Wilton, East Riding of Yorkshire, England. Although partly Norman, most of the church dates back to the 13th and 14th centuries, and it was extensively restored in the nineteenth century to a Gothic design by John Loughborough Pearson with funds provided by Sir Tatton Sykes. The church's spire is notable as a local landmark, and the Norman doorway on the south side is decorated with carvings that have been the subject of much study. The church is part of the Sykes Churches Trail, which extends throughout the eastern part of Yorkshire.

== History ==
The church lies on a bank in Bishop Wilton, with the main body of the church blocked from being viewed by the surrounding cottages, however, the spire is a local landmark and navigational point. The Domesday Book records a priest and a church in the settlement of Wiltone, but the name of Bishop Wilton was applied from the time of Edward the Confessor onwards, and in the 15th century, the archbishops of York had a palace in the village. The office of the archbishop of York held vast amounts of land in Yorkshire at the time of the Domesday survey, with Bishop Wilton accounting for 30 carucates and seven bovates. The arms of Archbishop Neville appear in one of the windows of the church, and Neville was the archbishop who had the palace built in the village.

There has been some archaeological evidence to suggest that a Saxon church existed at Bishop Wilton, although the present church has Norman origins. It is known that the land in and around Bishop Wilton was gifted to Archbishop Wulstanus around 939 AD by Athelstan, King of Northumbria. The bulk of the current building, the chancel, nave, aisles and transept, date from either the 13th or 14th century. However, a 19th-century restoration funded by Sir Tatton Sykes, and undertaken by John Loughborough Pearson, saw a great renovation of the church, with little of the original church left as it was, though many of the stones were re-used. Tiling was installed in 1902 under the direction of Temple Moore; though some tiles by Godwin date back to 1859 and were inspired by a design found in Jervaulx Abbey. The effect of the light streaming through the stained glass windows onto the decorated tiled floor, is said to be "mesmerising". Pevsner states that the hammerbeam roof over the nave is the work of Pearson, and that it, the tower roof, and aisle roofs are "prettily painted". These ceilings have been described as "beautifully decorated in gold and colour." The cost of these roofs alone was £700 (equivalent to £76,000 in 2025), and over 8,000 gold leaves were applied to the design during the renovations of 1859. Some of the floor tiles are black and white patterned with birds, said to have been influenced by a floor in St. Peter's Basilica in Rome. Nothing is known about the church before its restoration as only two accounts have been found detailing the church, and one of these has been determined to have been full of factual errors.

The church is also noted for its stained glass by Clayton and Bell of London at a cost of £1,000. The windows appear to show the story of the New Testament, along with notable figures in the church's history, such as St Edith, Sir Tatton Sykes, King Athelstan, St John of Beverley, and the arms of the Neville family. Other windows celebrate the lives of the Sykes family, benefactors of the church's renovation.

The tower is thought to be from the late 14th century and sits upon three pointed arches within the church, which are in turn supported by octagonal pillars, and the effect, according to Glynne, is it causes the observer to look to the west side of the church when inside. The placement of the tower being directly above the nave is unusual as it is normal for the tower to be an annexe at the end of the church. In 1931, the spire was restored (after several of the joints had been found to be defective), and this serves as a local landmark, even though the body of the church is hidden behind the houses of the village. The architecture of the tower is Perpendicular with buttresses, a three-light window on the west side, the spire is octagonal, and the whole edifice rises to 120 feet (37 m). The tower is fitted with three bells, which were renovated in 2022 after a National Lottery grant was afforded to the church.

The Norman doorway was paid for by Archbishop Grey, and the carved stones of the doorway were renovated during the 19th century coming in for some criticism as some of the stones were replaced. It is not known if the stones which were replaced were done so with new carvings based on the old design, or completely different designs altogether. The carvings show, among other things, a human head, beasts eating plants, a monkey playing on pipes (and another on a tambourine), a warrior with spear on horseback, a winged dragon, lions, and fish. Glynne described it as "...about the finest specimen of the many rich Norman doorways of the East Riding." Similarly, the chancel arch, which dates back to the 12th century, is adorned with carved stones, though not as varied in their designs as the doorway.

The church is now grade I listed, and Pevsner described it as "..a fascinating church, its history not fully cleared up."

=== Dedication ===
Mistakenly, in some texts, it labels the church as being dedicated to St Michael, but the church has been dedicated to St Edith since at least the 11th century. It is thought that the dedication to St Edith arose because she took holy orders at Wilton Abbey, when Bishop Ealdred, later the archbishop of York, was in charge at Wilton Abbey. Another root for the story of the church's dedication lay in a pilgrimage that the then Archbishop of York took in the 1050s to the Holy Land; his ship was wrecked in the Adriatic, and he was saved from death by St Edith. Only two other parish churches in England have a dedication to Edith of Wilton (Baverstock and Limpley Stoke, both in Wiltshire); all other dedications of St Edith in England have been determined to be Edith of Polesworth.

Another name for the church is the Queen of the Wolds.

== Churchyard ==
The churchyard contains two Commonwealth War Graves, both from the First World War, and in 1972, a soldier who had been shot by a sniper in Northern Ireland was interred there. In the churchyard just outside the south doorway, is a memorial to the dead from the village who served in the First World War.

== Parish and benefice ==
Historically, the church was in a peculiar of the Lay Manor of Wilton, and the Deanery of Harthill. Its entry in Liber Ecclesiasticus (a 19th-century encyclopedia of the church) shows it to be exempt under the diocesan listing. By 1242, it was listed as a prebendal church, associated with duties at York Minster. It is now in the parish of Bishop Wilton, part of the Benefice of Garrowby Hill, in the Deanery of South Wold, under the archdeaconry and the Diocese of York.

== See also ==
- Grade I listed buildings in the East Riding of Yorkshire
- Listed buildings in Bishop Wilton
