= Listed buildings in Millington, East Riding of Yorkshire =

Millington is a civil parish in the county of the East Riding of Yorkshire, England. It contains four listed buildings that are recorded in the National Heritage List for England. Of these, one is listed at Grade I, the highest of the three grades, one is at Grade II*, the middle grade, and the others are at Grade II, the lowest grade. The parish contains the village of Millington, the hamlet of Great Givendale, and the surrounding countryside. The listed buildings consist of two churches, and items in the churchyard of one of them.

== Key ==
| Grade | Criteria |
|---|---|
| I | Buildings of exceptional interest, sometimes considered to be internationally important |
| II* | Particularly important buildings of more than special interest |
| II | Buildings of national importance and special interest |

== Buildings ==
| Name and location | Photograph | Date | Notes | Grade |
|---|---|---|---|---|
| St Margaret's Church; 53.95621°N 0.73622°W | | 12th century | The church has been altered and extended through the centuries, the tower was added in 1824, and the church was restored in 1882–83 by Temple Moore. It is built in stone, with red brick in the porch, yellow brick to the bell turret, and has a slate roof. The church consists of a nave, a south porch, a chancel, and a bell turret at the west end with round-headed louvered bell openings. The south door is Norman with three orders and attached columns. | I |
| Cross base 53.95608°N 0.73627°W | — | Medieval (probable) | The cross base is in the churchyard of St Margaret's Church, to the south of the church. It is in sandstone, and consists of a cubital block with a chamfer to the upper arris, and an oblong socket. | II |
| Cross base and shaft fragment 53.95610°N 0.73621°W | — | Late Medieval (probable) | The cross base and shaft fragment are in the churchyard of St Margaret's Church, to the south of the church. They are in sandstone, and consist of a cubital block, on which is the lower stone of a chamfered cross shaft. The upper surface has been incised for use as a sundial. | II |
| St Ethelburgh's Church, Great Givendale; 53.97461°N 0.76149°W | | 1849 | The church was rebuilt, incorporating older material. It is built in stone with a slate roof, and consists of a nave and a chancel, and on the west end is a twin bellcote. Some of the windows in the chancel date from the 13th century, and the chancel arch is Norman with three orders, attached shafts, and scalloped capitals with carved foliage and human faces. | II* |
