= North Dalton =

Village and civil parish in the East Riding of Yorkshire, England

Coordinates: 53°57′27″N 0°34′25″W

- Location within the East Riding of Yorkshire
- Population: 302 (2011 census)
- OS grid reference: SE936522
  - London: 170 mi (270 km) S
- Civil parish: North Dalton
- Unitary authority: East Riding of Yorkshire
- Ceremonial county: East Riding of Yorkshire
- Region: Yorkshire and the Humber
- Country: England
- Sovereign state: United Kingdom
- Post town: DRIFFIELD
- Postcode district: YO25
- Dialling code: 01377
- Police: Humberside
- Fire: Humberside
- Ambulance: Yorkshire
- UK Parliament: Bridlington and The Wolds

North Dalton is a village and civil parish in the East Riding of Yorkshire, England. It is situated approximately 6 miles (10 km) south-west of the town of Driffield and 8 miles (13 km) north-east of the town of Pocklington. 4 miles (6.4 km) to the north-west lies the village of Huggate. South Dalton lies some 4.5 miles (7 km) to the south-east, with villages in between. North Dalton itself lies on the B1246 road.

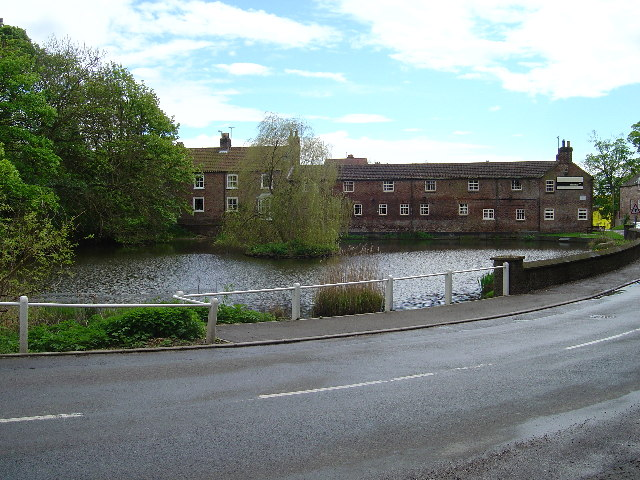
The village pond at North Dalton

According to the 2011 UK census, North Dalton parish had a population of 302, a reduction on the 2001 UK census figure of 315.

The name Dalton derives from the Old English dæltūn meaning 'settlement in a dale'.

The Anglican All Saints' Church, North Dalton was designated a Grade II* listed building in 1966 and is now recorded in the National Heritage List for England, maintained by Historic England.

In 1823 North Dalton was in the Wapentake of Harthill. All Saints was an episcopal chapel. There was also a Methodist chapel. Population was 398, with occupations including the landlady of The Star public house, a schoolmaster, a tailor, four farmers, and two blacksmiths, carpenters, corn millers, shoemakers and shopkeepers. A carrier operated between the village and Beverley once a week.

== See also ==
- Listed buildings in North Dalton
