= Garrowby Hill (painting) =

1998 painting by David Hockney

- Artist: David Hockney
- Year: 1998
- Medium: acrylic on canvas
- Dimensions: 152.4 cm × 190.5 cm (60.0 in × 75.0 in)
- Location: Museum of Fine Arts, Boston

Garrowby Hill is an acrylic on canvas painting by David Hockney, from 1998. It depicts the Yorkshire-landmark of the same name. The painting is held at the Museum of Fine Arts, in Boston.

== Painting ==
The painting was completed in 1998. Hockney had spent a number of years living in Los Angeles before moving back to his native Yorkshire in the late 1990s. Following the move back to England, Hockney completed several landscape paintings of Yorkshire scenery, one of which was Garrowby Hill. Hockney completed this painting in Yorkshire due to him being there when his mother was unwell.

The painting is of the tallest point in the Yorkshire Wolds, which is the highest point of Bishop Wilton Wold and given its name due to the proximity to the village of Garrowby, near York.

In 2017, around the time of several major retrospective exhibitions, Hockney painted a new version, sometimes called the purple road version.

== Exhibitions ==
It was displayed as part of Hockney's 2017 retrospective at Tate Britain in London.
