= Bishop Wilton Wold =

Marilyn peak in England

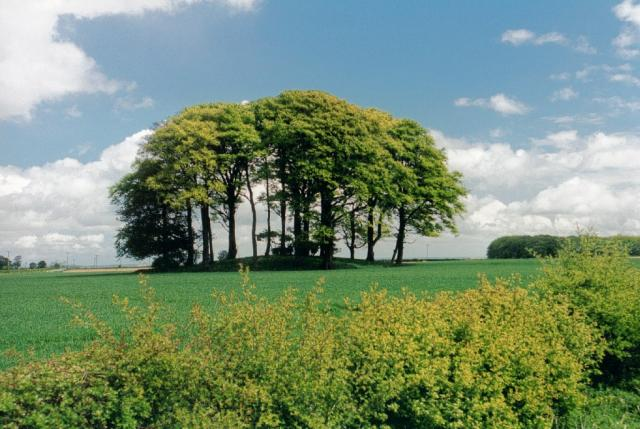
- The summit

Highest point
- Elevation: 248 m (814 ft)
- Prominence: c. 203 m
- Listing: Marilyn, County Top
- Coordinates: 54°00′06″N 0°45′02″W

Geography
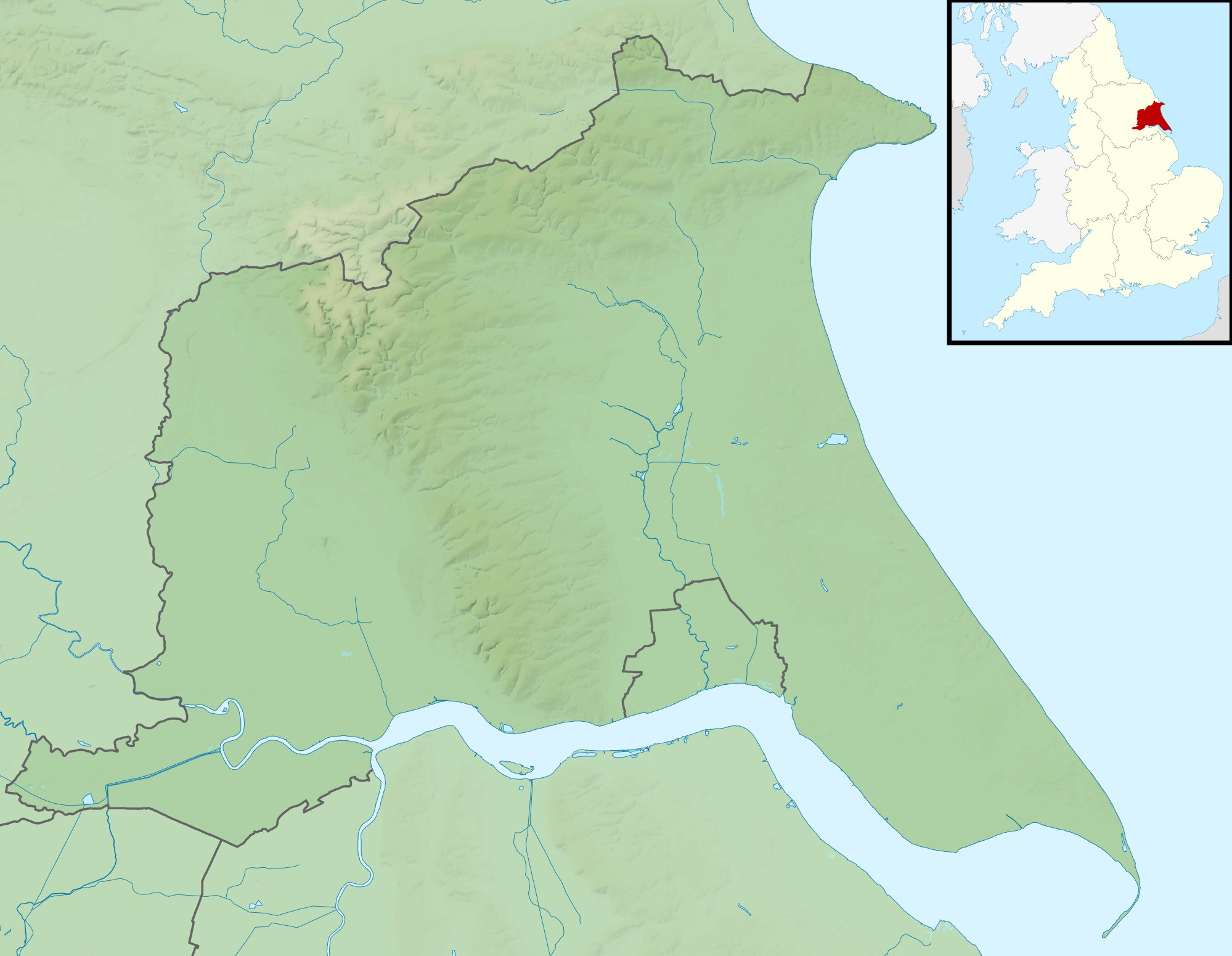
- Location within East Riding of Yorkshire
- Location: Yorkshire Wolds, England
- OS grid: SE820569
- Topo map: OS Landranger 106

Bishop Wilton Wold is the highest point of the Yorkshire Wolds in the East Riding of Yorkshire, England. The summit, known as Garrowby Hill, lies about five miles (eight kilometres) north of Pocklington.

As with most of the wolds, it is wide, flat and agricultural in nature. The A166 road passes right by the top. However, it is a Marilyn (having topographic prominence of at least 150 m or 492 ft 2 in). There is a trig point, two covered reservoirs and an aerial.

Topography detailed from LIDAR info, in the database of British Hills, gives the summit as 247.9 metres (813 ft) on the tumulus north of the A166 road just to the east of the 246-metre (807 ft) OS map height given for the triangulation pillar that is within the reservoir. The prominence is 207.2m with col of 40.7m at TA 1103 7869 as detailed in the database of British Hills.

The British artist David Hockney painted the view from the summit of Garrowby Hill in 1998.

== Halifax bomber crash 1944 ==
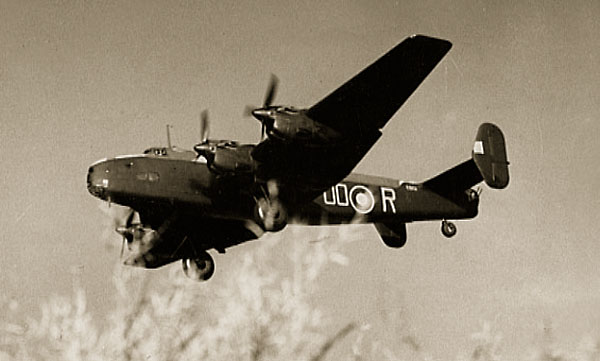
Halifax bomber OO-R of 1663 HCU

Around 10 am on 7 February 1944 a Halifax MkV DK192 (OO-N) from 1663 HCU based at RAF Rufforth crashed on Garrowby Hill.

As well as the 7 aircrew who were on a training flight, a passing lorry driver was also killed. There is a memorial in a layby on the A166 at Garrowby Hill

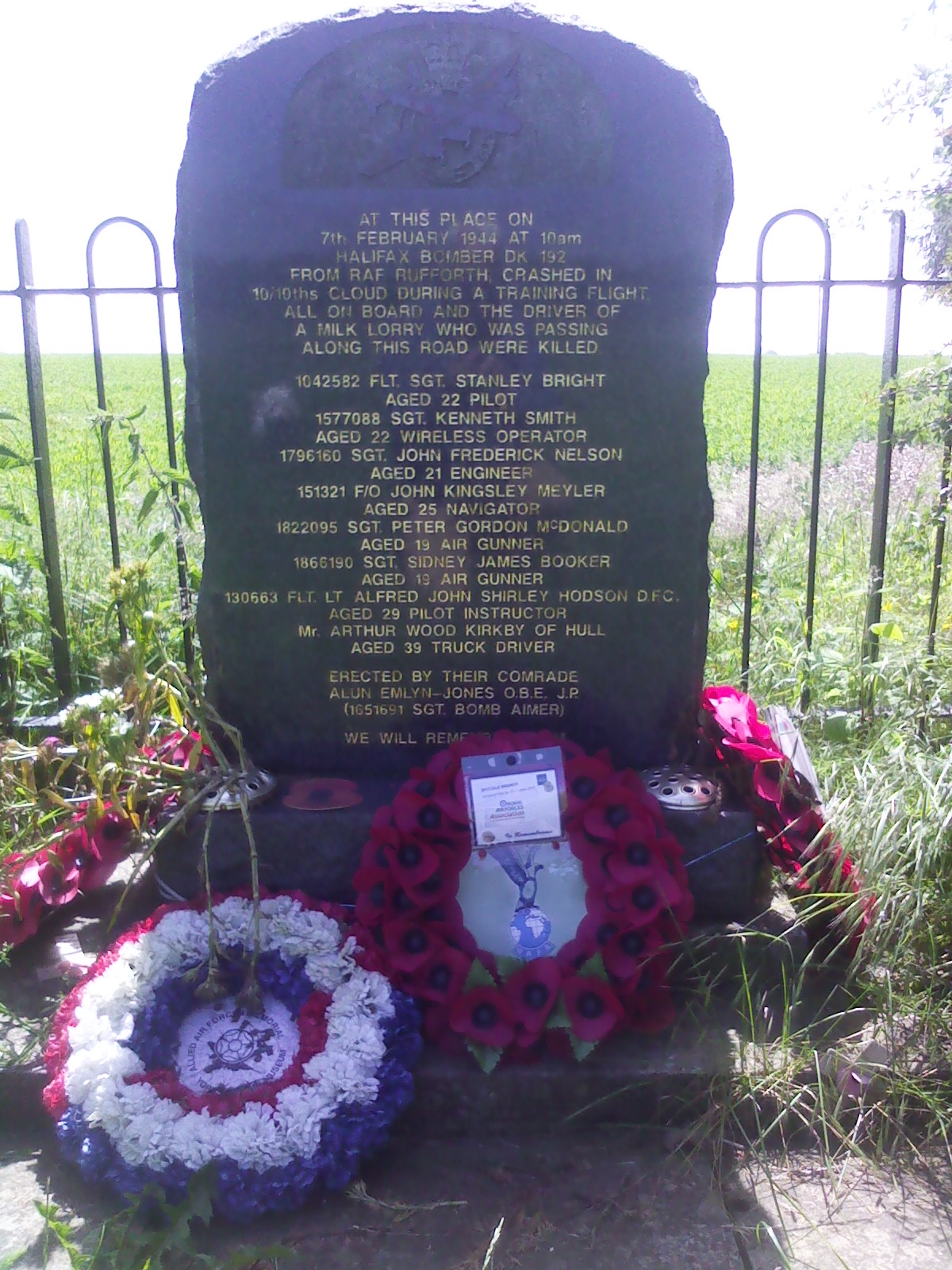
Memorial to the men killed in 1944
