= Millington, East Riding of Yorkshire =

Village in the East Riding of Yorkshire, England

Coordinates: 53°57′19″N 0°44′07″W

Millington
- Location within the East Riding of Yorkshire
- Population: 242 (2011 census)
- OS grid reference: SE830517
  - London: 170 mi (270 km) S
- Civil parish: Millington
- Unitary authority: East Riding of Yorkshire
- Ceremonial county: East Riding of Yorkshire
- Region: Yorkshire and the Humber
- Country: England
- Sovereign state: United Kingdom
- Post town: YORK
- Postcode district: YO42
- Dialling code: 01759
- Police: Humberside
- Fire: Humberside
- Ambulance: Yorkshire
- UK Parliament: Bridlington and The Wolds

Millington is a small village and civil parish in the East Riding of Yorkshire, England. It is situated approximately 2 miles (3.2 km) north-east of Pocklington.

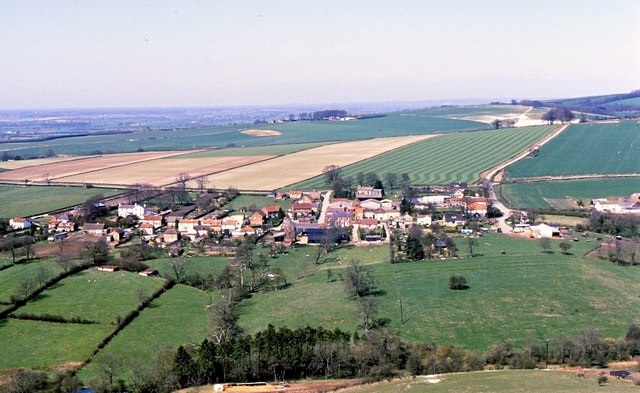
Looking down on Millington from the Yorkshire Wolds Way

The civil parish is formed by the village of Millington and the hamlets of Great Givendale and Ousethorpe. According to the 2011 UK census, Millington parish had a population of 242, an increase on the 2001 UK census figure of 217.

Nearby is Millington Woods and Millington Pastures. Millington Woods is one of the few remaining wooded dales in the Yorkshire Wolds. The woods includes Millington Springs, which formerly supported beds of watercress. Millington Pastures holds a stock of highland cattle, and is used for bike riding and walking.

The name Millington derives from the Old English mylntūn meaning 'mill settlement'.

The church dedicated to St Margaret was designated a Grade I listed building in 1967 and is now recorded in the National Heritage List for England, maintained by Historic England.

Millington has a public house called The Gait Inn and also a licensed restaurant and tea room called The Ramblers Rest.

The Yorkshire Wolds Way National Trail, a long distance footpath passes through the parish, to the east of the village.

In 1823 Millington was a village and civil parish in the Wapentake of Harthill and the Liberty of St Peter's. The ecclesiastical parish living was under the patronage of the Dean of York. Population at the time was 282. Occupations included three farmers, a blacksmith, a wheelwright, a corn miller, a shopkeeper, and the landlord of The Gate public house. Resident were a school master, the parish vicar, and a gentleman.

== See also ==
- Listed buildings in Millington, East Riding of Yorkshire
