= Bishop Wilton =

Village and civil parish in the East Riding of Yorkshire, England

Coordinates: 53.985858°N 0.785959°W

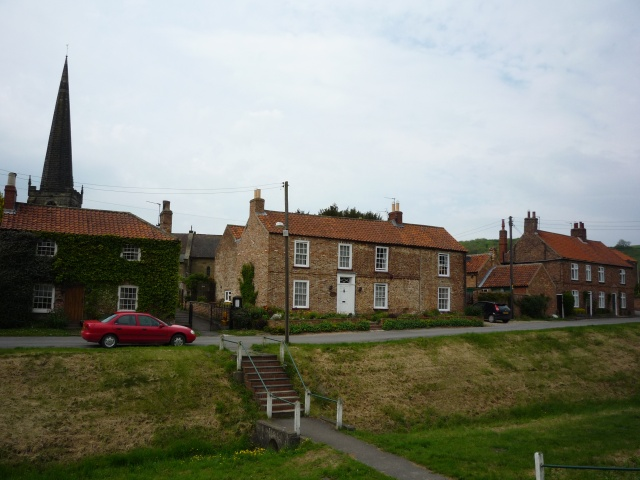
- Bishop Wilton

- Location within the East Riding of Yorkshire
- Population: 554 (2011 census)
- OS grid reference: SE797551
  - London: 170 mi (270 km) S
- Civil parish: Bishop Wilton
- Unitary authority: East Riding of Yorkshire
- Ceremonial county: East Riding of Yorkshire
- Region: Yorkshire and the Humber
- Country: England
- Sovereign state: United Kingdom
- Post town: YORK
- Postcode district: YO42
- Dialling code: 01759
- Police: Humberside
- Fire: Humberside
- Ambulance: Yorkshire
- UK Parliament: Bridlington and The Wolds

Bishop Wilton is a small village and civil parish in the East Riding of Yorkshire, England. It is situated approximately 4 miles (6 km) north of Pocklington and 6 miles (10 km) east of Stamford Bridge.

The civil parish is formed by the village of Bishop Wilton and the hamlets of Gowthorpe and Youlthorpe. According to the 2011 UK census, Bishop Wilton parish had a population of 554 in 227 households, an increase on the 2001 UK census figure of 500 in 199 households. Just north of the village lies Bishop Wilton Wold, more commonly referred to as Garrowby Hill. At 808 feet (246 m) above sea level, it is the highest point on the Yorkshire Wolds.

The name Wilton derives from the Old English wiligtūn meaning 'settlement by the willows'. In medieval times, the town was held by the Archbishops of York.

Through the centre of Bishop Wilton runs a shallow beck, flanked on both sides by open grass verges. Around the village there are walks on the Wolds with views across the Vale of York.

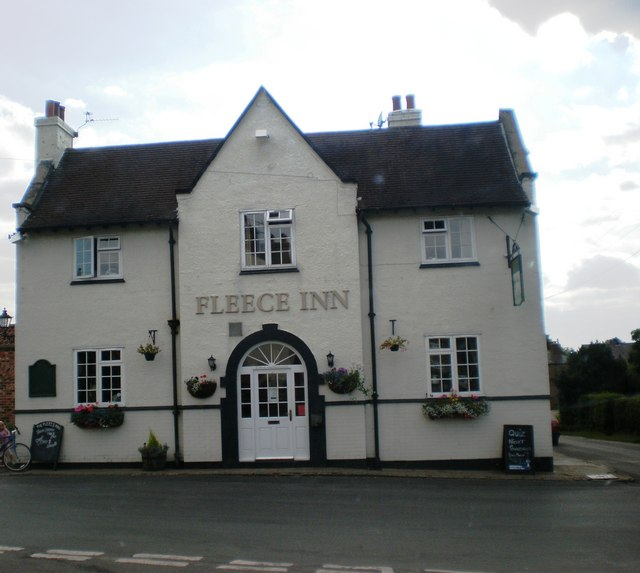
The Fleece Inn

The village has a community-run shop, which opened in 2020, a small primary school, an art gallery with screen printing workshop, and the Fleece Inn public house.

== Church ==
St Edith's, the medieval Church of England parish church, is dedicated to Edith of Wilton. The church was restored in 1858–59 with internal embellishment to designs by J. L. Pearson. It was designated a Grade I listed building in January 1967 and is now recorded in the National Heritage List for England, maintained by Historic England. The church is on the Sykes Churches Trail devised by the East Yorkshire Churches Group.

In 2024, the village was named one of the "best secret villages" in the UK to live in by The Times newspaper.

== See also ==
- Listed buildings in Bishop Wilton
