= Youlthorpe =

Hamlet in the East Riding of Yorkshire, England

Coordinates: 53.990091°N 0.831212°W

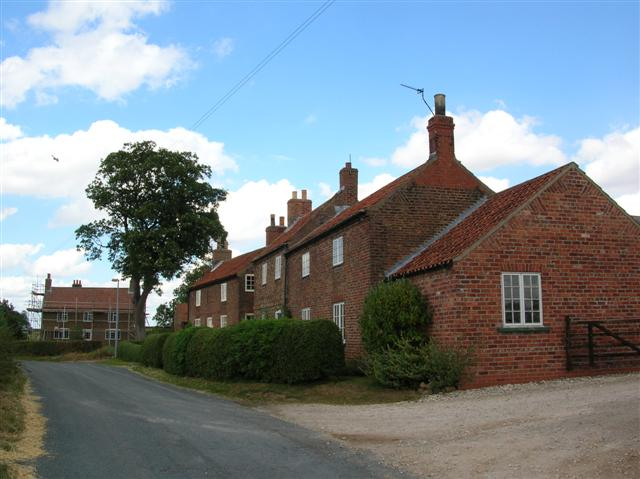
- Youlthorpe

- Location within the East Riding of Yorkshire
- OS grid reference: SE766556
- Civil parish: Bishop Wilton
- Unitary authority: East Riding of Yorkshire
- Ceremonial county: East Riding of Yorkshire
- Region: Yorkshire and the Humber
- Country: England
- Sovereign state: United Kingdom
- Post town: YORK
- Postcode district: YO41
- Dialling code: 01759
- Police: Humberside
- Fire: Humberside
- Ambulance: Yorkshire
- UK Parliament: Bridlington and The Wolds

Youlthorpe is a hamlet in the East Riding of Yorkshire, England. It forms part of the civil parish of Bishop Wilton. It is situated approximately 10 miles (16 km) east of York, 5 miles (8 km) north-west of Pocklington and just south of the main A166 road from York to Bridlington.

From 1886 Youlthorpe was part of the civil parish of Youlthorpe with Gowthorpe which was abolished on 1 April 1935 with the creation of the civil parish of Bishop Wilton.

East farmhouse in the settlement was designated a Grade II listed building in 1987 and is now recorded in the National Heritage List for England, maintained by Historic England.

The name Youlthorpe originally derived from the Old Norse Eyjulfrþorp meaning 'Eyjulfr's secondary settlement'. Eyjulfr was later replaced with another personal name, Jol.
