= Listed buildings in Garton =

Garton is a civil parish in the county of the East Riding of Yorkshire, England. It contains ten listed buildings that are recorded in the National Heritage List for England. Of these, one is listed at Grade I, the highest of the three grades, one is at Grade II*, the middle grade, and the others are at Grade II, the lowest grade. The parish contains the village of Garton on the Wolds, the hamlet of Elmswell and the surrounding countryside. The listed buildings consist of houses, a church, a grave slab in the churchyard, and a memorial tower.

== Key ==
Grade	Criteria
I	Buildings of exceptional interest, sometimes considered to be internationally important
II*	Particularly important buildings of more than special interest
II	Buildings of national importance and special interest

== Buildings ==
Name and location	Photograph	Date	Notes	Grade
St Michael's Church; 54.02062°N 0.50271°W		c.1132	The church has been altered and extended through the centuries. It is built in sandstone with a grey slate roof, and consists of a nave, a chancel with a north vestry, and a west tower. The tower has three stages, a stepped and chamfered plinth, clasping pilaster buttresses, a round-arched west entrance, slit and round-headed windows, two-light four-centred arched bell openings, clock faces, and an embattled parapet with stepped corner and central pinnacles. On the south front is a projecting gabled doorcase with a decorated round arch with four orders, and a decorated hood mould. Inside, there are 19th-century wall paintings.	I
Grave slab, St Michael's Church; 54.02054°N 0.50242°W	—	13th or 14th century	The grave slab is in the churchyard to the south of the church. It is in sandstone with a rectangular plan, measuring about 1.5 metres (4 ft 11 in) by 0.5 metres (1 ft 8 in), and has a carved head and feet.	II
Elmswell Old Hall; 54.00968°N 0.47879°W		1634	A large house that has been extended and is now derelict. It is in reddish-pink brick with a pantile roof. There are two storeys, and four bays, recessed on the left, and to the right is a single-storey single-bay range. The doorway has a fanlight, above it is a medieval carved female head in stone, and there is another doorway to the right. The windows are a mix; most are sashes, some of the others are mullioned, and some are casements.	II*
Ett Hem Manor House and Kirk View; 54.02224°N 0.50180°W	—	Mid 18th century	The house, later divided into two, is in pinkish brown brick on a plinth, with a wooden eaves cornice, and a pantile roof. There are two storeys and attics, seven bays, and a rear extension and outshut. Steps lead to the central entrance that has an eared architrave, a dentilled frieze and a hood, and there is another entrance at the rear. The windows are sashes alternating with blocked openings, on the ground floor under flat arches of rubbed brick, and on the upper floor under header arches. On the left gable end are horizontally sliding sash windows under elliptical arches.	II
Low Farmhouse; 54.02272°N 0.50435°W	—	c. 1795	The farmhouse is in pinkish-brown brick, with a stepped band, overhanging eaves and a hipped Welsh slate roof. There are two storeys and attics, and three bays. Near the centre of the front is a full-height round-headed projecting arch with imposts, containing a round-headed stair window on the upper floor. To the right is a doorway, and the windows on the lower two floors are sashes under flat arches of gauged brick. The attic contains horizontally siding sash windows.	II
Butcher's House and three houses 54.02272°N 0.50435°W	—	Late 18th to early 19th century	A row of four houses in brick with a pantile roof. There are two storeys, a front of seven bays, and the outer houses have a double depth plan. On the front are three doorways, the left two with rectangular fanlights, the right under a segmental arch. The windows are sashes, those on the ground floor with cambered arches.	II
Timber Farmhouse; 54.02249°N 0.50321°W	—	Late 18th to early 19th century (probable)	The farmhouse is in pinkish-brown brick on a plinth, with a four-course floor band, and a swept pantile roof. There are two storeys and attics, three bays, and a rear range. The central doorway has a rectangular fanlight, the windows are sashes, and all the openings have cambered heads.	II
West End House; 54.02327°N 0.50780°W	—	Early 19th century	The house is in pinkish-brown brick with a pantile roof. There are two storeys, a double range plan and two bays. Steps lead to the central doorway, the windows are horizontally sliding sashes, and the ground floor openings are under elliptical arches.	II
West End View; 54.02330°N 0.50789°W	—	Early 19th century	The house is in pinkish-brown brick with a pantile roof. There are two storeys, a double range plan and three bays. Steps lead to the doorway, the windows are horizontally sliding sashes, and the ground floor openings are under elliptical arches.	II
Sir Tatton Sykes Memorial Tower; 54.04358°N 0.53955°W		1865	The memorial tower is to Sir Tatton Sykes, and was designed by John Gibbs. It is in magnesium limestone and pinkish sandstone, and consists of a polychrome tower 120 feet (37 m) in height. It has a square plan, and is tapering, with three stages. The tower is highly ornamented, including bands, inscriptions, pinnacles, buttresses, and a relief of Sir Tatton on horseback. On the top is an octagonal spire with finials and a cross at the apex.	II
