= Church of St Michael and All Angels, Garton on the Wolds =

Church in the East Riding of Yorkshire, England

Church of St Michael and All Angels
- Church of St Michael and All Angels, Garton on the Wolds
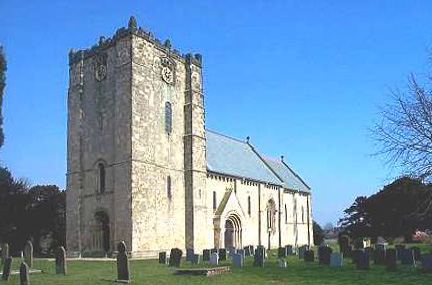
- "Quite exceptional Victorian decoration" – restored in memory of Sir Nickolaus Pevsner

- Location in the East Riding of Yorkshire
- 54.0206°N 0.5027°W
- OS grid reference: SE 98197 59328
- Location: Garton on the Wolds, East Riding of Yorkshire
- Country: England
- Denomination: Church of England

History
- Founded: 1132
- Dedication: Saint Michael

Architecture
- Heritage designation: Grade I
- Designated: 20 September 1966

Administration
- Diocese: Diocese of York

Clergy
- Vicar: Revd David Fletcher

The Church of St Michael and all Angels, Garton on the Wolds, in the East Riding of Yorkshire is a church of medieval origins that was built c.1132 for the prior of Kirkham Abbey. Long connected to the Sykes family of Sledmere, Sir Tatton Sykes, 4th Baronet engaged John Loughborough Pearson to undertake a major reconstruction of the building in 1856–1857. Sykes son, the fifth baronet, employed George Edmund Street to design a series of murals for interior decoration, depicting a range of bible stories. The murals, "dirty and decaying" when Nikolaus Pevsner recorded the church in his 1972 East Yorkshire volume for the Buildings of England series, were restored in 1985–1991 in Pevsner's memory by the Pevsner Memorial Trust.

The church remains an active parish church and is a Grade I listed building.

== History ==
Historic England gives a construction date for the church of c. 1132, noting that it was built for the prior of Kirkham Abbey. The architectural historian David Neave writes that the benefice was granted to the abbey by Walter Espec in 1121 and the church rebuilt shortly thereafter. Further work was undertaken in the 14th and 15th centuries, including the construction of the upper stage of the tower. By the 19th century, the church was in a state of dilapidation, and Sir Tatton Sykes the Fourth brought in J. L. Pearson to undertake a complete restoration in 1855–1857. Most of the existing building is his, with the exception of the tower and "two or three features". Sir Tatton Sykes the Fifth dismissed Pearson in 1865, and recruited G. E. Street to undertake the internal decoration. In total, Sykes expended some £150,000 on the building and restoration of Anglican churches on his Yorkshire estates. David Neave notes that, despite Sykes' prodigality, "the residents of Garton (remained) stubbornly Methodist".

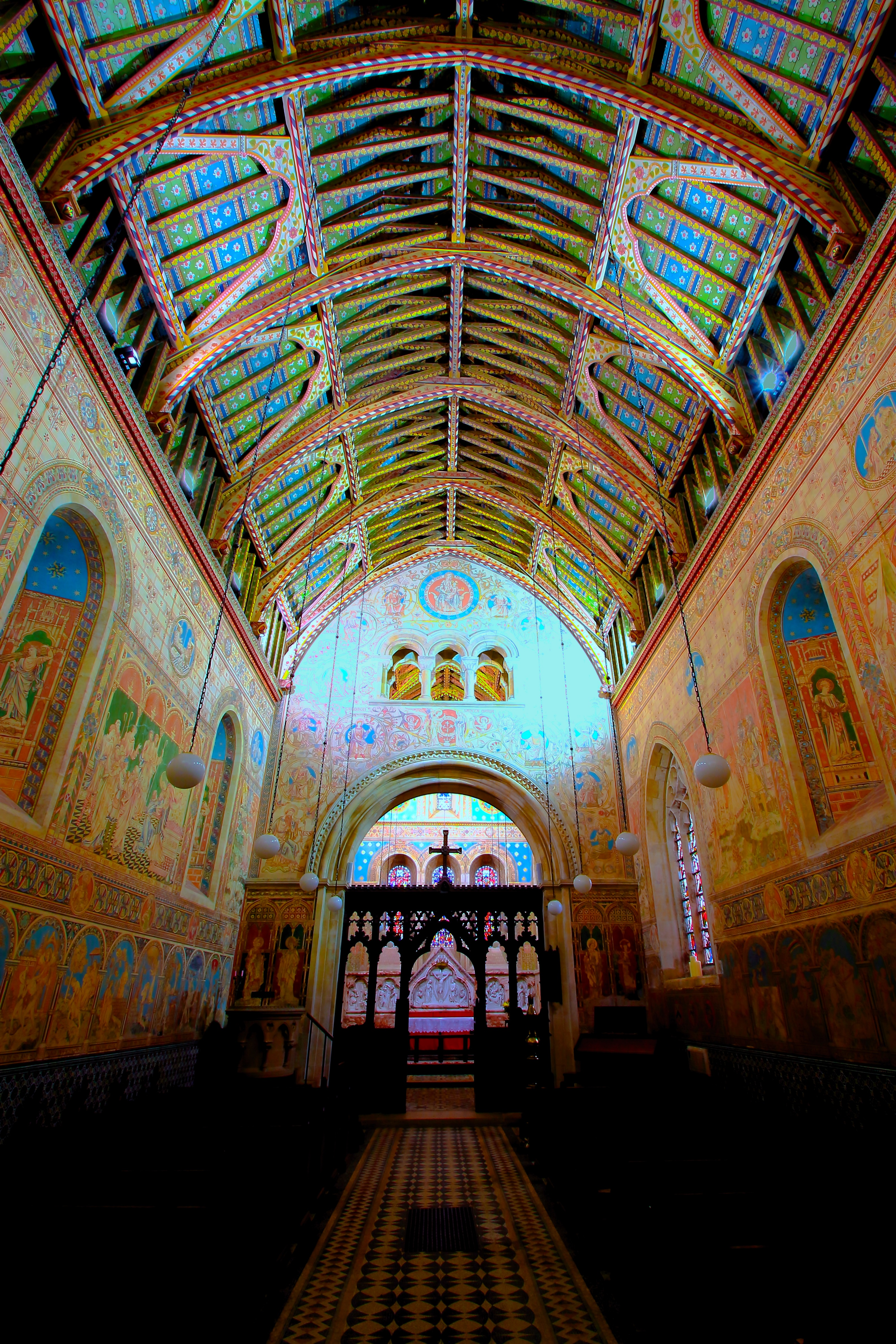
The church interior with decoration by Clayton & Bell

The Victorian wall murals were produced in 1865 by the notable firm of Clayton and Bell. They cover almost the entirety of the interior of the church and present a series of scenes from the bible. The total cost of the decoration was some £3,000. The mid-19th century was a period of great turbulence for the established church: the publication of Charles Darwin's On the Origin of Species, in 1859, had challenged orthodox thinking on the creation of the world. The historian Jill Allibone suggests that the murals were Sykes's, and his vicar's, rebuttal of Darwinian heresy.

Writing of the murals in his 1972 guide to York and the East Riding, when their condition was already "pitiful", Pevsner noted, "it is essential that they be preserved". By the time of Pevsner's death just over a decade later, the murals were "hideously disfigured by damp and dirt". A number of Pevsner's friends and colleagues had planned to raise a sum of money to fund a restoration project in his memory and the architectural historian John Newman chaired the fundraising committee, the Pevsner Memorial Trust. In Bridget Cherry and Simon Bradley's volume, The Buildings of England: A Celebration, he records how the committee identified the murals at St Michael and All Angels as a suitable project and worked to raise the £100,000 required. David Neave's 2005 revision to the guide records their restoration and preservation in 1986–1991.

The church remains an active parish church and holds regular services.

== Architecture and description ==
The church is built of sandstone ashlar. The first two storeys of the three-storey tower date from the original 12th century construction. The top storey is later, from the 15th century, in a Perpendicular style. The doorway, although in an Early Gothic style, is part of Pearson's rebuilding. The church has a number of significant examples of Romanesque carvings.

The murals in the nave depict scenes from the Old Testament, those in the chancel from the New. They are acknowledged as among the finest of Clayton and Bell's work. The stained glass is also by them, as are the painted roofs. The Cosmati paving in the chancel and nave is later, dating from Pearson's re-engagement in 1878. Pearson had seen examples of such work dating from the 12th century during his travels in Italy. Neave notes that it "has not worn well". The dado of tiles in a "Spanish" style, which runs under the murals, was manufactured by Frederick Garrard of Millwall at a cost of £166.

The church is a Grade I listed building.

== See also ==
- Grade I listed churches in the East Riding of Yorkshire
- Listed buildings in Garton

== Sources ==
- Allibone, Jill (1991). The Wallpaintings at Garton-On-The-Wolds. London: Pevsner Memorial Trust. ISBN 978-0-9518430-0-0. OCLC 940129105.
- Cherry, Bridget (1998). The Buildings of England, Ireland, Scotland and Wales: a short history and bibliography. Cambridge, UK: Penguin Collectors Society. ISBN 9780952740117. OCLC 906994306.
- Bridget Cherry; Simon Bradley, eds. (2001). The Buildings of England: a Celebration. Beccles, Suffolk: Penguin Collectors Society. ISBN 9780952740131. OCLC 1000974968.
- Goodall, John (2015). Parish Church Treasures: The Nation's Greatest Art Collection. London: Bloomsbury Publishing. ISBN 9781472917652.
- Harries, Susie (2011). Nikolaus Pevsner - The Life. London: Chatto & Windus. ISBN 9780701168391.
- Jenkins, Simon (1999). England's Thousand Best Churches. London: Penguin Books. ISBN 978-0-14-103930-5. OCLC 247852200.
- Pevsner, Nikolaus (1972). Yorkshire: York and the East Riding. The Buildings of England. Harmsworth, Middlesex: Penguin Books. OCLC 883012667.
- Pevsner, Nikolaus; Neave, David (2005). Yorkshire: York and the East Riding. The Buildings of England. New Haven, US & London, UK: Yale University Press. ISBN 9780300095937. OCLC 155722128.
- Schultheiss, Petra (2018). Like an Ancient Shrine: Mid-19th Century Architectural Theory, the Memorial Mosaics for Prince Albert and the Queen Victoria's Position as Female Sovereign. Georg Olms Verlag. ISBN 9783487155401.
