= Sir Tatton Sykes Memorial Tower =

Memorial in Garton, East Riding of Yorkshire, England

Coordinates: 54°02′37″N 0°32′22″W

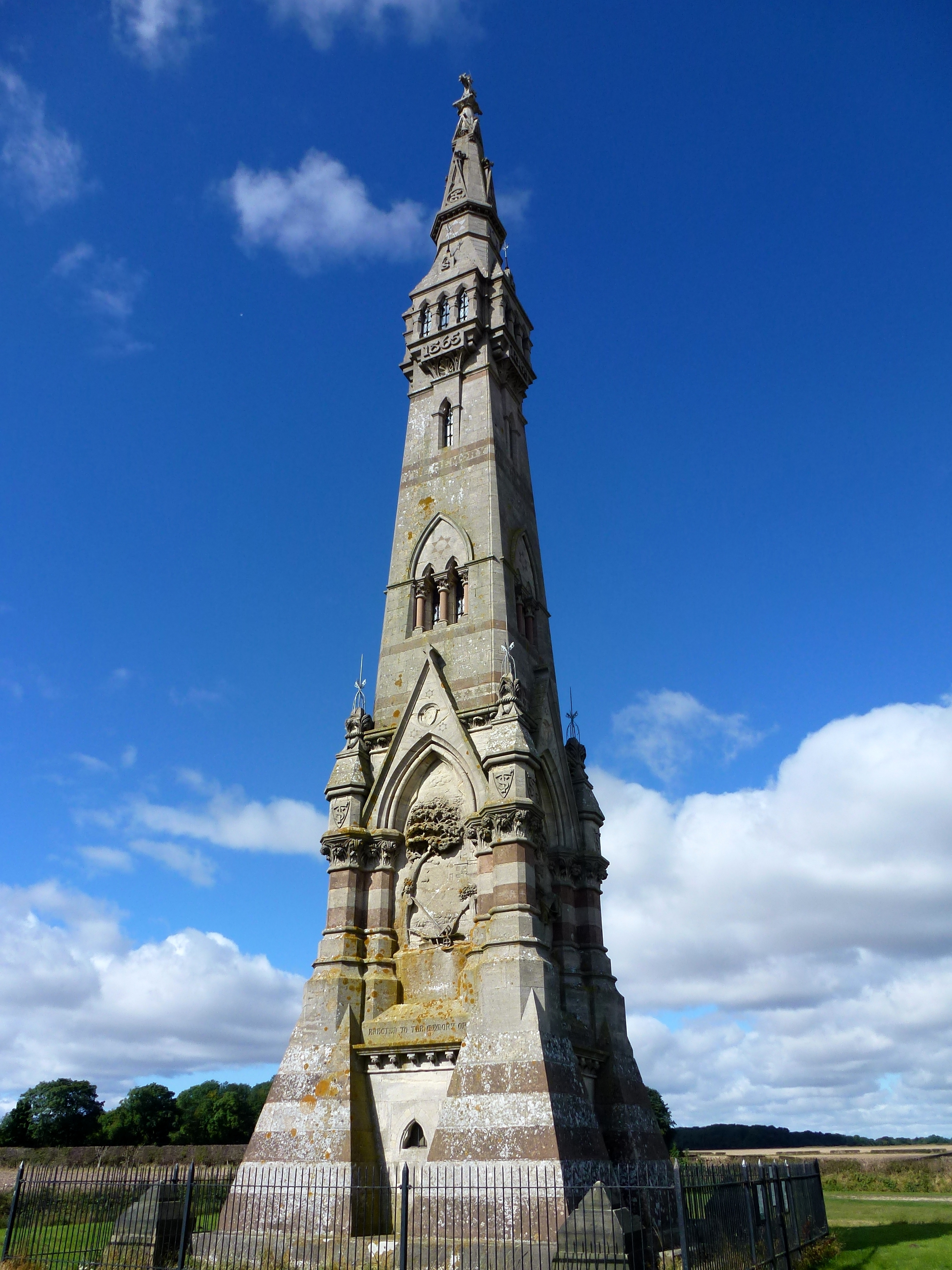
The structure, in 2012

The Sir Tatton Sykes Memorial Tower is a historic structure in Garton on the Wolds, a village in the East Riding of Yorkshire, in England.

The tower was commissioned by Sir Tatton Sykes, 5th Baronet, as a memorial to his father, Sir Tatton Sykes, 4th Baronet and funded by donations. A competition was held, to which 157 designs were submitted, with the winning design being by John Gibbs. The folly was constructed atop Garton Hill at a cost of £1,800, and was opened in 1866 by Christopher Sykes. It included sculpture panels by William Forsyth, although only two of four were complete in time for the opening. The structure was grade II listed in 1966.

The tower is built of magnesium limestone and pinkish sandstone, and consists of a polychrome tower 120 feet (37 m) in height. It has a square plan, and is tapering, with three stages. It is highly ornamented, including bands, inscriptions, pinnacles, buttresses, and a relief of Sir Tatton on horseback. On the top is an octagonal spire with finials and a cross at the apex.

== See also ==
- Listed buildings in Garton
