= Garton on the Wolds =

Village and civil parish in the East Riding of Yorkshire, England

Coordinates: 54°01′17″N 0°30′06″W

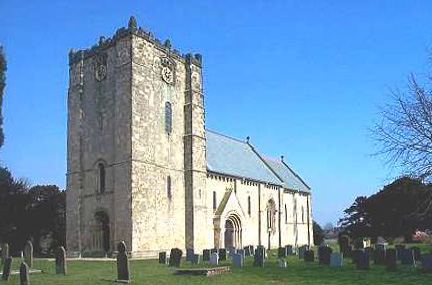
- St Michael and All Angels' Church, Garton on the Wolds, 2004

- Location within the East Riding of Yorkshire
- Population: 348 (2011 census)
- OS grid reference: SE983594
  - London: 170 mi (270 km) S
- Civil parish: Garton
- Unitary authority: East Riding of Yorkshire
- Ceremonial county: East Riding of Yorkshire
- Region: Yorkshire and the Humber
- Country: England
- Sovereign state: United Kingdom
- Post town: DRIFFIELD
- Postcode district: YO25
- Dialling code: 01377
- Police: Humberside
- Fire: Humberside
- Ambulance: Yorkshire
- UK Parliament: Bridlington and The Wolds

Garton on the Wolds is a village and (as just Garton) a civil parish on the Yorkshire Wolds in the East Riding of Yorkshire, England. It is situated approximately 3 miles (5 km) north-west of Driffield town centre and lies on the A166 road.

== History ==
Geological surveys of the Wolds area indicate that a river once flowed to the south of the village to a chalk and gravel lake. Archeological evidence has been found that shows habitation from about 12,000 years ago right through to modern times. Burial mounds containing chariots were found during gravel excavations. Artefacts have been discovered from Neolithic, Bronze Age, Iron Age into Roman times. There was evidence to support the existence of a Roman cremation cemetery in what was Garton brickyard.

Forming part of the northern parish boundary with neighbouring Sledmere Parish is a listed linear earthwork that is thought to be a prehistoric boundary marker. It runs for 3700m and is 36m wide flanked by ditches and is typical of similar earthworks in the Wolds. A total of fourteen listed barrows are recorded within the parish boundary. These are thought to be associated with a lost settlement at Garton Slack.

The name Garton derives from the Old English gāratūn meaning 'settlement on a triangular piece of land'.

The village is recorded in the Domesday Book The entry records 5 ploughlands and owned by the Archbishop of York with the local Lord being the canons of Beverley St John, though there are also three further records of the owner being Count Robert of Mortain. It had a population of seven households.

The village was served by the Malton and Driffield Junction Railway from 1846 until 1950, when passenger traffic ceased. Freight continued on the line until 20 October 1958. The station itself was located to the south of the village.

== Landmarks ==
Lying at the northern extent of the parish boundary on the B1252 is the Sir Tatton Sykes Memorial Tower. Built by J Gibbs of Oxford to the memory of Sir Tatton Sykes, 4th Baronet of Sledmere in 1865. It is 120 feet high with 3 stages leading to a spire.

Also within the parish boundary is Elmswell Old Hall built in 1634 for Henry Best. In the village itself are 12 Grade II listed houses as well as the Church and a graveslab.

Listed Buildings in Garton Parish
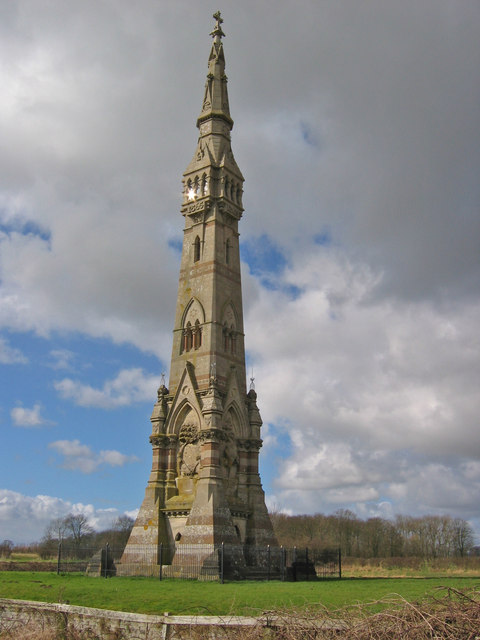
Sir Tatton Sykes's Monument

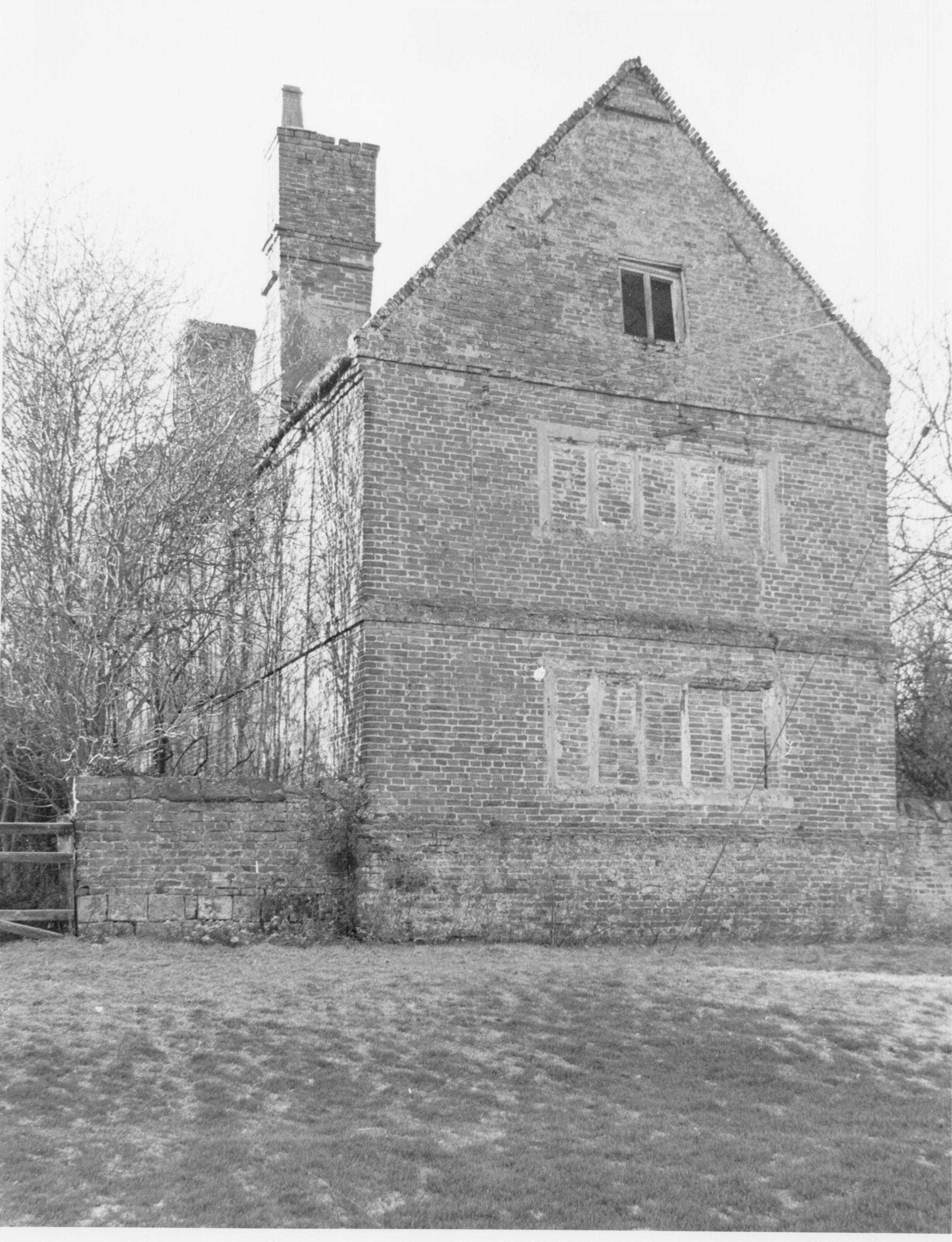
Elmswell Old Hall

== Governance and Demographics ==
The civil parish is formed by the village of Garton on the Wolds and the hamlet of Elmswell. According to the 2011 UK Census, Garton parish had a population of 348, an increase on the 2001 UK Census figure of 299. On 1 April 1935 the parish of "Garton on the Wolds" was abolished and merged with Emswell with Little Driffield to form "Garton" parish. In 1931 the old parish of "Garton on the Wolds" had a population of 402. The parish council is still called "Garton on the Wolds Parish Council".

In 1823 Garton parish was in the Wapentake of Dickering, and the Liberty of St Peter. There existed a Methodist chapel, and a school which was partly supported by revenue from shares in the Driffield Navigation. Population at the time was 357. Occupations included twelve farmers, three tailors, two butchers, two grocers, two wheelwrights, a blacksmith, a boot & shoe maker, and the landlords of The Three Tuns and The Chase Inn public houses. There was also a schoolmaster and five gentlemen.

== Education ==
The village has a primary school which is a Church of England (Voluntary Controlled) establishment catering for 3-11 year olds.

== Religion ==
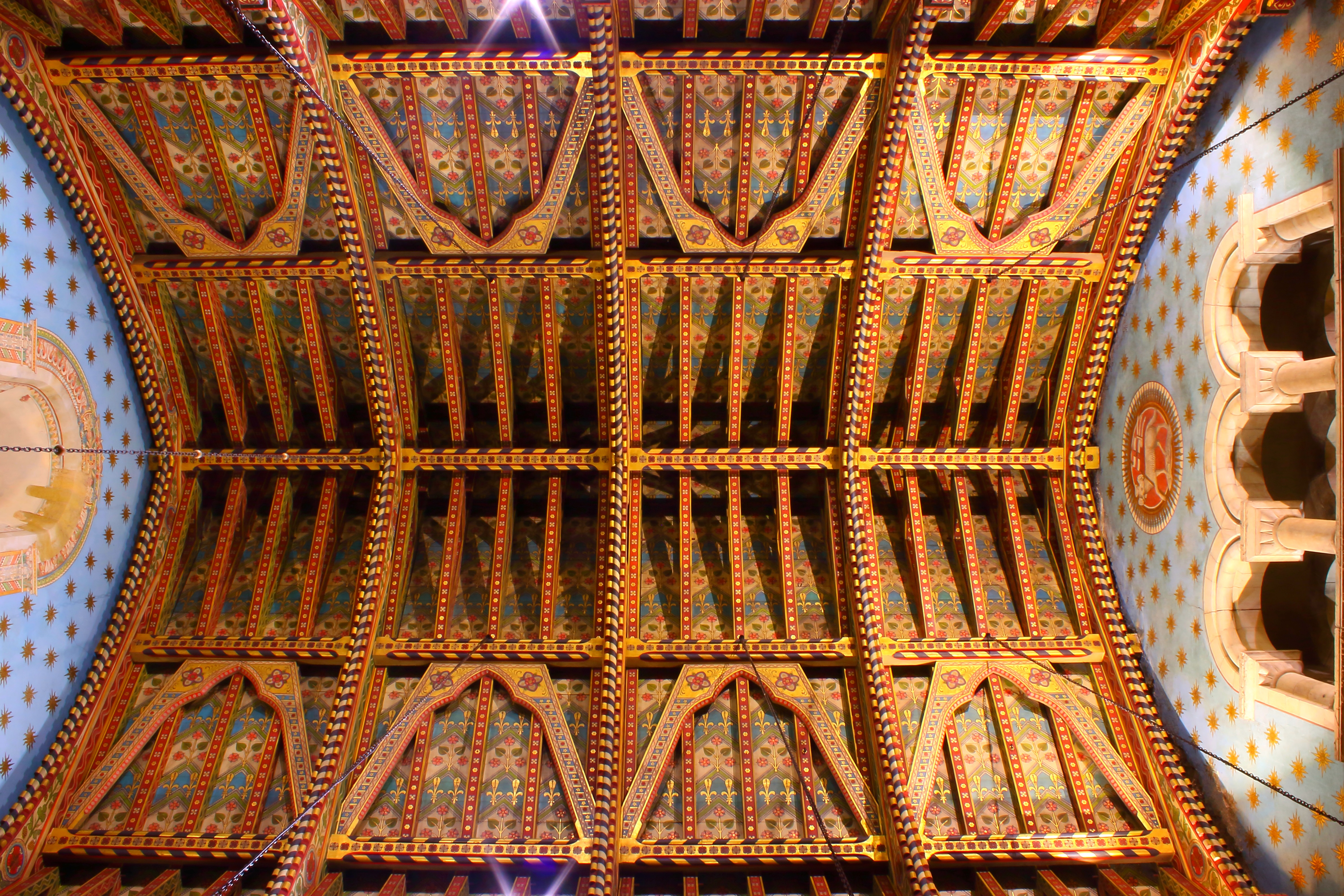
St Michael's and All Angels interior

Garton on the Wolds church, St Michael's and All Angels, was designated a Grade I listed building in 1966 and is now recorded in the National Heritage List for England, maintained by Historic England. It is on the Sykes Churches Trail devised by the East Yorkshire Churches Group.

The church dates back to Norman times, c. 1132. In the 19th century it was restored by John Loughborough Pearson, with funding from Sir Tatton Sykes, 4th Baronet of nearby Sledmere House. Later his son, Sir Tatton Sykes, 5th Baronet, employed George Edmund Street to furnish the church. It was eulogised by Nicholas Pevsner and is a popular visitor attraction due to its unique interior; the walls and ceilings are decorated in colourful murals depicting various biblical scenes, in sharp contrast to the stark interior of many other churches, and it has highly geometric floors in the altar and nave. The mosaics in the sacristy are in the Cosmati style.

== Sources ==
- Cooke, B. W. C., ed. (November 1958a). "The Malton-Driffield Line". Notes and News. The Railway Magazine. Vol. 104, no. 691. London: Tothill Press Limited. pp. 801–2.
- Gazetteer – A–Z of Towns Villages and Hamlets. East Riding of Yorkshire Council. 2006. p. 6.
- Quick, Michael (2009) [2001]. Railway passenger stations in Great Britain: a chronology (4th ed.). Oxford: Railway & Canal Historical Society. ISBN 978-0-901461-57-5. OCLC 612226077.
- Tomlinson, William Weaver (1915). The North Eastern Railway; its rise and development. Andrew Reid and Company, Newcastle; Longmans, Green and Company, London.
