= Albert Park =

Albert Park may refer to:

In Australia:

- Albert Park, South Australia, a suburb of Adelaide
- Albert Park, Victoria, a suburb of Melbourne
  - Albert Park and Lake, the park itself
  - Albert Park Circuit, the track currently used for Formula One races
  - Albert Park Football Club, an amateur football club
  - Albert Park Football Club (VFA), a former football club from the 1860s and 1870s
  - Albert Park light rail station, a light rail station served by the 96 tram
- Electoral district of Albert Park, an electoral district in Victoria
- Albert Park Baseball Complex in Lismore, New South Wales, home to international baseball stadium Baxter Field

In Canada:

- Albert Park, Calgary, Alberta

In the Democratic Republic of the Congo:

- Virunga National Park, a wildlife park formerly known as Albert National Park

In Fiji:

- Albert Park (Suva), Fiji

In New Zealand:

- Albert Park, Auckland

In United States:

- Albert Park, New York, New York
- Albert Park, San Rafael, California

In the United Kingdom:

- Albert Park, Abingdon, Berkshire, England
- Albert Park, Hawick, home ground of Hawick Royal Albert F.C.
- Albert Park, Middlesbrough, North Yorkshire, England
- Albert Park, Lower Broughton, Salford, England

== See also ==
- Albert College Park (Dublin), Ireland
