= Thirkleby =

Thirkleby may refer to:

- Thirkleby High and Low with Osgodby, a civil parish in the former Hambleton District, North Yorkshire, England, which includes the villages of Great Thirkleby and Little Thirkleby
- Thirkleby, Kirby Grindalythe, a hamlet in the parish of Kirby Grindalythe, in the former Ryedale District, North Yorkshire, from which Roger of Thirkleby's name was derived.

== See also ==
- Thirkleby Hall, a demolished 18th-century house in Great Thirkleby
