= Listed buildings in Kirby Grindalythe =

Kirby Grindalythe is a civil parish in the county of North Yorkshire, England. It contains six listed buildings that are recorded in the National Heritage List for England. Of these, one is listed at Grade II*, the middle of the three grades, and the others are at Grade II, the lowest grade. The parish contains the village of Kirby Grindalythe and the hamlet of Thirkleby, and the surrounding countryside. The listed buildings consist of a church, items in the churchyard, a house and two farmhouses.

== Key ==
Grade	Criteria
II*	Particularly important buildings of more than special interest
II	Buildings of national importance and special interest

== Buildings ==
Name and location	Photograph	Date	Notes	Grade
St Andrew's Church; 54.09563°N 0.61956°W		12th century	The oldest part of the church is the tower, the rest being built in 1878 and designed by G. E. Street. The church is built in sandstone and has a tile roof with pierced cresting. It consists of a nave with a clerestory, a north aisle, a south porch, a chancel with a north chapel and vestry, and a west tower. The tower has four stages,and a northeast stair turret with a conical roof. In the bottom stage is a doorway with a stepped round arch, above which are slit openings, a string course, two-light bell openings with pointed heads and hood moulds, a corbel table, a plain parapet with corner pinnacles, and a recessed octagonal spire with a weathervane.	II*
Thirkleby Manor Farmhouse; 54.10604°N 0.59451°W		Late 18th century	The farmhouse is in red brick with a dentilled eaves course, and an M-shaped slate roof with coped gables and shaped kneelers. There are two storeys and attics, a double depth plan, and three bays. On the front is a porch with fluted columns, and a doorway with fluted pilasters and a Gothick fanlight. The windows are sashes, the attic window horizontally-sliding.	II
Kirby Grange Farmhouse; 54.07122°N 0.62189°W		Early 19th century	The farmhouse is in red brick, with painted sandstone dressings, a stepped eaves band, and a hipped pantile roof. There are two storeys, a double depth plan, three bays, and flanking screen walls. In the centre is a gabled porch, and a doorway with a radial fanlight. The windows on the front are sashes with wedge lintels. At the rear are horizontally-sliding sashes and a round-arched stair window with imposts.	II
Churchyard cross, steps and walled platform 54.09549°N 0.61964°W		1878	The steps and walls in the churchyard of St Andrew's Church are in sandstone, and were designed by G. E. Street. The steps are on the north and south sides of the platform, a seat is incorporated on the west side, and the walls have moulded coping. On the east side is a cross added in 1887 and designed by Temple Moore. It has a cruciform base, an octagonal shaft, and an embattled top. The cross consists of a crucifix under a gabled canopy.	II
Lychgate, churchyard wall and footgate 54.09534°N 0.61964°W		1878	The lychgate and churchyard walls of St Andrew's Church are in sandstone, and were designed by G. E. Street. The lychgate is in the form of a tower, with buttresses, and a moulded segmental pointed arch with a hood mould. Above it is an eaves bands, a cornice, an embattled parapet and a pyramidal tile roof. The walls have moulded coping, and contain a footgate flanked by square piers with gabled moulded caps.	II
The Gables; 54.09582°N 0.61690°W		1897	A house in pink-orange brick on a plinth, with quoins and a tile roof. There are two storeys and five bays, the left bay canted on the corner. Four of the bays are gabled, with bargeboards and terracotta finials. In the middle bay is a canted bay window, and to its right is a porch with a Tudor arched opening. The windows vary, most are casements, and all are recessed with moulded brick surrounds and moulded terracotta sills.	II
