= Kirby Grindalythe =

Village and civil parish in North Yorkshire, England

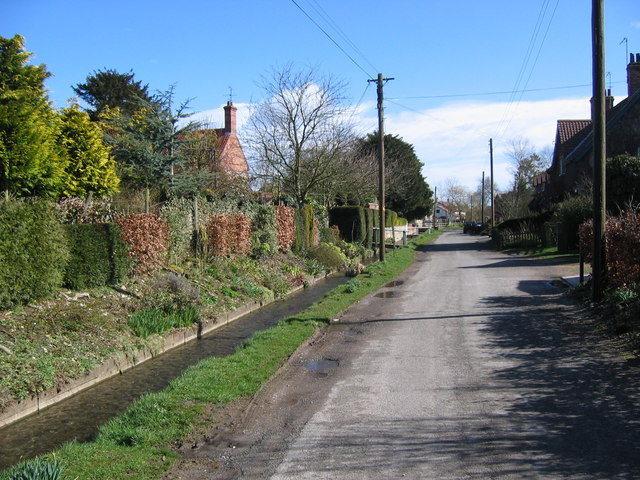
- Kirby Grindalythe

- Location within North Yorkshire
- Population: 295 (2011 census)
- OS grid reference: SE905675
  - London: 180 mi (290 km) S
- Civil parish: Kirby Grindalythe
- Unitary authority: North Yorkshire
- Ceremonial county: North Yorkshire
- Region: Yorkshire and the Humber
- Country: England
- Sovereign state: United Kingdom
- Post town: MALTON
- Postcode district: YO17
- Police: North Yorkshire
- Fire: North Yorkshire
- Ambulance: Yorkshire
- UK Parliament: Thirsk and Malton

Kirby Grindalythe is a village and civil parish in North Yorkshire, England. It is situated about 8 miles (13 km) south-east of Malton. The village lies in the Great Wold Valley and the course of the winterbourne stream the Gypsey Race passes through it.

== History ==
The name of the village is derived from Old Norse. Kirby kirkiubỹr means "village with a church", the Grindal element is a distortion of Cranedale, meaning "valley with cranes" and lythe is from Old Norse "hlíõ" meaning slope. Kirby Grindalythe was mentioned in the Domesday Book as being in the Hundred of Toreshou (Buckrose), belonging to King William, and having one ploughland. The settlement was built around its parish church in the upper Gypsey Race Valley, and in Medieval times, it was the most important settlement in the area.

Kirby Grindalythe village has a resident population of roughly fifty. There are no shops, pubs or other services and the nearest town is Malton. St Andrew's Church, Kirby Grindalythe is on the Sykes Churches Trail having been restored by Sir Tatton Sykes in 1872–5 and again more recently after a grant of about £175,000 from English Heritage. The church is now a Grade II* listed building.

The village is also the location of the Cranedale Centre, a residential Field Studies Centre providing courses in environmental subjects and outdoor education to people of all ages. The centre operates from a converted farm and has been open since 1983.

== Governance ==
The civil parish of Kirby Grindalythe, which included the village of Duggleby from 1935 to 2026, had a population of 247 people living in 92 households at the time of the 2001 Census. The population at the 2011 Census had risen to 295. In 1823 Kirby Grindalythe was a civil parish with a population of 178 in the Wapentake of Buckrose. It was historically part of the Norton Rural District in the East Riding of Yorkshire until 1974. Between 1974 and 2023 the parish was part of the Ryedale district. It is now administered by North Yorkshire Council. On 1 April 1935 the parishes of Duggleby and Thirkleby were abolished and merged with Kirby Grindalythe. On 1 April 2026 the parish was abolished and split with Duggleby becoming a parish again and a new "Kirby Grindalythe" parish formed. It is represented at Westminster as part of the Thirsk and Malton Constituency.

Population of Kirkby Grindalythe 1801–2015
1801	1811	1821	1831	1841	1851	1861	1871	1881	1891	1901	1911	1921	1931	1951	1961	1971	1981	1991	2001	2011	2015
276	311	376	414	474	554	571	566	534	449	415	411	359	332	327	303	291	290	284	247	295	350 (Note: Estimated population.)

== High Mowthorpe ==
Also in the civil parish is the former hamlet of High Mowthorpe (54.10819°N 0.64231°W ), which is now an ADAS farm and arable research centre. The farm is a mixed arable and livestock farm, covering 437 hectares (1,080 acres) with 97 hectares (240 acres) managed organically. Laboratory and glasshouse facilities are located on the site as well as a weather station providing data to the Met Office. High Mowthorpe is also the home of ADAS Pest Evaluation Services, which processes approximately 4,000 soil and plant samples annually to determine pest and disease levels.

Climate data for High Mowthorpe: Average maximum and minimum temperatures, and average rainfall recorded between 1991 and 2020 by the Met Office. elevation: 175 m (574 ft)
Month	Jan	Feb	Mar	Apr	May	Jun	Jul	Aug	Sep	Oct	Nov	Dec	Year
Mean daily maximum °C (°F)	5.7 (42.3)	6.4 (43.5)	8.6 (47.5)	11.4 (52.5)	14.4 (57.9)	17.3 (63.1)	19.9 (67.8)	20.0 (68.0)	16.8 (62.2)	12.7 (54.9)	8.7 (47.7)	6.2 (43.2)	12.4 (54.3)
Mean daily minimum °C (°F)	0.9 (33.6)	1.0 (33.8)	2.1 (35.8)	3.8 (38.8)	6.3 (43.3)	8.9 (48.0)	11.0 (51.8)	11.3 (52.3)	9.6 (49.3)	6.9 (44.4)	3.7 (38.7)	1.3 (34.3)	5.6 (42.1)
Average precipitation mm (inches)	64.8 (2.55)	55.5 (2.19)	48.8 (1.92)	55.4 (2.18)	51.4 (2.02)	75.0 (2.95)	63.6 (2.50)	71.8 (2.83)	62.3 (2.45)	72.5 (2.85)	79.3 (3.12)	70.6 (2.78)	771.1 (30.36)
Average precipitation days (≥ 1.0 mm)	12.6	11.7	9.8	9.5	9.4	10.6	10.6	11.1	9.7	12.2	13.7	12.6	133.6
Mean monthly sunshine hours	54.8	81.2	120.9	161.0	208.5	188.4	198.0	181.2	141.6	104.3	65.8	51.1	1,557.1
Source: Met Office

== See also ==
- Listed buildings in Kirby Grindalythe

== Gallery ==
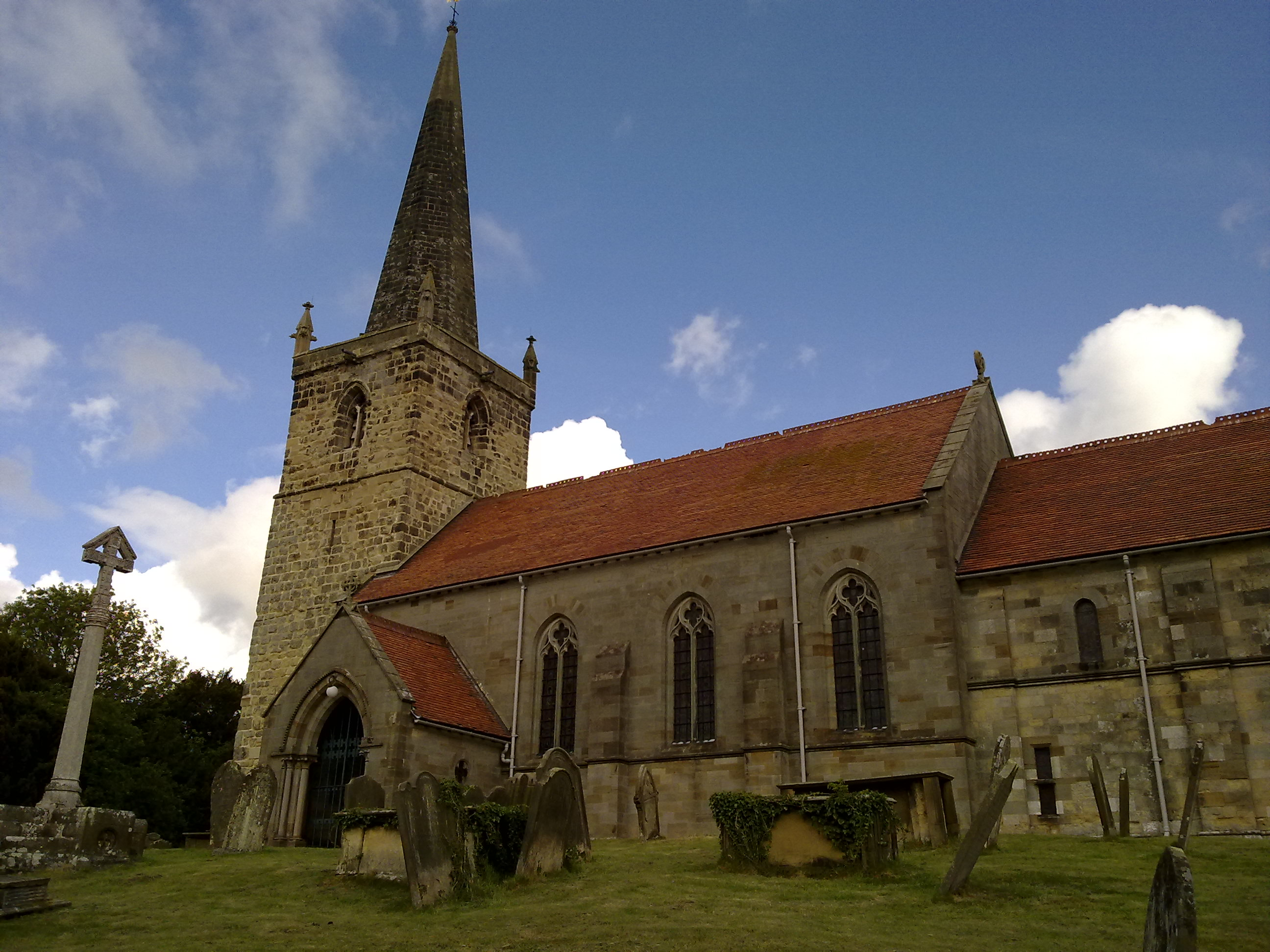
St Andrew's Church

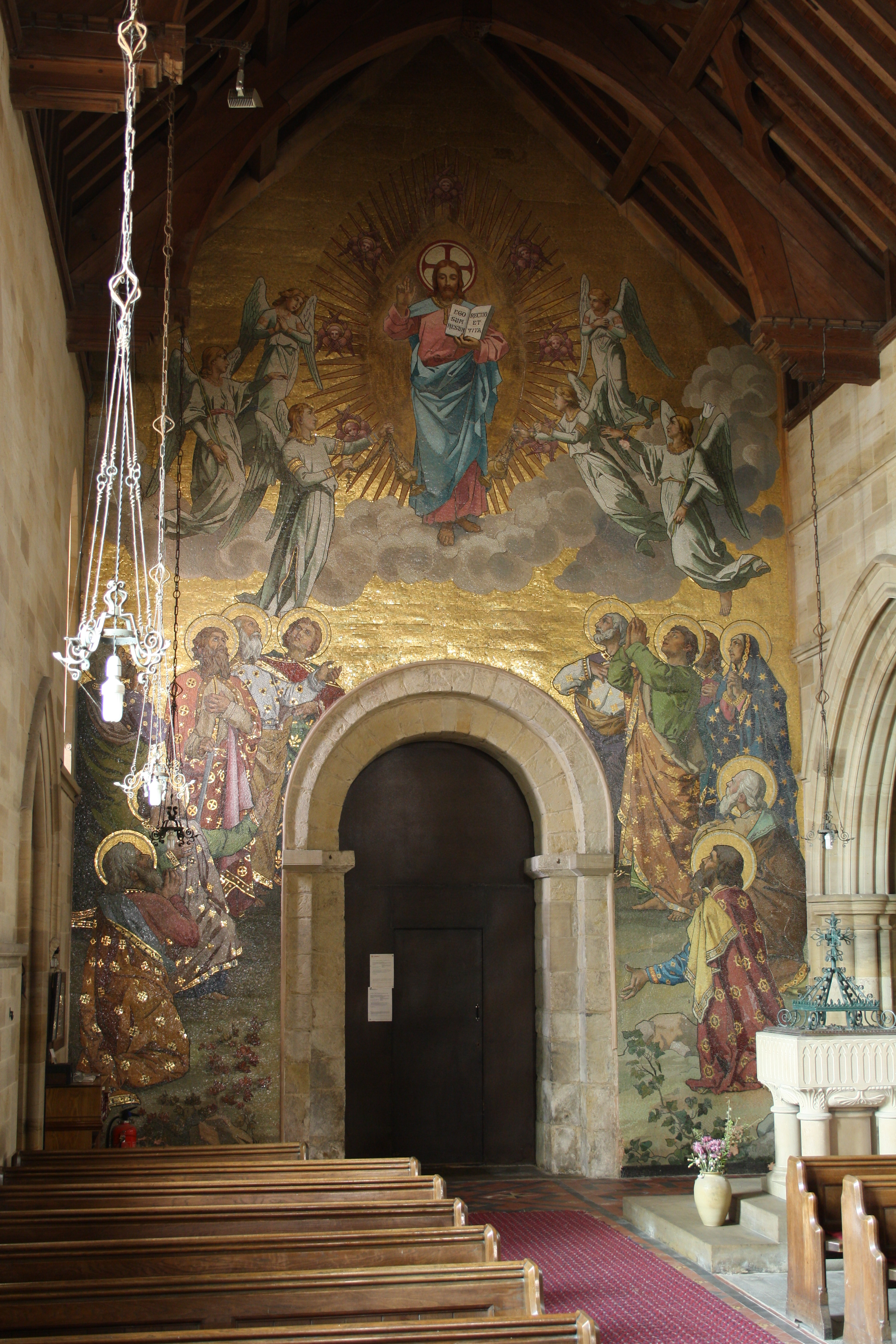
Interior of St Andrew's
