= John Newman (architectural historian) =

English architectural historian (1936–2023)

John Newman FSA
- Newman in 2001
- Born: John Arthur Newman; 14 December 1936
- Died: 19 April 2023 (aged 86)
- Education: Dulwich College, Oxford University, Courtauld Institute of Art
- Occupation: Architectural historian
- Notable work: The Buildings of England, The Buildings of Wales

John Arthur Newman FSA (14 December 1936 – 19 April 2023) was an English architectural historian. He was the author of several of the Pevsner Architectural Guides and was the advisory editor to the series.

== Life and career ==
John Arthur Newman was born on 14 December 1936, and lived most of his life in Kent. He was educated at Dulwich College and Oxford University where he read Greats (classics). In 1959 he became a classics teacher at Tonbridge School. In 1963 he left his teaching post to study for a diploma in the history of European art at the Courtauld Institute of Art, which he passed with distinction. In 1966 he was appointed a full-time assistant lecturer at the Courtauld, where he taught until his retirement.

While a student at the Courtauld, Newman acted as driver to Nikolaus Pevsner while Pevsner was undertaking work on The Buildings of England series, which has subsequently been expanded as the Pevsner Architectural Guides to cover Scotland, Wales and Ireland. Pevsner suggested that Newman should research and write the architectural guides on Kent, which were published in 1969. Bridget Cherry, the general editor of the series, and author of a history of the project, describes Newman as the most significant of Pevsner's collaborators, and Pevsner himself considered Newman's two volumes on Kent to be "the best of the whole series". From 1983, Newman acted as the advisory editor to the series.

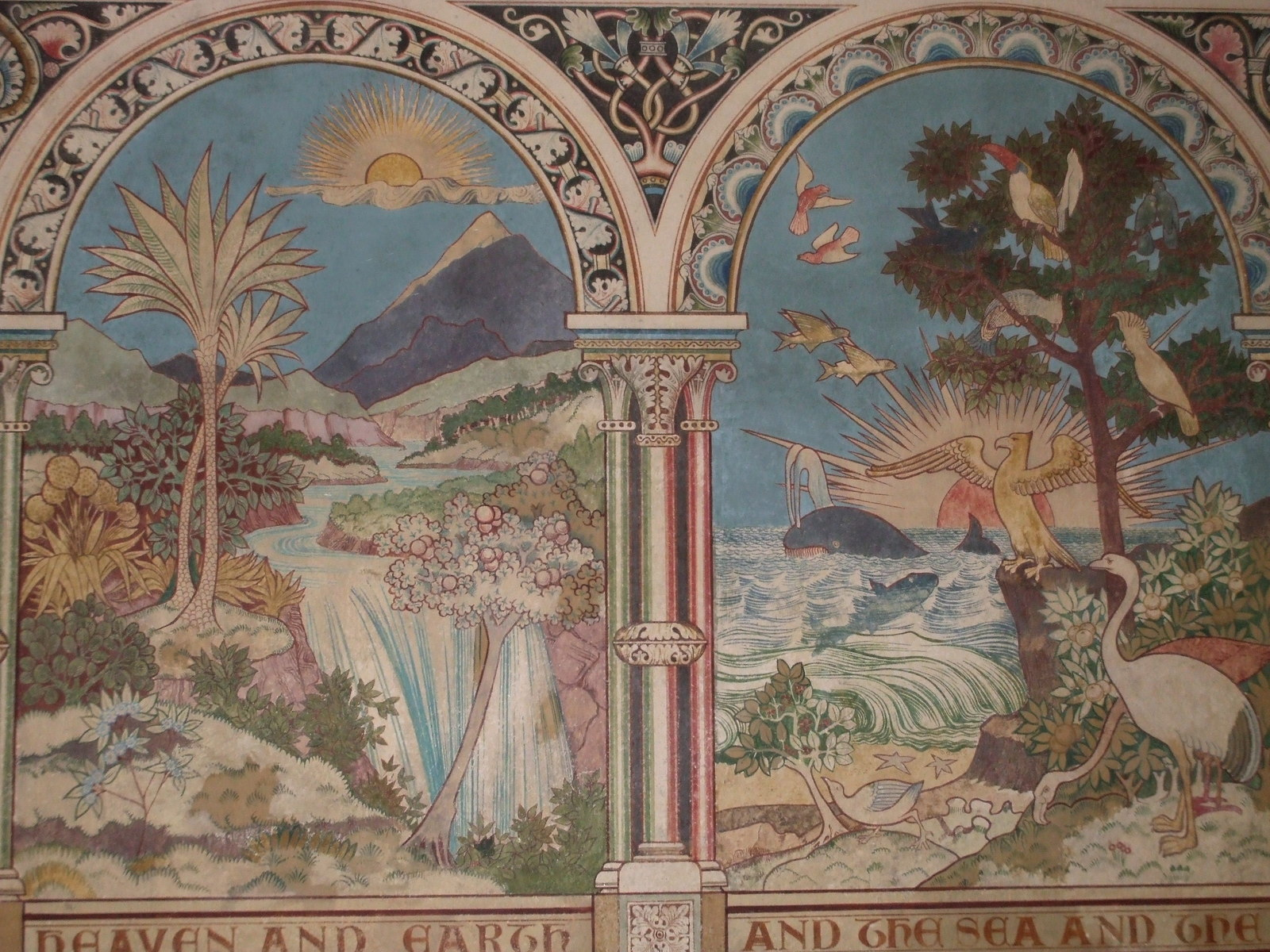
The murals which were restored by the Pevsner Memorial Trust.

From 1975 to 1985 Newman was honorary editor of the journal Architectural History. He has served on the executive committee of the Society of Architectural Historians of Great Britain. In 1986 Newman chaired the Pevsner Memorial Trust, which undertook the restoration of the murals at the Church of St Michael and All Angels in Garton on the Wolds, in the East Riding of Yorkshire, in memory of Sir Nikolaus.

John Newman died on 19 April 2023, at the age of 86.

== Publications ==
- The Buildings of England
  Dorset (1972) (with Nikolaus Pevsner)
  Kent – West and the Weald (2012)
  Kent – North East and East (2013)
  Shropshire (2006)
- The Buildings of Wales
  Glamorgan (1995)
  Gwent/Monmouthshire (2000)
