= Elmswell Old Hall =

17th-century manor house

Coordinates: 54°00′35″N 0°28′44″W

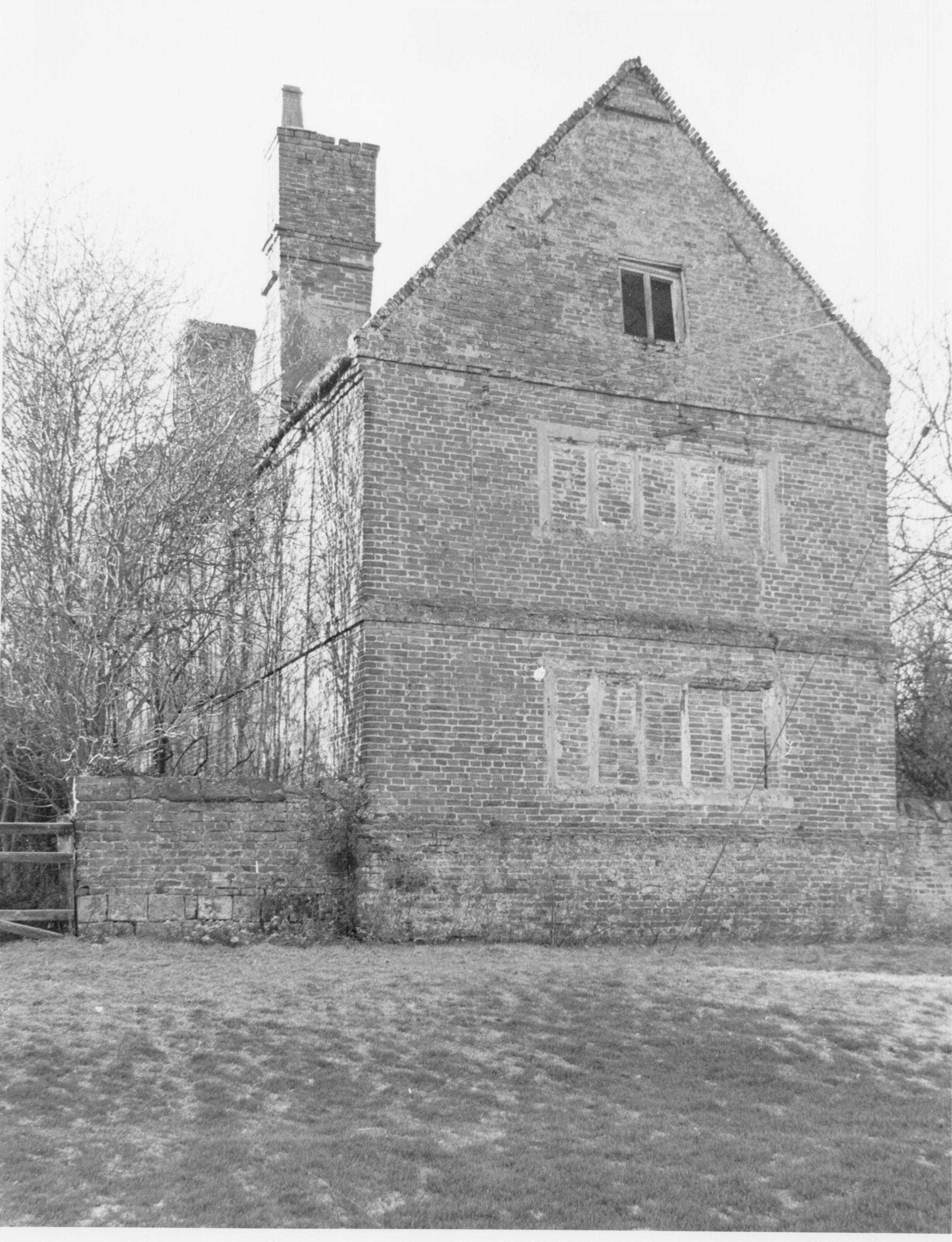
- Elmswell Old Hall in 1997.
- Interactive map of the Elmswell Old Hall area

General information
- Type: Manor house
- Location: Elmswell, East Riding of Yorkshire
- Completed: c. 1634–1635

Listed Building – Grade II*
- Official name: Elmswell Old Hall
- Designated: 22 September 1966; 59 years ago
- Reference no.: 1083792

Elmswell Old Hall is a Grade-II* listed 17th-century manor house in the hamlet of Elmswell in the East Riding of Yorkshire, England.

== History ==
The land on which the hall stands was once part of the larger Elmswell Estate, which is mentioned in the Doomsday Book. Henry Best, a gentleman farmer and writer whose work documented contemporary rural and agricultural life, bought the land in 1597 for £2000, building the hall in c.1634–1635. Best writes of the hall throughout his works. Best sold the property to his brother, James, through whose family it passed until the 1840s. Mary Ellen Best painted a watercolour of the hall's kitchen in 1834, which is now held by the Victoria and Albert Museum. The property had several owners in the 19th- and 20th-centuries.

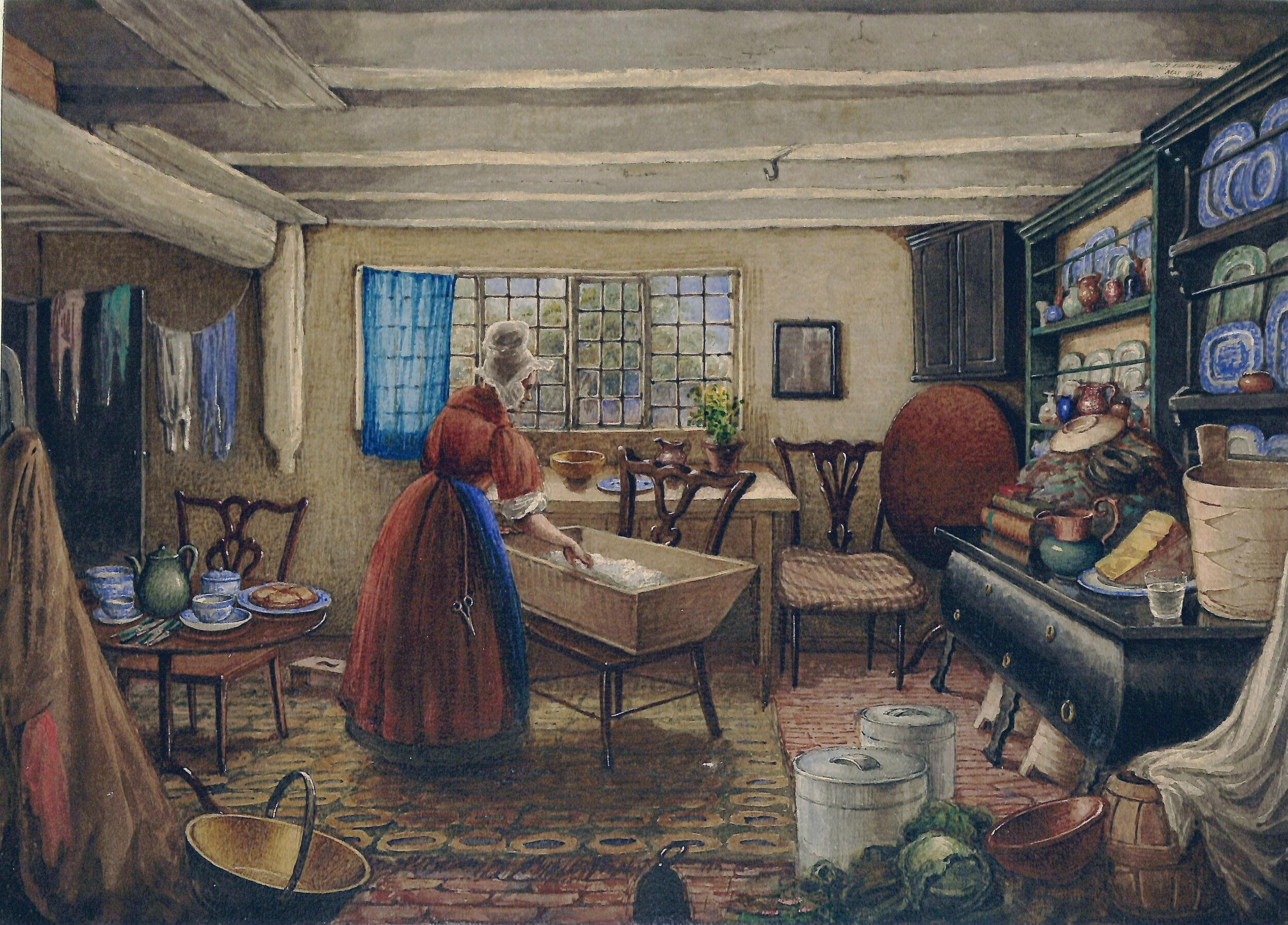
The Kitchen at Elmswell Hall, a watercolour by Mary Ellen Best, 1834.

The final occupants, the Mackrill family, undertook remedial works to the hall, leaving in 1965. Following the Mackrill's departure, the hall fell into a state of disrepair. In the 1970s, the roof collapsed, leaving the interior exposed. As of 2026, the property is in private ownership and opens once a year to visitors under an agreement with East Riding Council.

== Architecture ==
Elmswell Old Hall was built in either 1634 or 1635 of red brick, with additions made in the 18th- and 19th-centuries. It is thought to be one of the first brick buildings in East Yorkshire. Over the main entrance door is a medieval carved stone head of a man. Prior to the collapse of the roof, the interior is documented by a 1966 Historic England report as having "[17th-century] panelling to some rooms". The hall was designated as a Grade-II* listed building on 20 September 1966 and is given as being "of outstanding significance for its historical associations with Henry Best".

== See also ==
- Grade II* listed buildings in the East Riding of Yorkshire
- Listed buildings in Garton
