= Christ's Hospital of Abingdon =

Charity based in Abingdon, Oxfordshire, United Kingdom

Coordinates: 51.67195°N 1.28124°W

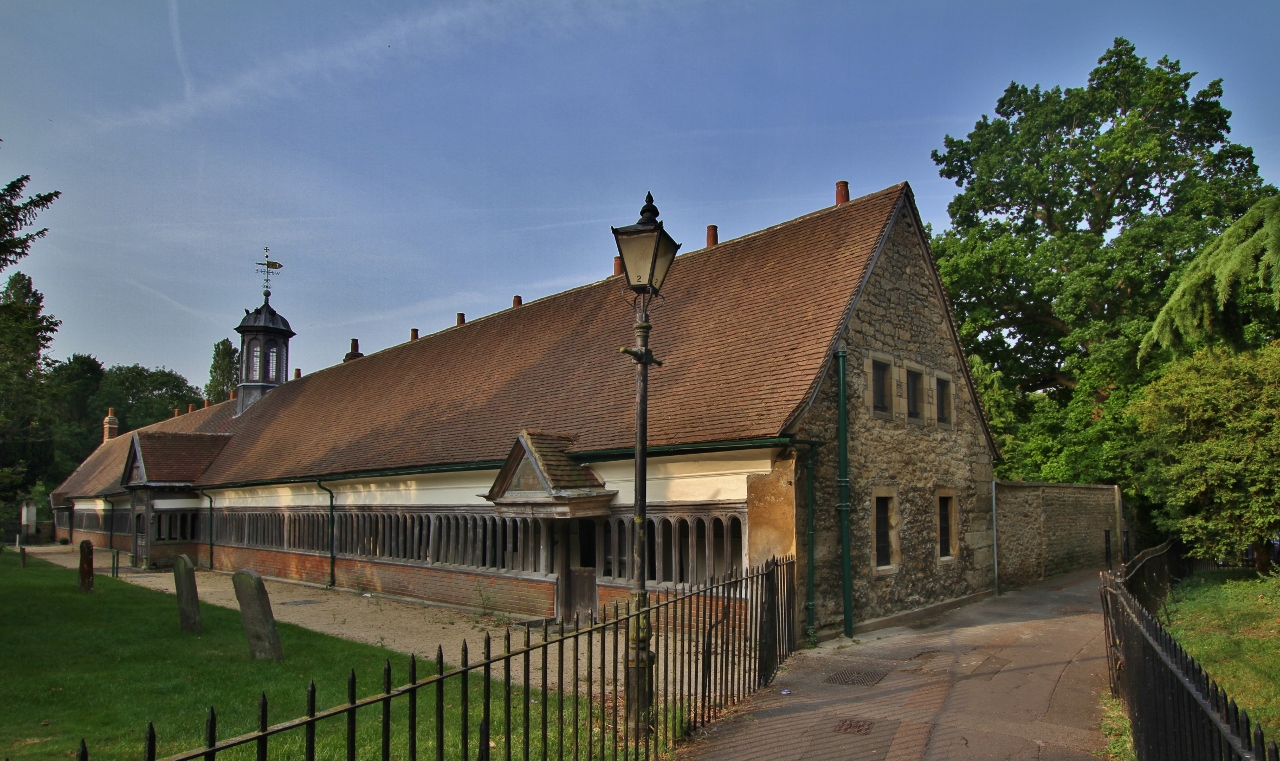
Long Alley Almshouses next to St Helen's parish church, used by Christ's Hospital for meetings.

Christ's Hospital of Abingdon is a charity with a long history, based in Abingdon-on-Thames, Oxfordshire (formerly Berkshire).

== History ==
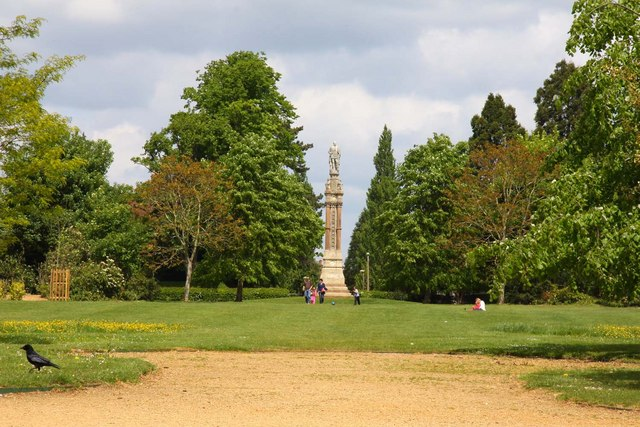
Part of Albert Park, Abingdon, with the Albert Monument in the centre. Christ's Hospital of Abingdon established the park in the 1860s.

A royal charter established the Master and Governors of the Hospital of Christ of Abingdon in 1553, the year that Mary I succeeded to the English throne. Sir John Mason, a Tudor diplomat, was its first Master from 1553 to 1566.

The charity supports almshouses in Abingdon. Sampson Strong decorated the hall with portraits of founders, benefactors and former governors.

The charity has been involved with education, educating Abingdon boys from 1608 until 1870. There has been a close connection with Abingdon School since 1870.

Christ's Hospital established Albert Park in northwest Abingdon (west of Abingdon School) in the 1860s on the site of the former Conduit Field.

The current charity is based at St Helen's Wharf in Abingdon, Registered Charity Number 205112.

== Names of Masters ==
The following list contains the names of the Masters.

Name of Master	Year/s as Master
Sir John Mason	1553–1565
Roger Amice	1566, 1567, 1568
Richard Mayott	1569, 1570
Thomas Orpwood	1571, 1604, 1613, 1614
James Fisher	1572, 1578, 1585
William Braunch	1573, 1574, 1581, 1593
Thomas Stampe	1575, 1577
Thomas Smith	1576, 1582
Thomas Tesdale	1579
Thomas Mayott	1580, 1594, 1603, 1627
Paule Orpwood	1583, 1595
Lionell Bostock	1584, 1598
John Fisher	1586
William Kishey	1587
Anthony Tesdale	1588, 1607
John Wise	1580
Richard Tesdale	1590
William Lee	1591, 1602, 1619, 1624
William Welling	1592
Francis Little	1596, 1597
Robert Payne	1599, 1621
John Blacknall	1600
Paule Dayrell	1601
James Hide	1605
William Bostock	1606
Thomas Reade	1608, 1623, 1632
Lawrence Stevenson	1609, 1620
John Mayott	1612, 1615, 1616, 1625, 1633, 1649, 1659
Richard Curtyn	1617, 1627, 1635
Robert Kisbey	1618
Richard Chickin	1622
Thomas Clempson	1626
Edmond Bostock	1628, 1636
John Fyssher	1629
John Payne	1630
Edmund Franklyn	1631, 1642, 1654
Thomas Wilde	1637
John Hawes	1638
William Castell	1638
Richard Mayott	1639, 1643
William Payne	1640
Richard Payne	1641
Robert Mayott	1643
Thomas Steed	1644
John Bolter	1645, 1656
James Curteyne	1646, 1657, 1665, 1675, 1684
Thomas Payne	1647, 1655
Richard Cheyney	1648
Francis Payne	1650, 1658, 1668, 1672
Jonathan Hawe	1651, 1660, 1664, 1671, 1682
Edward Bond	1652, 1662
William Wells	1653, 1661
William Cheyney	1663, 1666
William Weston	1667
John Payne	1668, 1677, 1686, 1694
George Winchurst	1670
Robert Blackaller	1673, 1678, 1685, 1693, 1709
Robert Morris	1674, 1679, 1687, 1695
William Cheyney	1676, 1690
Robert Sellwood	1680, 1689, 1696, 1703
Richard West	1681, 1688
Thomas Hulcotts	1683
James Corderoy	1691
Thomas Sparks	1692
Michael Rawlins	1697, 1705, 1716, 1723
Henry Knapp	1698, 1708
John Sellwood	1699, 1707
John Spinage	1700, 1714
Richard Ely	1701, 1706, 1715, 1724, 1726, 1729
George Drew	1702
Robert Mayott	1704
Thomas King	1710
William Phillipson	1711
William Dunn	1712
Richard Mayott	1713
John Rawlins	1717
Anthony Clackson	1718
Clement Saxton	1719, 1729
Thomas Prince Sr.	1720
John Pretty	1721
Matthew Anderson	1722, 1739, 1740, 1741, 1752, 1759, 1764
James Saunders	1725, 1740
William Wells	1726
Thomas Read	1727, 1730, 1741

Name of Master	Year/s as Master
John Waldron	1728
William Motley	1730
Edward Saxton	1731
Edward Green	1732, 1743
William Hawkins	1733, 1744
Edward Spinage	1734, 1742
William Yateman	1735, 1745
John Crossley	1736, 1746
John Knapp	1737, 1747
John Fludger	1738, 1748, 1764
Thomas Justice	1749, 1757, 1761, 1765
John Eldridge	1750, 1766
Richard Basely	1751, 1770
Rev. Michael Rawlins	1753
Edward Baldwin	1754
Richard Rose	1755, 1771
George Knapp Sr.	1756, 1772
Charles Cox	1757
Henry Harding	1758
John Bowles	1760, 1784
John Knapp	1762
Thomas Prince Jr.	1763
Joseph Penn	1767
Robert Crew	1768
Dudson Rawlins	1769, 1790
William Bowles	1776, 1778, 1789
William Eldridge	1777, 1792
John Payne	1778
Robert Crew	1780
James Powell	1780, 1793
John Harding	1781
John Bedwell	1782, 1794
Edward Child	1783, 1795, 1804, 1814
Samuell Sellwood	1785, 1797, 1805, 1816
William Allder	1786, 1798, 1806
George Hawkins	1787, 1788
James Penn	1791
James Smallbone	1793
Thomas Prince III	1796, 1808, 1812
Henry Knapp Sr.	1799, 1811
John Eldridge	1800
Thomas Knight	1801, 1814, 1815, 1826, 1827
Benjamin Morland	1802
John Gallaway	1803
John Francis Spenlove	1807, 1820, 1828
Thomas Baker	1809, 1819, 1831
James Cole	1810, 1821, 1832
Richard Bradfield	1813, 1824
Samuel Cripps	1817
Henry Knapp Jr.	1818, 1834
Thomas West	1822
Thomas Curtis	1823, 1835
Charles King	1825, 1837
William Church	1826
John Vindin Collingwood	1829, 1839
William Strange	1830
William Doe Belcher	1833, 1842, 1843, 1854
George Bowes Morland	1836, 1844, 1866, 1867
Daniel Godfrey	1838, 1847, 1855, 1859, 1868
Richard Badcock	1840, 1864
Benjamin Collingwood	1841
John Hyde	1845, 1850, 1856, 1861, 1870
John Tomkins	1846, 1851, 1857
William Belcher	1848, 1853, 1862
Thomas Hedges Graham	1849, 1860, 1869
Edwin James Trendell	1852, 1863
William Pemberton	1858, 1865
John Creemer Clarke	c.1890
Arthur Edwin Preston	1929
John Holden Hooke	1959
Herbert George Mullard	1962–76
Douglas Arthur Kitto	
Dr Jack Cherry	1984–85
Ernest William Johnston Nicholson	1985–86
William James Howard Liversidge	1986, 1987
Norman John Holmes	
David Roger Barrett	
Michael William Matthews	1997
Thomas Chamberlain	1998
Helen Mary Ronaldson	2003
Geoffrey Robert Morris	2008
Robert Farrant	2009
Tom Ayling	2018–present

== See also ==
- List of almshouses in the United Kingdom
