= St Andrew's Church, Kirby Grindalythe =

Church in North Yorkshire, England

Coordinates: 54°05′44″N 0°37′11″W

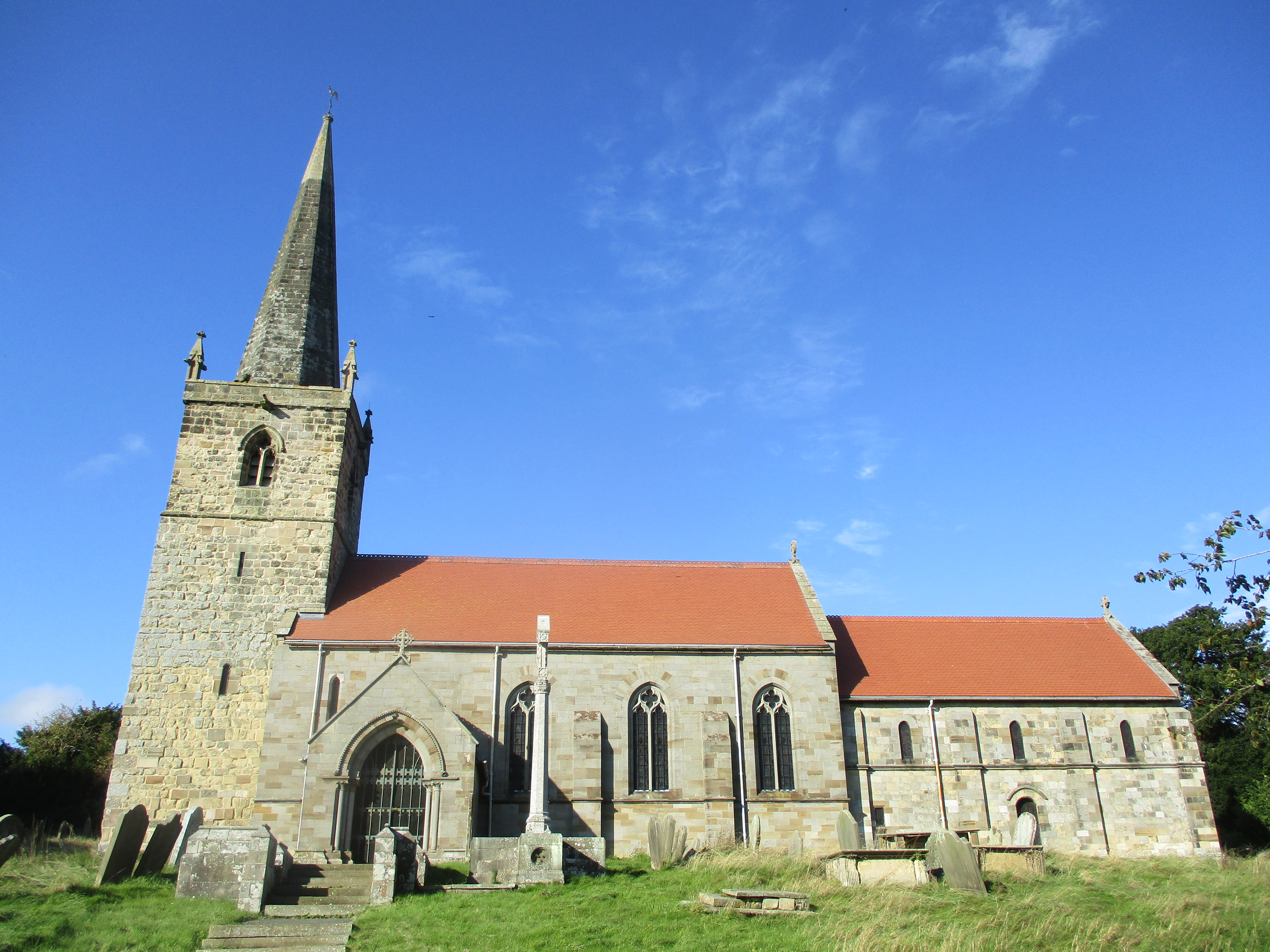
The church, in 2021

St Andrew's Church is the parish church of Kirby Grindalythe, a village in North Yorkshire, in England.

A church was built on the site in the 12th century, from which period the lower part of the tower survives, along with some of the stonework of the nave. The upper part of the tower is 14th century, but the remainder of the building was reconstructed between 1872 and 1875 by G. E. Street. The building was grade II* listed in 1966. The church was temporarily closed in the 2000s due to falling masonry, but was restored at a cost of £500,000, most of which cost was met by English Heritage.

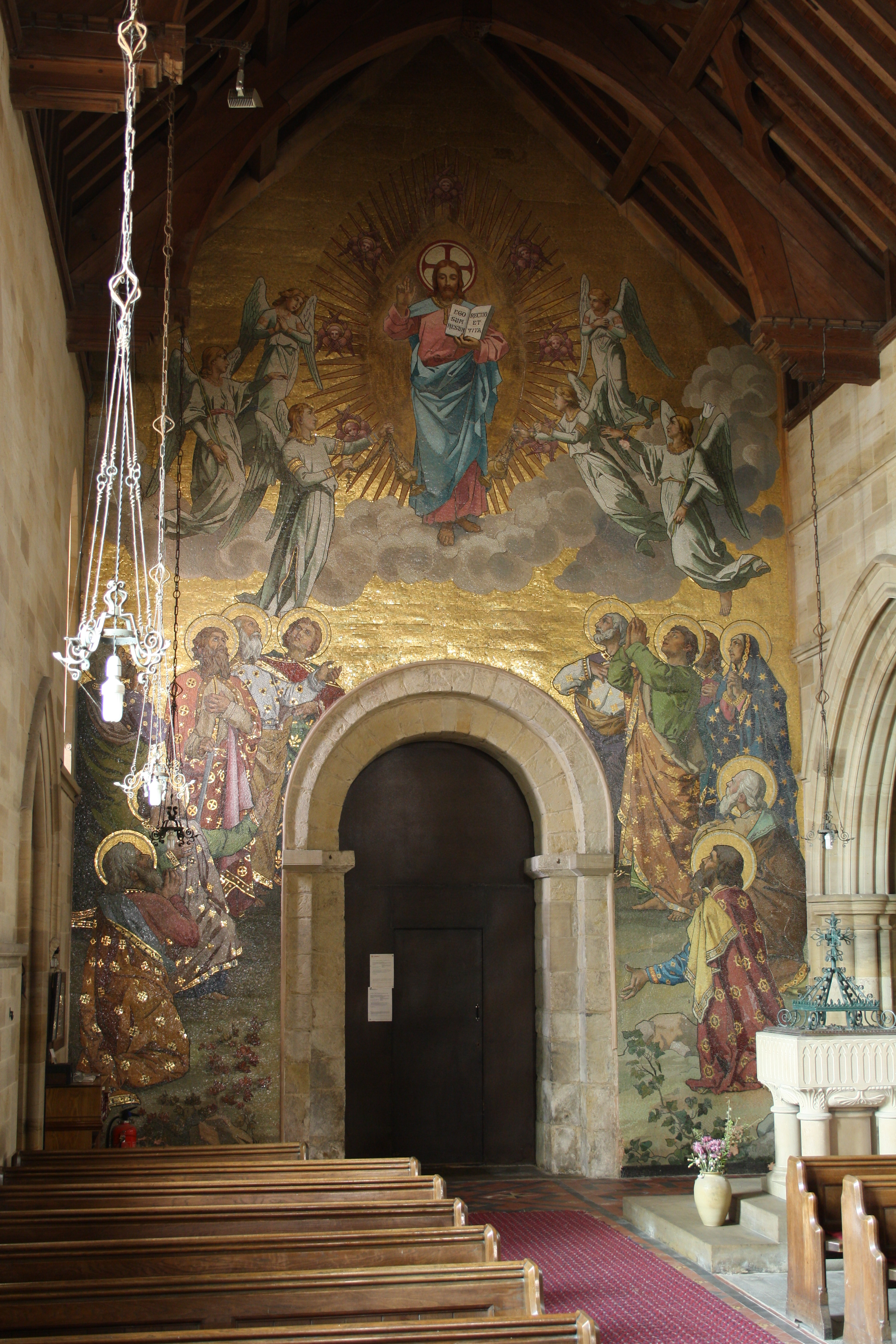
Mosaic of the Ascension

The church is built of sandstone and has a tile roof with pierced cresting. It consists of a nave with a clerestory, a north aisle, a south porch, a chancel with a north chapel and vestry, and a west tower. The tower has four stages,and a northeast stair turret with a conical roof. In the bottom stage is a doorway with a stepped round arch, above which are slit openings, a string course, two-light bell openings with pointed heads and hood moulds, a corbel table, a plain parapet with corner pinnacles, and a recessed octagonal spire with a weathervane. The roof is tunnel vaulted.

Inside the church, there is a sedilia, of which the outer seats are Norman; an aumbry, and a reused piscina. There is a square font which is a replica of a 12th-century font built into the tower. The west wall has a large mosaic of the Ascension of Jesus by an unknown Italian artist, and an alabaster and marble altarpiece by James Redfern. The stained glass windows are mostly by Clayton and Bell, with those in the south aisle by Burlison and Grylls. In the chapel is a 12th-century arcaded tomb, which may be that of Walter Espec.

== See also ==
- Grade II* listed churches in North Yorkshire (district)
- Listed buildings in Kirby Grindalythe
