= Garton railway station =

Disused railway station in the East Riding of Yorkshire, England

Garton
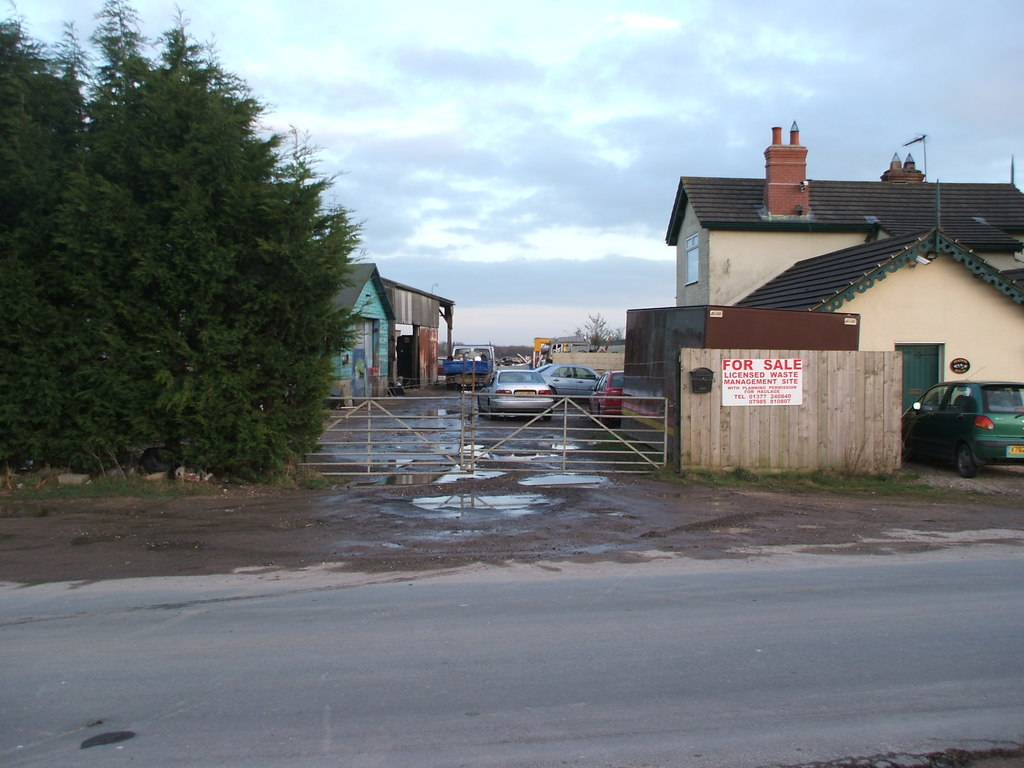
- Site of the station in February 2008

General information
- Location: Garton-on-the-Wolds, East Riding of Yorkshire; England
- Coordinates: 54.008269°N 0.505371°W
- Grid reference: SE980579
- Platforms: 1

Other information
- Status: Disused

History
- Original company: Malton and Driffield Railway
- Pre-grouping: North Eastern Railway
- Post-grouping: London and North Eastern Railway

Key dates
- 19 May 1853: Opened
- 5 June 1950: Closed
Location

Garton railway station (SE980579) was a railway station on the Malton & Driffield Railway (MDR) in the East Riding of Yorkshire, England. It opened on 19 May 1853, and served the village of Garton-on-the-Wolds. It closed on 5 June 1950.

Garton was the least important station on the MDR, handling fewer passengers than any other.

Preceding station	Disused railways	Following station
Wetwang	North Eastern Railway; Malton & Driffield Railway	Driffield
