= Mary Ellen Best =

English painter (1809–1891)

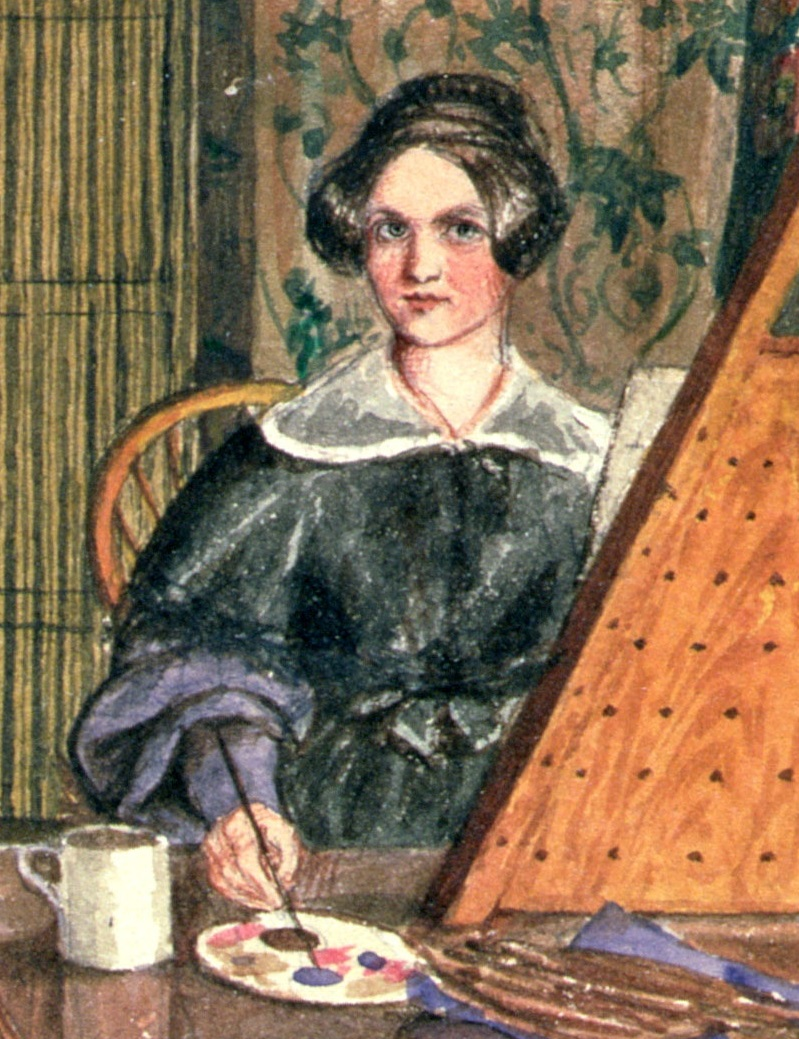
- Self portrait from The Artist at Work
- Born: 1809; York, England
- Died: 1891 (aged 81–82); Darmstadt, Germany
- Spouse: Johan Anton Phillip Sarg

Mary Ellen Best (1809–1891) was an English artist. Most active in the 1830s, she usually worked in water-colour, commonly painting scenes of domestic life.

== Biography ==
=== Early life ===
Best was born in York in 1809, the daughter of doctor Charles Best (associated with Bootham Park Hospital from 1804 to 1815) and his wife, Mary Norcliffe Dalton. Her sister Rosamond Best (c.1808-1881) was also an accomplished artist, often signing her artworks "R.B.".

The Bests grew up on Little Blake Street near the York Minster. In 1815, when Best was aged six, her family moved to Nice in France and stayed there for three years. Mary Ellen Best's father died there in 1817; and the family returned to England in 1818. Mary Ellen's father left £1,000 (equivalent to £74,067 in 2025) to each of the sisters, to be inherited at the age of 21. Best attended a boarding school in her teens, during which time she received lessons from a well-qualified art teacher, George Haugh. Like many middle-class women, she was educated in painting and drawing for leisurely pleasure and to attract a suitable husband. However, she achieved a level of success above that of an amateur and she decided to continue her artistic pursuits.

=== Later life ===
After 1828, she left boarding school and started to demonstrate her dedication to art. She was tutored by George Haugh (1755–1827), an art exhibitor. She continued her art in York, her hometown, and between 1830 and 1836, her most active years as an artist, Best exhibited at venues in London, Leeds, Newcastle, York and Liverpool. In 1830, one of her still lifes was awarded a silver medal from the London Society for the Encouragement of Arts, Manufactures and Commerce (now the Royal Society of Arts) as "the best original composition, painted in oil or water-colours ... by persons under the age of twenty-one." During 1834, the height of her artistic life, she visited Frankfurt, Germany, where she developed her skills further and sold more paintings.

In 1840 Best married Johann Anton Phillip Sarg, a schoolteacher who would have had access to considerably fewer funds than Best. Best's mother was a part of the Norcliffe family, who owned the Langton Hall estate. This meant that on her father's death she inherited a substantial fortune. It has been suggested that her inherited wealth was the reason Best withdrew from her artistic career in the 1850s.

During their marriage, the couple had three children, who she occasionally painted, namely Francis Charles Anton Sarg (21 December 1840 – 31 December 1921), Caroline Elisabeth Sarg (later Scriba, born 18 January 1842) and James Frederick Sarg (16 August 1843 – 1917).

Her two sons, sometimes referred to as Frank (or Franz) and Frederick (or Fred) both moved to Guatemala in later life, and eventually became involved in export business based from Coban as Sarg Hrnos (i.e. Sarg Brothers), especially of Coffee. The eldest brother later became diplomatic consul representing Germany in Guatemala whereafter his son Anthony Frederick Sarg moved to the United States and became famous as a puppeteer and illustrator known as Tony Sarg.

Best died in 1891 in Darmstadt.

== Artworks ==
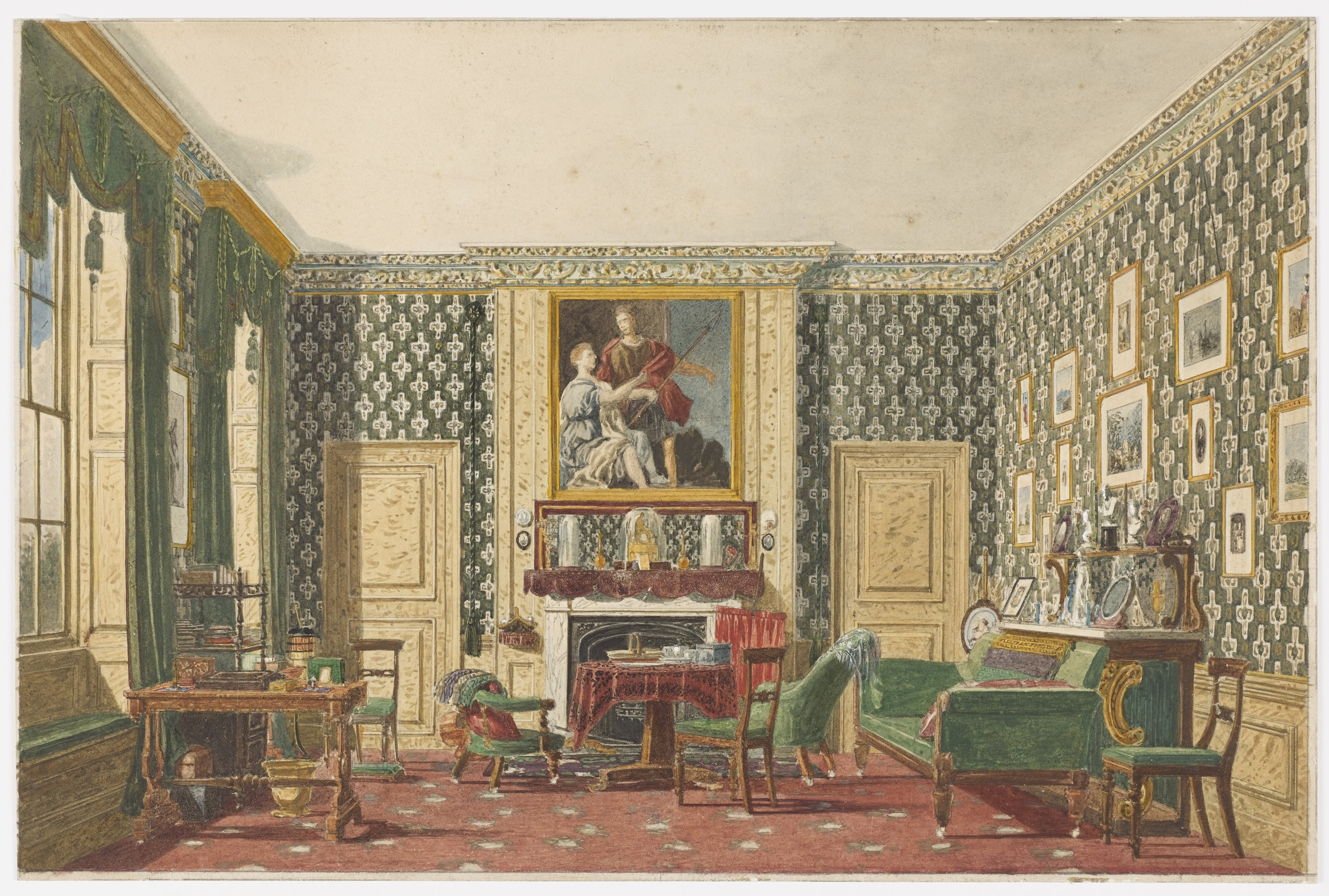
An Interior, a drawing by Best, c. 1837–1840

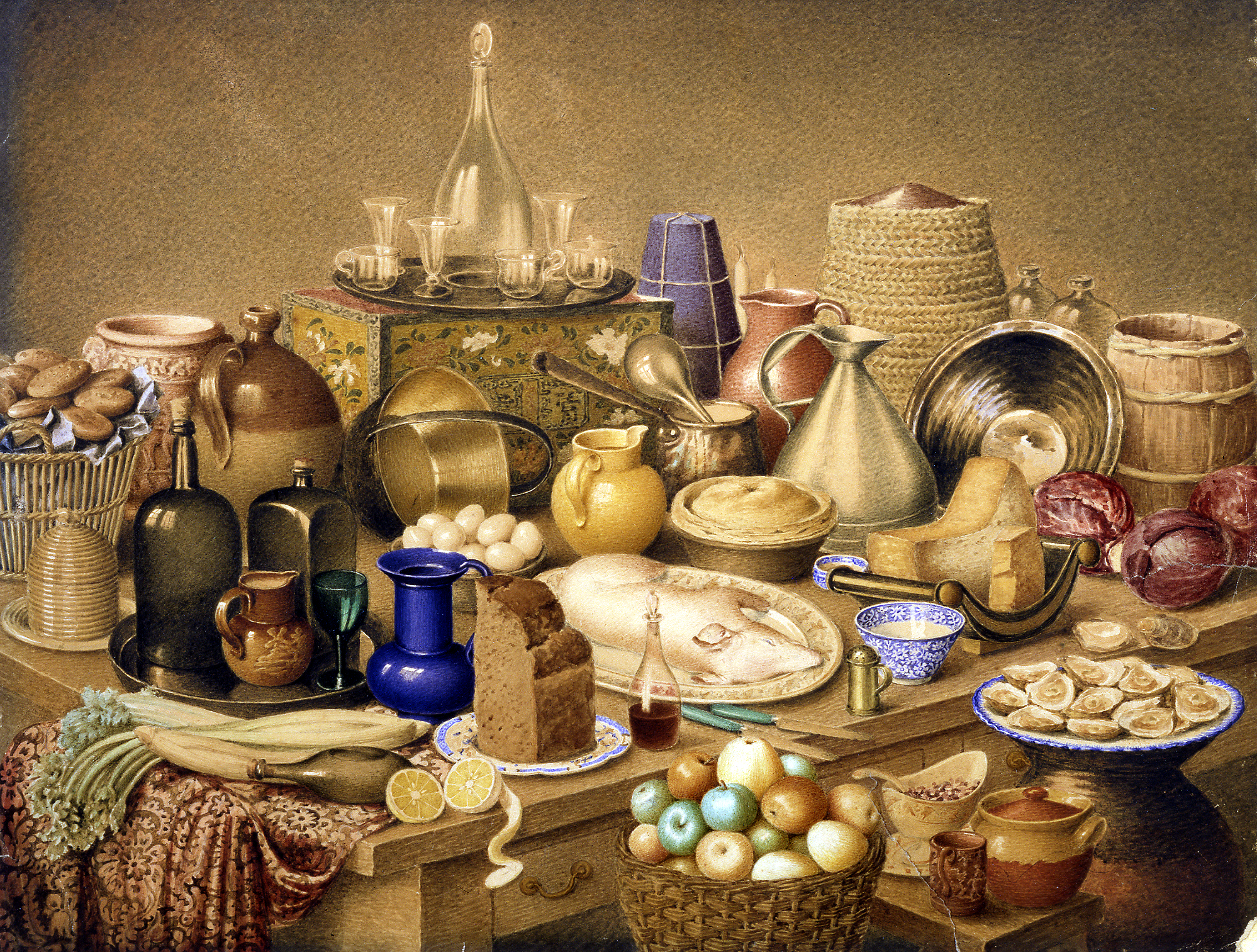
The Sideboard

Contrary to the common practice of her day, Mary Ellen Best was interested in portraying domestic life in her paintings, including families at tables, kitchens and domestic workers. She painted a number of water-colour images of her home in Castlegate, York, including interior portraits of the drawing room, dining room (painted in 1838), and one of herself working in her painting room. She also painted other houses including the drawing room of Naburn Hall, which was then home to George Palmes. After marrying Johan Anton and moving to Nuremberg, Frankfurt, Worms and Darmstadt, she continued to paint the houses they lived in.

Between 1828 and 1840, two-thirds of Best's portraits were commissioned by women. Caroline Davidson, who wrote a biography of Best, calculated that she produced more than 1,500 paintings in total.

Some of Best's drawings were handed down to her great-granddaughter, and 47 were sold in January 1983 in New York City, though York Art Gallery obtained three of them. Others were sold by her great-grandnephew a year later. The paintings are of historical interest as a record of Yorkshire and European life in the 1830s and 1840s.
