= Albert Park, Abingdon =

Park in Abingdon, Oxfordshire, England

Albert Park
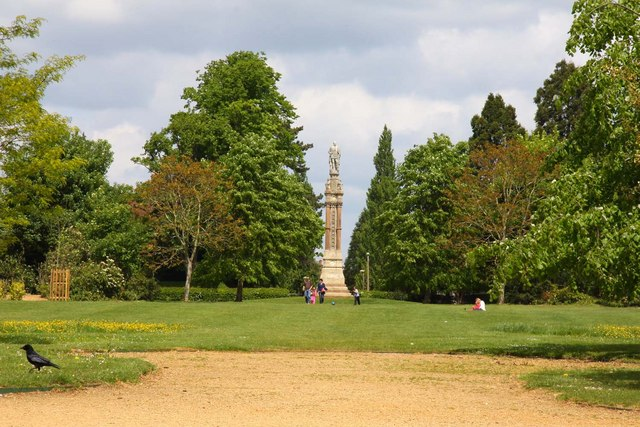
- View of Albert Park looking north to the monument to Prince Albert in the distance.

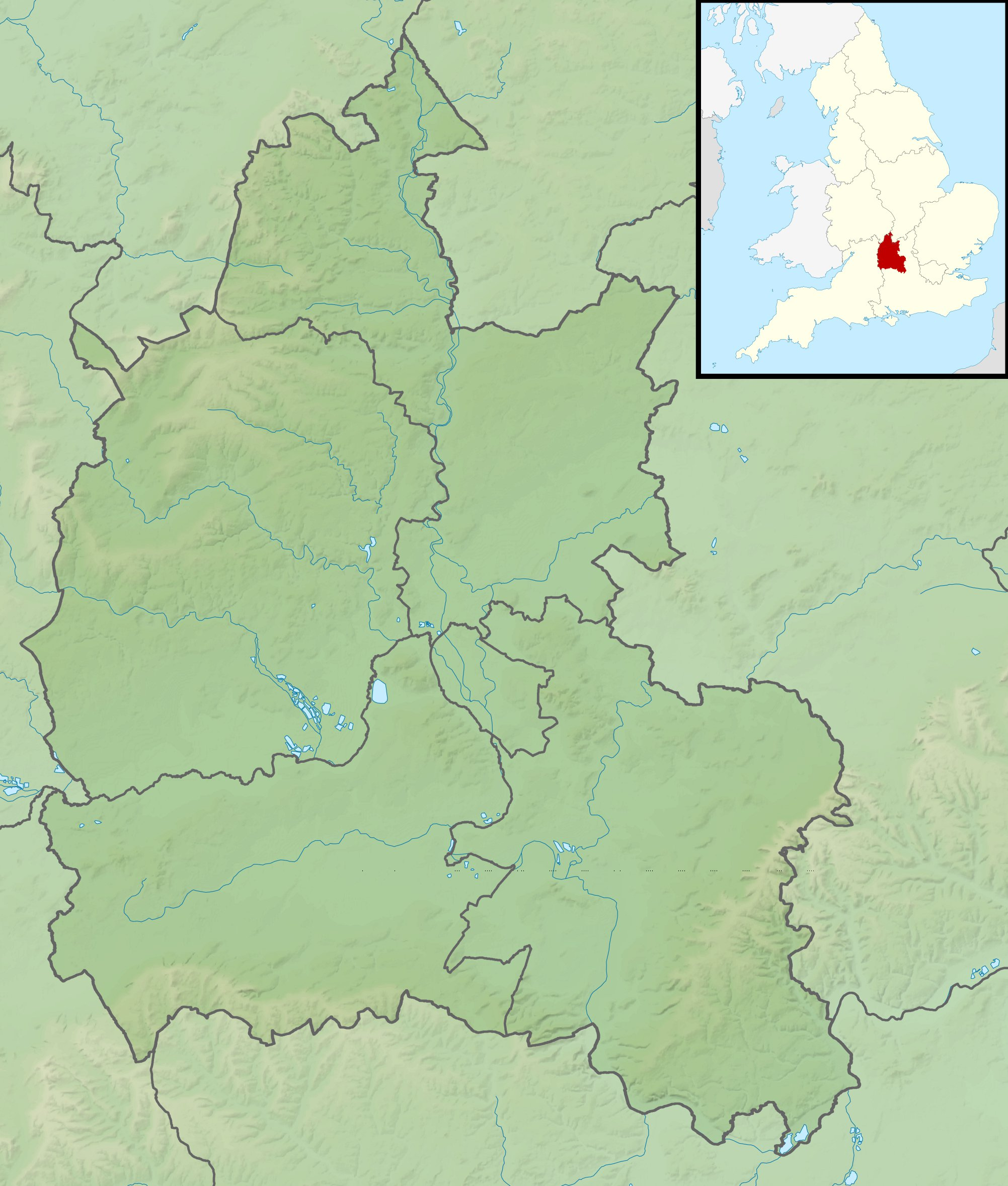
- Location within Oxfordshire
- Interactive map of Albert Park
- Type: landscape garden
- Location: 8 Park Rd, Abingdon OX14 1DS, United Kingdom
- Coordinates: 51.6724°N 1.2915°W
- Created: 1860

Albert Park is a park on Park Road in the northwest of the town of Abingdon, Oxfordshire (formerly in Berkshire), England.

== Overview ==
The park is surrounded by large residential houses and, to the east, Abingdon School, a private school. Abingdon Bowls Club is located in the park. At the northern entrance is a monument to Prince Albert (1819–1861, the husband of Queen Victoria), 48 feet high and designed by John Gibbs of Oxford and erected in 1865.

== History ==
Albert Park was formerly Conduit Field. From 1860, the park together with the surrounding Victorian and Edwardian houses were laid out by Christ's Hospital of Abingdon.

Architects who worked on the estate included Edwin Dolby (1838–1900), his pupil, J. G. Timothy West (1860–1931), and A. B. West (1885–1957), as well as John Gibbs who designed the 1865 stone monument to Prince Albert in the park. This memorial was built by Charles Selby.

== Location ==
Park Crescent runs along the west, north and east sides of the park in a large crescent shape around the park. A spur of Park Crescent continues to the north. The straight Park Road is to the south of the park and also continues to the east and the west. Conduit Road runs south from the southeastern corner of Albert Park. It is named after the water conduit that used to run in line with the current road. This conduit carried spring water from Albert Park to a water fountain in Ock Street.

== Gallery ==
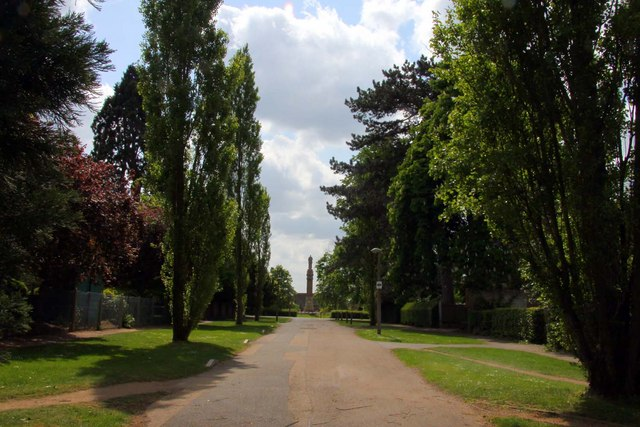
View of Albert Park with the memorial to Prince Albert in the distance

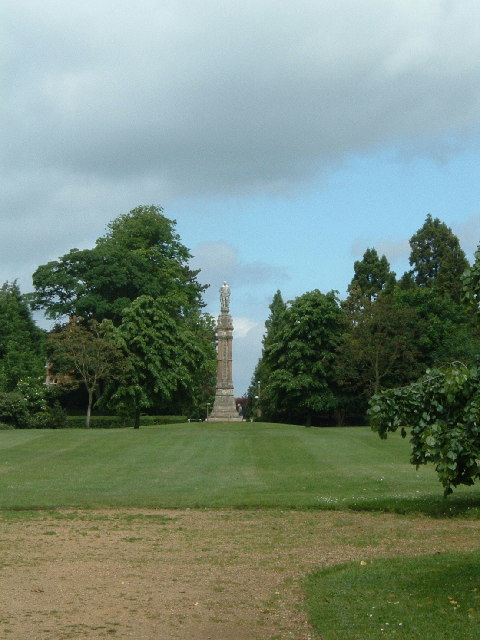
View of the memorial to Prince Albert

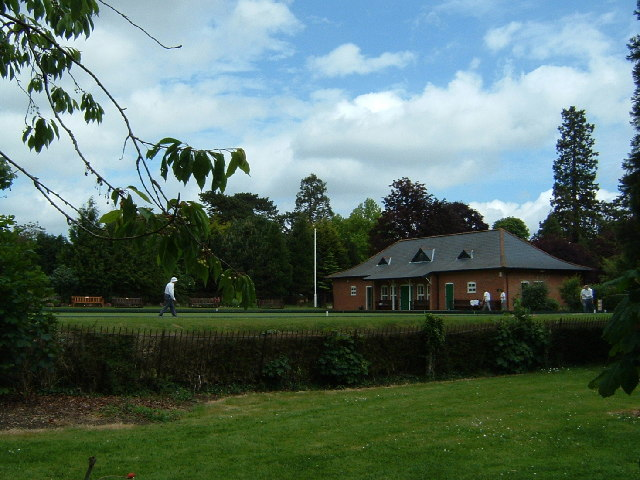
Abingdon Bowls Club in Albert Park

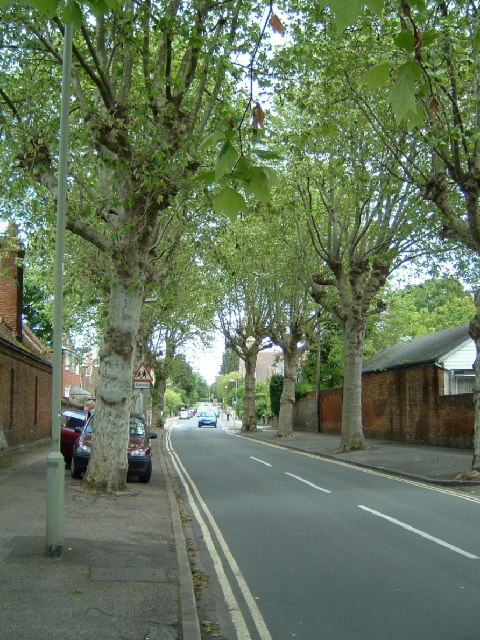
Conduit Road, leading south from the southeastern corner of Albert Park
