= Elmswell, East Riding of Yorkshire =

Hamlet in the East Riding of Yorkshire, England

Coordinates: 54°00′42″N 0°28′56″W

Elmswell
- Location within the East Riding of Yorkshire
- OS grid reference: SE996583
  - London: 175 mi (282 km) S
- Civil parish: Garton on the Wolds
- Unitary authority: East Riding of Yorkshire
- Ceremonial county: East Riding of Yorkshire
- Region: Yorkshire and the Humber
- Country: England
- Sovereign state: United Kingdom
- Post town: DRIFFIELD
- Postcode district: YO25
- Dialling code: 01377
- Police: Humberside
- Fire: Humberside
- Ambulance: Yorkshire
- UK Parliament: Bridlington and The Wolds

Elmswell is a hamlet in the East Riding of Yorkshire, England. It is situated approximately 2 miles (3 km) north-west of the town of Driffield. It lies just to the south of the A166 road.

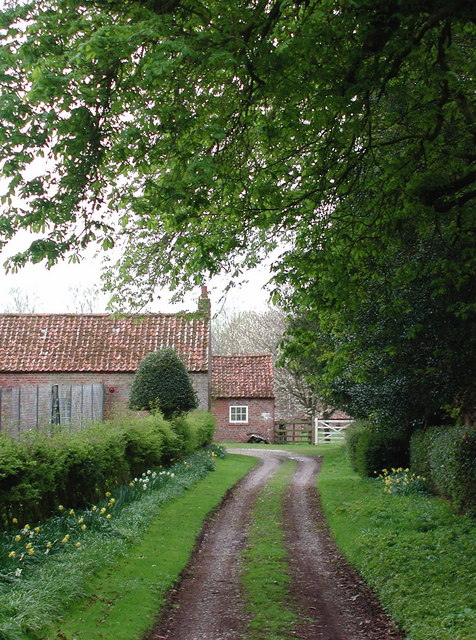
Garden House and Hall Farm

It forms part of the civil parish of Garton on the Wolds.

The name Elmswell derives from the Old Norse personal name Helm and the Old English wella meaning 'spring'.

Elmswell Old Hall was designated a Grade II* listed building in 1966 and is now recorded in the National Heritage List for England, maintained by Historic England.
