= John Gibbs (architect) =

British Gothic Revival architect

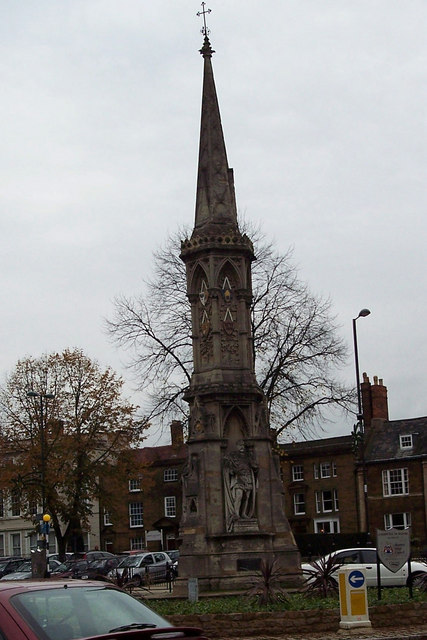
- Banbury Cross in Banbury, north Oxfordshire, designed by Gibbs and built in 1859.
- Born: c. 1827; St Clement's, Oxford
- Occupation: Architect
- Buildings: Wycliffe Hall (54 Banbury Road, Oxford); Banbury Cross, Banbury; Norham Manor Estate, Oxford; monument to Prince Albert, Abingdon; parsonage and village school, South Leigh

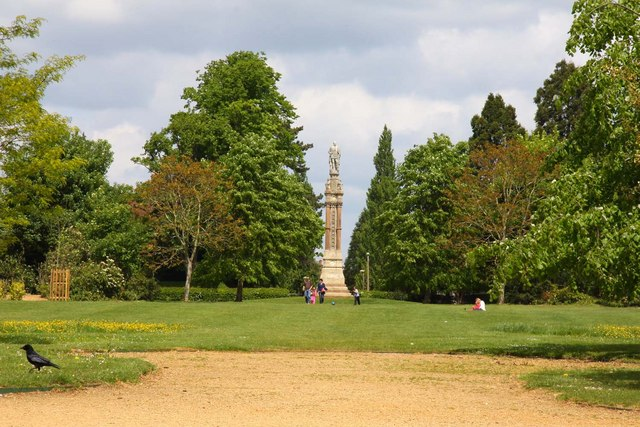
Monument to Prince Albert in Albert Park, Abingdon, designed by Gibbs and erected in 1865.

John Gibbs (c. 1827 – ) was a British Gothic Revival architect based in Wigan, Manchester, and Oxford, England.

== Biography ==
John Gibbs was born in Oxford, the son of James and Alice Gibbs. initially in Oxford but he moved to Wigan in the 1850s and then Manchester in the north of England.

In 1858, he proposed a memorial fountain to commemorate Alfred the Great (purported to be the founder of Oxford University for many years) to be located in the centre of the wide Broad Street, southeast of St Giles', but it was never completed.

The current Banbury Cross was erected in 1859 to a design of Gibbs at the centre of Banbury, Oxfordshire, in commemoration of the marriage of Queen Victoria's eldest daughter to Prince Frederick of Prussia. It is a stone, spire-shaped monument decorated in Gothic form. The cross is 52 feet 6 inches high and is topped with a gilt cross. Statues surrounding the cross were added later in 1911.

Gibbs returned to Oxford in the 1860s and worked in St Giles', central Oxford. In 1865, he designed a monument to Prince Albert in Albert Park, Abingdon, then in Berkshire. This consisted of a statue on a tall pedestal, a total of 48 feet high. He also designed the Sir Tatton Sykes Memorial Tower, in the East Riding of Yorkshire.

In North Oxford, Gibbs designed three large and prominent houses on the west side of Banbury Road (numbers 54, 56, and 58). No. 54 (1866) now forms part of Wycliffe Hall. No. 56 (1867) was built for Henry Hatch, a draper, and was later the long-time residence of Sir Edward Bagnall Poulton, FRS, Hope Professor of Zoology at Oxford University. The building is now used by the Careers Service of Oxford University. No. 58 (also 1867) was built for the chemist, William Walsh. It includes a statue of William of Wykeham by the sculptor W. Forsyth of Worcester in a niche on the external wall of the house. The building is now the Department of Biological Anthropology and Human Sciences at Oxford University.

John Gibbs designed the parsonage and the village school (1871) at South Leigh in Oxfordshire west of Oxford.

Gibbs wrote books promoting the Victorian Gothic architectural style including Designs for Gothic Ornaments (1853) and English Gothic Architecture (1855). He was also the author of a novel, The Old Parish Church: with the Ghost of Merton Hall, published in 1861.

== See also ==
- List of books about Oxford
- List of Oxford architects

== Sources ==
- Hinchcliffe, Tanis (1992). North Oxford. New Haven & London: Yale University Press. pp. 103–105, 152, 205, 217. ISBN 0-14-071045-0.
- Sherwood, Jennifer; Pevsner, Nikolaus (1974). The Buildings of England: Oxfordshire. Harmondsworth: Penguin Books. pp. 319, 403–404, 437, 770–771. ISBN 0-14-071045-0.
