= Thirkleby, Kirby Grindalythe =

Hamlet in North Yorkshire, England

Coordinates: 54.1060°N 0.5945°W

Thirkleby
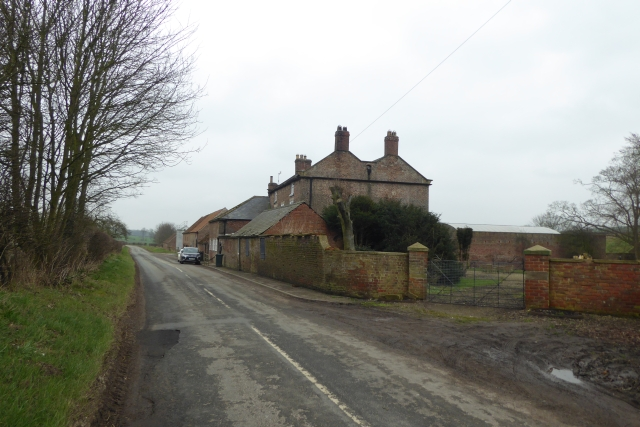
- Thirkleby on the road between Kirby Grindalythe and West Lutton

- Location within North Yorkshire
- Civil parish: Kirby Grindalythe
- Unitary authority: North Yorkshire
- Ceremonial county: North Yorkshire
- Region: Yorkshire and the Humber
- Country: England
- Sovereign state: United Kingdom
- Police: North Yorkshire
- Fire: North Yorkshire
- Ambulance: Yorkshire

Thirkleby is a hamlet in the civil parish of Kirby Grindalythe, in North Yorkshire, England. Roger of Thirkleby (died 1260), a judge and Chief Justice of the Common Pleas, was named after this place.

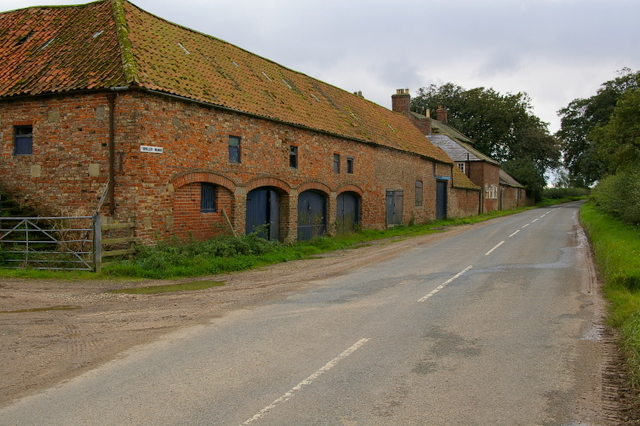
Thirkleby Manor farm

Thirkleby Manor Farmhouse is a grade II listed building, being an 18th-century red-brick two-storey building altered in the early and middle 19th century. The site of a medieval settlement is adjacent.

Thirkleby was formerly a township in the parish of Kirby-Grindalyth, in 1870–72 the township of Thirkleby had a population of 50 people in 9 houses. In 1866 Thirkleby became a separate civil parish, on 1 April 1935 the parish was abolished and merged with Kirby Grindalythe. In 1931 the parish had a population of 49.

Until 1974 it was in the East Riding of Yorkshire. From 1974 to 2023 it was part of the Borough of Scarborough. It is now administered by the unitary North Yorkshire Council.
