= Sir Tatton Sykes, 4th Baronet =

English landowner and stock breeder

Sir Tatton Sykes, 4th Baronet (1772–1863) was an English landowner and stock breeder, known as a patron of horse racing.

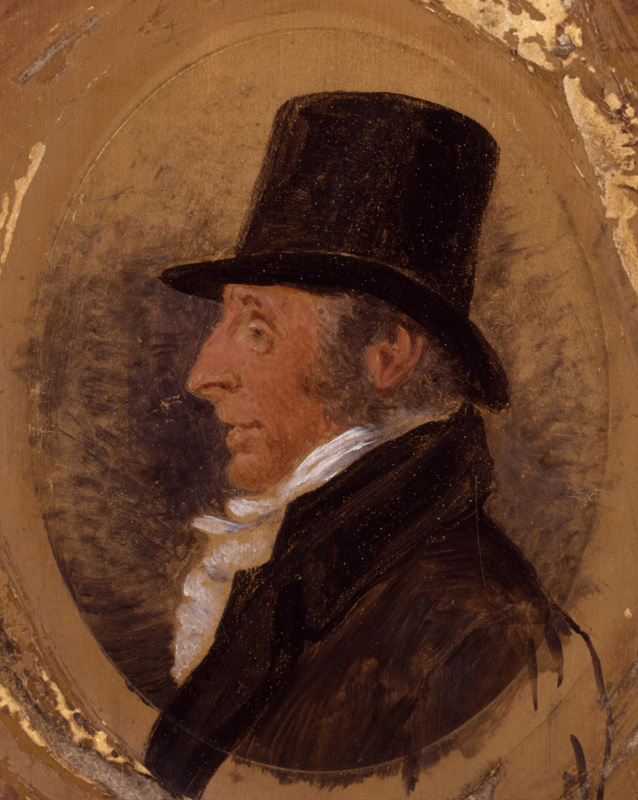
Sir Tatton Sykes, 4th Baronet

== Life ==
A younger brother of Sir Mark Masterman Sykes, he was educated from 1784 at Westminster School. Matriculating at Brasenose College, Oxford, on 10 May 1788, he spent several terms there. For some years he was an articled clerk to Atkinson & Farrar, attorneys in Lincoln's Inn Fields; and then was employed for a period in a banking-house in Kingston upon Hull.

== Sheep farmer ==
In 1803 Sykes began sheep farming and breeding by purchasing ten pure Bakewells from Mr. William Sanday's flock at Holme Pierrepoint. These sheep he kept at Barton, near Malton, where he soon became a ram-letter. At one of Robert Colling's sales he gave 156 guineas for the shearling Ajax. Until nearly eighty he took an annual June ride into the midlands to attend Burgess's, Buckley's, and Stone's sales of stock. In September 1861 he held his own fifty-eighth and last annual sale of sheep.

== Blood-stock ==
While in London Sykes walked from London to Epsom to see Eager's Derby win in 1791; and next year he rode down to see John Bull win. His name first appears in the Racing Calendar as an owner of racehorses in 1803, when his Telemachus ran at Middleham, Yorkshire. In 1805 he rode his own horse Hudibras at Malton, Yorkshire, in a sweepstakes, and won the race. In 1808 he matched his mare Theresa over a four-mile course at Doncaster for five hundred guineas, owners riding, and won. For twenty years after this he from time to time kept a few horses in training at Malton, mainly for the purpose of mounting them himself in races for gentlemen riders. His colours were orange and purple, and the last time he wore them on a winning horse of his own was in 1829, when on All Heart and No Peel he won the Welham Cup at Malton.

Sykes was one of the largest breeders of blood-stock in the kingdom. For some of his stock he gave large prices; for Colsterdale he paid thirteen hundred guineas, and for Fandango at Doncaster in 1860 £3,000. His stud numbered two hundred horses and mares: he bred Grey Momus, The Lawyer, St. Giles, Gaspard, Elcho, Dalby, and Lecturer. His annual sales were well attended, and his stock fetched high prices.

== Baronet ==
On the death of his elder brother on 16 February 1823, Sykes succeeded him as the fourth baronet, and took up his residence at Sledmere House, near Malton. He devoted his time to agriculture, stock-breeding, and fox-hunting. By applying bones as manure he improved the value of the Wold estates belonging to his family, feeding sheep and growing corn where it had been impossible before.

== Other interests ==
For 40 years Sykes was a master of foxhounds, hunting the country from Spurn Point to Coxwold, and paying all the kennel expenses. He was also an expert boxer, coached by Gentleman Jackson and Jem Belcher.

Between 1856 and 1913, 18 rural churches were built, rebuilt or restored in East and North Yorkshire, chiefly in the Wolds, by Sykes, and later his son, the fifth baronet.

== Last years ==
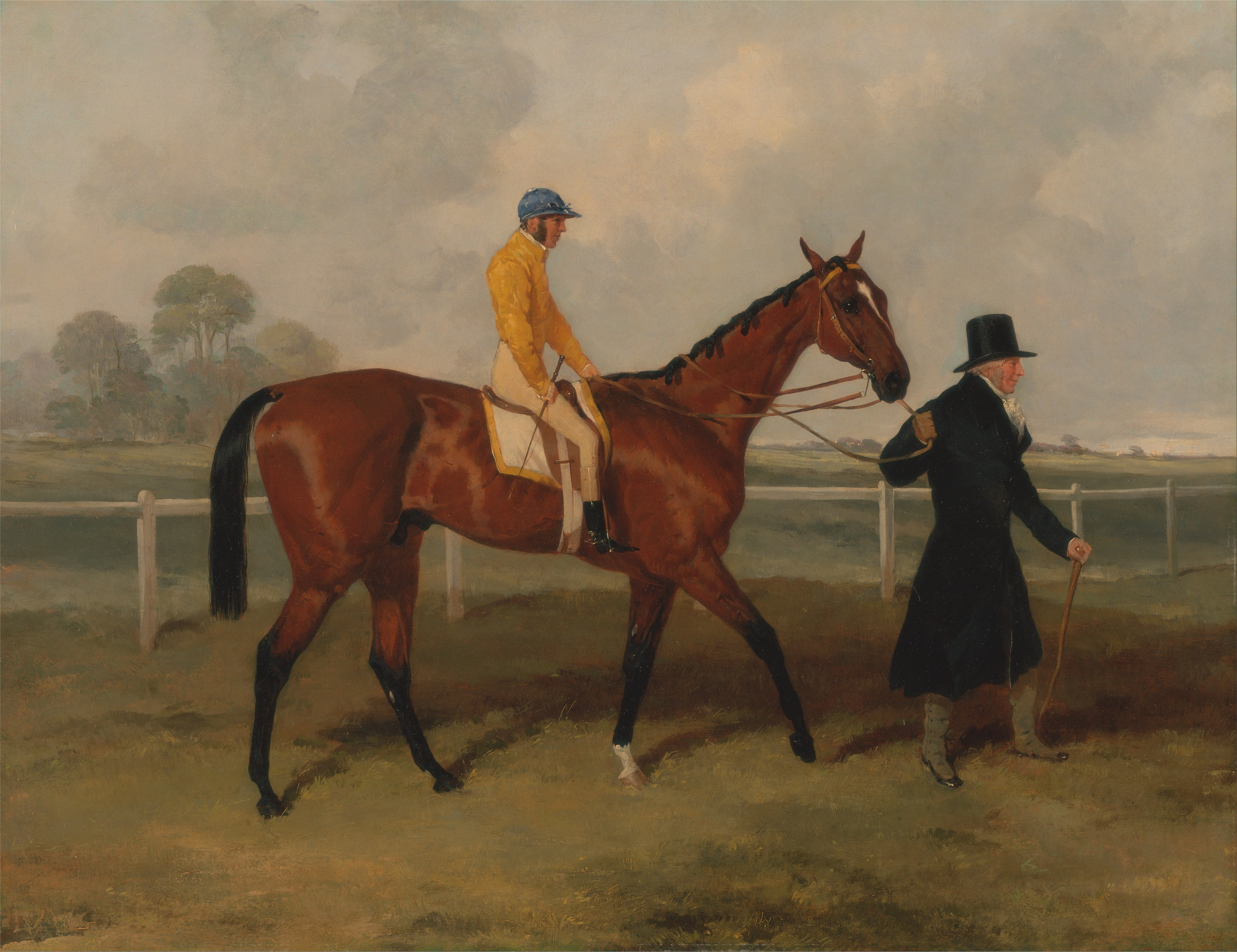
Sir Tatton Sykes the horse is led in by his human namesake the 4th Baronet, after the 1846 St Leger Stakes

Sykes was 74 in 1846 when he led in William Scott's horse—called after him, Sir Tatton Sykes—a winner of the St. Leger Stakes. His last visit to Doncaster was in 1862, to see his seventy-fourth St. Leger. He died at Sledmere on 21 March 1863, and was buried on 27 March in the presence of three thousand persons. A portrait of him was painted by Sir Thomas Lawrence in 1805, and another by Sir Francis Grant in 1848.

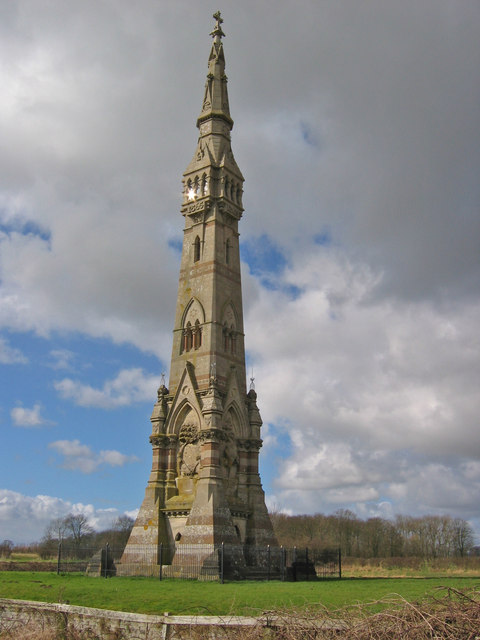
Sir Tatton Sykes Memorial Tower, erected by public subscription

== Family ==
Sykes married, on 19 June 1822, Mary Anne, second daughter of Sir William Foulis, bart. She died on 1 February 1861, leaving Sir Tatton Sykes, 5th Baronet, Christopher Sykes of Brantingham Thorpe, M.P. for the East Riding of Yorkshire, and six daughters. His daughter, Katherine Lucy Sykes, married Hon. Thomas Grenville Cholmondeley (b. 4 Aug 1818, d. 9 Feb 1883).

== Notes ==
Attribution

This article incorporates text from a publication now in the public domain: Lee, Sidney, ed. (1898). "Sykes, Tatton". Dictionary of National Biography. Vol. 55. London: Smith, Elder & Co.

Baronetage of Great Britain
Preceded by Mark Masterman-Sykes	Baronet (of Sledmere); 1823–1863	Succeeded by Tatton Sykes
