= Sir Tatton Sykes, 5th Baronet =

English landowner, racehorse breeder, church-builder and eccentric

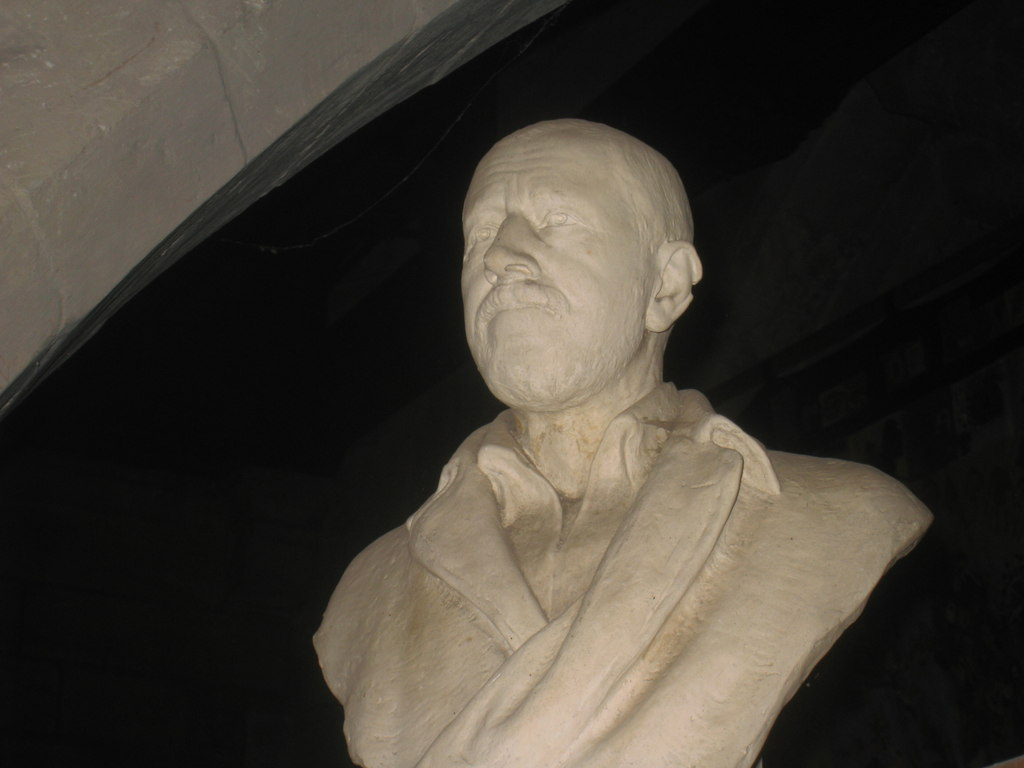
Bust of Sir Tatton Sykes in St Nicholas' Church, Wetwang

Sir Tatton Sykes, 5th Baronet (13 March 1826 – 4 May 1913) was an English landowner, racehorse breeder, church-builder and eccentric; Sykes believed in a constant body temperature and would wear up to six coats at once, discarding them if necessary. He also built houses on his estates without front doors "because he hated to see women gossiping or children playing in the street.

He was the elder son of Sir Tatton Sykes, 4th Baronet, and Mary Ann Foulis, and succeeded to the Sykes baronetcy on his father's death in 1863. His brother was the Conservative MP Christopher Sykes. He lived at Sledmere House, near York and served as Deputy Lieutenant of the East Riding of Yorkshire, and later High Sheriff of Yorkshire for 1869–70.

On 3 August 1874, at the age of 48, he married the novelist Christina Anne Jessica Cavendish-Bentinck (died 1912), daughter of George Augustus Frederick Cavendish-Bentinck and Prudentia Penelope Leslie. His wife was 30 years younger than he, and was later convicted of issuing cheques in her husband's name. They had one son, Sir Tatton 'Mark' Sykes (1879–1919).

Sykes died in May 1913 at age 87, and was succeeded in the baronetcy by his son. He owned 34,000 acres (14,000 ha) of land in the East Riding of Yorkshire.

== Churches ==
Between 1856 and 1913, 18 rural churches were built, rebuilt or restored in East and North Yorkshire, chiefly in the Yorkshire Wolds, by Sykes and his father, the fourth baronet.

Sykes worked with the architects C. Hodgson Fowler, G. E. Street and Temple Moore. The churches included St Michael and All Angels, Garton on the Wolds, St Edith at Bishop Wilton and St Andrew’s at Weaverthorpe. Sykes has been described as "England’s greatest 19th century church builder".

Baronetage of Great Britain
Preceded by Tatton Sykes	Baronet (of Sledmere); 1863–1913	Succeeded by Mark Sykes
