= List of windmills in the East Riding of Yorkshire =

This is a list of windmills in the East Riding of the English county of Yorkshire.

== Beverley ==
Location	Name of mill and grid reference	Type	Maps	First mention or built	Last mention or demise	Photograph
Beverley	Beverley Westwood			1558	1558	
Beverley	Beverley Westwood	Post		1625	Demolished 1868	
Beverley	Far Mill; TA 021 390	Post	1775	1706	Demolished 1803	
Beverley	Far Mill; Black Mill; High Mill; Baitson's Mill; TA 021 390	tower		1803	Windmill World	
Beverley	Victoria Mill; TA 020 382	Tower			Truncated; Windmill World	
Beverley	Union Mill; Anti-mill; TA 022 385	Tower		1802	Truncated 1897; Windmill World	
Beverley	Hither Mill	post		1620	blown down c. 1714	
Beverley	Hither Mill	Post		1741	Demolished 1773	
Beverley	Hither Mill; First Mill; Low Mill	Tower	1775	1773	Demolished 1856	
Beverley	Lowson's Mill; TA 027 386	Tower		1801		
Beverley	Parks Mill	Tower		c. 1820		
Beverley	Queensgate Whiting Works			1837		
Beverley	Catterson's Mill					
Beverley	Crathorne's Mill	Tower		1845	1868	
Beverley	Victoria Mill	Tower		1837	1846	
Beverley	Butt Close Mill; Fishwick's Mill	Post		1761	Demolished 1861	
Beverley	Grovehill			Late 16th century	Demolished mid-17th century	
Beverley	Norwood			1443	Late 16th century	
Beverley	Ridings Fields (two mills)			15th century	15th century	

== Hull ==
Location	Name of mill and grid reference	Type	Maps	First mention or built	Last mention or demise	Photograph
Hull	Newland Mill, Beverley Road	Tower			Demolished 1881, machinery to Trusthorpe Mill, Mablethorpe, Lincolnshire	
Hull		Tower		1787		
Hull		Tower		1801		
Hull	Damson Lane Mill			1843	1912	
Hull	Stoneferry (image, centre)		1775	1775	1841	
Hull	Stoneferry (2nd mill) (image, left)			1841	1841	
Hull	Stoneferry Sawmill			1819	1819	
Hull	Anlaby Road Oil Mill			1830s	1830s	
Hull	Stepney Mill, Beverley Road	tower		1883	1883	
Hull	Humber Bank Mill	Tower		1770		
Hull	Cent-per-Cent Street Mill	Smock		1820s	1820s	
Hull	Brickworks	Hollow post				
Hull	Blundell's Mill, Spring Row	Tower		1829	1829	
Hull	Marfleet Mill			1595	1595	
Hull	Sculcoates Mill			1558	1558	
Hull	Myton (two mills)			1293	1345	
Hull	Wyke upon Hull			1293	1293	
Hull	Hull Street Mill, North Gate					
Hull	Southcoates Lane Mill	Tower		1846	1866	
Hull	Holderness Road Mill	Tower				
Hull	Subscription Mill; Anti-Mill, Holderness Road	Tower		1801	1855	
Hull	Waddingham's Mill, Holderness Road	Tower		1855	1859	
Hull	Eyre's Mill, Holderness Road; TA 120 300	Tower		c. 1820	Windmill World	
Hull	Holderness Road (6th mill)			1846	1846	
Hull	Holderness Road (7th mill)			1846	1846	
Hull	Holderness Road (8th mill)			1846	1846	
Hull	Holderness Road (9th mill)			1846	1846	
Hull	Holderness Road (10th mill)			1846	1846	

== Other locations ==
Location	Name of mill and grid reference	Type	Maps	First mention or built	Last mention or demise	Photograph
Aldbrough	Bewick Manor			14th century	14th century	
Aldbrough	Old Mill			1685	c. 1905	
Aldbrough	Carlton			Mid-16th century	Mid-16th century	
Aldbrough	Aldbrough Mill			c. 1764	c. 1930	
Anlaby		Post	1775	1657	Demolished 1909	
Anlaby	Providence Mill	Tower	1826; 1853	1805	1853, gone by 1889	
Arnold				1588	1588	
Arram				13th century	13th century	
Asselby	Asselby Mill	Post				
Atwick	Atwick Mill	Midlands post		1828	c. 1900	
Bainton	Bainton Mill; SE 964 527	Tower		1818	Windmill World	
Barmby on the Marsh				1295	1295	
Barmston				16th century	1722	
Beeford				Late 12th century	Moved to Dringhoe late 14th century	
Beeford	Beeford Mill; TA 130 535	Post		Late 16th century	Demolished 1820	
Beeford	Beeford Mill; TA 130 535	Tower		1820	Windmill World	
Bempton	Sewerby Mill; TA 189 714	Tower			Windmill World	
Bilton				16th century	17th century	
Bishop Burton	South Mill; SE 993 393	Tower			Windmill World	
Bishop Burton	SE 993 407	Post				
Bishop Wilton	Bishop Wilton Mill; SE 790 550	Tower		1829	Windmill World	
Brandesburton				1223	1223	
Brandesburton				Late 18th century	Late 18th century	
Bridlington	Bridge Mill (Bridlington Priory)			1539	Burnt down 1539	
Bridlington	Duke's Mill; TA 180 688	Tower		1800	Windmill World	
Broomfleet	Brickworks	Post				
Buckton	Buckton Mill; TA 180 715	Tower			Windmill World	
Burton Agnes				1265	1265	
Burton Constable				1294	1294	
Burton Constable				17th century	Demolished c. 1828	
Burton Fleming				Late 13th century	Late 13th century	
Burton Pidsea				1260s	1260s	
Burton Pidsea	South Field Mill		1772	1616	1772, gone by 1852	
Burton Pidsea	Burton Pidsea Mill; TA 244 309	Tower		1834	Windmill World	
Catwick	Hildyard Mill			Late 15th century	Late 15th century	
	Catwick Mill	Midlands post	1722; 1829	1722	Demolished 1911	
Coniston	South Field			18th century	18th century	
Cottingham	Low Mill	Tower		1780		
Cottingham	North Mill	Tower		1813	Demolished 1900	
Drewton				1212	1212	
Driffield	North End Mill	Tower		1819	Demolished c. 1882	
Dringhoe	Cauce estate			1325	1325	
Dringhoe				Late 14th century	16th century	
Dringhoe				c. 1800	1905	
Easington				1260	1260	
Easington	Easington Mill	Tower				
East Cowick	East Cowick Mill; SE 665 212	Composite			Windmill World	
Ellerby	St Quintins			1223	1223	
Ellerby	West Field			1596	1596	
Ellerby	Ellerby Mill; NZ 800 140	Tower		1855	Windmill World	
Ellerker	Ellerker Mill	Tower		1822	Demolished April 1913	
Ellerton	Ellerton Mill; SE 712 399	Tower			Windmill World	
Etherdwick				1600	Demolished c. 1753	
Etton	Etton Mill	Sunk post		1315	1712	
Etton	Etton Mill; SE 981 428	Post	1775	1775	Demolished c. 1780	
Etton	Etton Mill; SE 981 428	Tower		c. 1780	Windmill World	
Fimber		Sunk post				
Fimber	(later mill on same site)	Sunk post				
Flamborough		Post				
Flinton				Early 16th century	Early 16th century	
Fosham				1577	1578	
Foston on the Wolds	Foston Mill; TA 092 548	Tower		1820	Windmill World	
Fraisthorpe				c. 1212	c. 1212	
Ganstead				1334	1334	
Ganstead				1602	1602	
Ganstead	Ganstead Mill	Midlands post		1796	Demolished 1909	
Garton				c. 1600	c. 1600	
Garton	Blue Mill; TA 261 537	Tower		Mid-1820s	Windmill World	
Gilberdyke	Union Mill	Tower		c. 1800		
Goole	Timm's Mill; SE 740 239	Tower		Late 18th or early 19th century	Windmill World	
Goole	Herons's Mill; SE 750 237	Tower			Windmill World	
Goole	Goole Fields Mill; SE 758 213	Tower			Windmill World	
Goole	Greenfield's Mill	Tower		1840		
Goxhill				1325	1325	
Great Cowden				1303	1337	
Grindale				1295	1295	
Halsham				1294	1294	
Hemingbrough				1276	1276	
Hemingbrough		Post	1775	1609	1913	
Hessle	Cliff Mill; TA 022 254	Tower		1806	Windmill World	
Hessle	Hessle Mill	Tower		1791	1791	
Hollym				1326	1326	
Hollym	Hollym Mill	Post		Late 18th century	1820s	
Hook	Cemetery Mill	Tower				
Hornsea	East Mill			1539	1610	
Hornsea	West Mill			1539	1610	
Hornsea	Beck Mill				Blown down 1732	
Hornsea	Atwick Road Mill; TA 197 479		1772	1772	Demolished 1820	
Hornsea	Hornsea Mill; TA 197 479	Tower		1820	1921; Windmill World	
Hornsea	Brickworks, (site later occupied by Hornsea Pottery)	Tower		1865		
Hornsea	Hornsea Burton			1584	1663	
Howden	Hail Mill; SE 754 277	Tower		Late 18th or early 19th century	Windmill World	
Howden	Howden Brickworks	Tower		1873		
Hutton Cranswick	Hutton Cranswick Mill; TA 023 530	Tower		Late 18th or early 19th century	Windmill World	
Keyingham	Old Mill; TA 244 256	Post		18th century	Demolished early 19th century	
Keyingham	Old Mill; West Mill; TA 244 256	Tower		1813	Windmill World	
Keyingham	New Mill; East Mill; TA 254 251	Tower		1828	Windmill World	
Kilham	Kilham Mill; TA 060 642	Tower		1809	Windmill World	
Kilpin	Kilpin Windpump; SE 763 275				Windmill World	
Langtoft	Langtoft Mill; TA 005 680	Tower		1860	Windmill World	
Lelley	Lelley Mill; TA 219 326			1712	Demolished c 1776	
Lelley	Lelley Mill; TA 219 326	Tower		1776	Demolished c. 1790	
Lelley	Lelley Mill; TA 219 326	Tower		1790	Windmill World	
Leven	Mill Hill Mill			1608	1608	
Leven	New Mill; TA 117 453	Tower		1847	c. 1900, Later truncated Windmill World	
Leven	Canal Head Mill	Tower		1790	1890	
Leven	South Field Mill	Post	1772	1754	1842	
Leven	Wright's Mill	Tower		1807	Demolished 1919	
Lissett				1353	1353	
Little Cowden				c. 1290	Gone by 1401	
Lockington	Lockington Mill	Tower		c. 1820		
Long Riston	The Hildyards			1322	1322	
Long Riston				1540s	1670	
Mappleton	Mappleton Manor			17th century	17th century	
Mappleton	Mappleton Mill; TA 224 437	Tower		1798	Windmill World	
Market Weighton	Bark Mill					
Market Weighton	Market Weighton Mill	Tower			Demolished c. 1970	
Molescroft				1448	16th century	
Molescroft	Mill Hill Mill			16th century	1627	
Nafferton	Nafferton Mill; TA 059 606	Tower		1829	Windmill World	
Newbald	Newbald Mill	Tower				
New Ellerby	New Ellerby Mill; TA 170 389	Tower			Windmill World	
Newport	Newport Mill	Tower		1797		
North Ferriby		Post				
North Frodingham				16th century	16th century	
North Frodingham	North Frodingham Mill	Tower		1816	c. 1915	
North Howden	Howden Brickyard; SE 754 310	Tower			Windmill World	
North Howden	Howden Brickyard (2nd mill)		1855	1855	1855	
Osgodby	SE 64386 33091	Tower		1723	Partially demolished by 1934 now completely gone.	
Out Newton				1276	1276	
Owstwick	(two mills)			13th century	13th century	
Owstwick				1588	1588	
Patrington		Sunk post		1340	Blown down 1426	
Patrington		Sunk post		1426	1426	
Patrington	East Mill; Goodrick's Mill; TA 320 223	Tower		1845	Windmill World	
Patrington	Haven Mill; TA 308 219	Tower		1810	Truncated; Windmill World	
Patrington	Black Mill; TA 320 221	Tower				
Preston	Preston Mill	Post			Demolished 1813	
Preston	Preston Mill	Tower		1813		
Ravenser Odd				1260	1260	
Ringbrough				1351	1351	
Risby	Risby Mill	Post		1721	1721	
Rise				Early 14th century	1624	
Rise		Post		Early 18th century	Demolished c. 1860	
Roos				1403	16th century	
Roos	West Field Mill		1772	1772	Demolished c. 1908	
Routh	Ros Manor			1278	14th century	
Routh	Sir Amand's Manor			Mid-14th century	17th century	
Routh		Hollow post		1693	1770	
Rudston				1296	1296	
Ryehill			14th century	1685, gone by 1748		
Ryehill			1772	1915		
Scalby				1661	1661	
Scalby	Scalby Mill	Tower				
Seaton Ross	New Mill; SE 776 422	Tower		1839	Windmill World	
Seaton Ross	Common Mill; Fisher's Mill; SE 776 421	Tower				
Seaton Ross	Old Mill; SE 774 417	Tower		Late 18th or early 19th century	Windmill World	
Seaton Ross	SE 774 418	Post				
Seaton Ross	Preston's Mill; SE 774 418	Tower			Demolished 1953	
Sewerby	Sewerby Mill	Tower				
Sheriff Hutton				1282	1628	
Skidby	Two Mills Mill			1388	Demolished 1626	
Skidby	Hindercroft Mill			1655	Demolished 1688	
Skidby	Skidby Mill; TA 020 333	Post		1764	Demolished 1821	
Skidby	Skidby Mill; TA 020 333	Tower		1821	Windmill World	
Skipsea	Cleeton Manor			c. 1260	c. 1260	
Skipsea				1396	15th century	
Skipsea	North Field			c. 1550	c. 1550	
Skipsea	Upton			Early 19th century	Demolished c. 1895	
Skipsea	Park Farm, Upton			1820s	1820s	
Skirlaugh	Skirlaugh Mill	Midlands Post		1750	Demolished 1944	
Speeton	Speeton Mill	Tower				
Sproatley				Late 13th century	1391	
Sproatley	Sproatley Mill			1820	c. 1895	
Sutton-on-Hull	Hastings Manor			1641	1641	
Sutton-on-Hull				Early 18th century	Burnt down 1884	
Swanland	Swanland Mill	Tower		1893	Demolished 1908	
Swine				1440s	1440s	
Swine	Mill Field			1618	1618	
Swine	Swine Pools			c. 1735	c. 1735	
Thearne				1625	1625	
Thearne	Thearne Mill	Tower		1815	1913	
Thwing		Sunk post		c. 1290		
Tickton				1622	1660s	
Ulrome				1717	1717, gone by 1765	
Walkington	Walkington Mill	Post			Demolished 1850	
Walkington	Walkington Mill	Tower		1850		
Wawne	Meaux Abbey			Mid-13th century	1390s	
Wawne	North of village			1546	1612, gone by 1672	
Wawne	Wawne Carrs (two mills)			1675	18th century	
Waxholme	Black Mill; TA 326 293	Tower			Windmill World	
Weedley				1185	1185	
Welwick				1349	1349	
Wetwang	Wetwang Mill	Midlands post				
Wheldrake	Wheldrake windmill	Post		1719	1850	
Wilberfoss	Wilberfoss Mill	Post			Demolished 1839	
Wilberfoss	Wilberfoss Mill	Tower		1839	Demolished c. 1970	
Witham	Witham Mill	Vertical axis mill		1816	1816	
Withernwick				1304	1304	
Withernwick	West of village			1610	1612, gone by 1763	
Withernwick	East of village	Post		1763	Demolished 1890s	
Wold Newton	Wold Newton Mill	Post				
Wressle	Wressle Mill; SE 710 312	Tower		1827	Windmill World	
Yokefleet	Mill Farm Mill; SE 821 237	Tower			Windmill World	

== Maps ==
- 1772 T Jeffereys
- 1775 Jackson
- 1829 A Bryant
- 1855 Ordnance Survey

== Notes ==
Mills in bold are still standing, known building dates are indicated in bold. Text in italics indicates that the information is not confirmed, but is likely to be the case stated.

== Sources ==
Unless otherwise indicated, the source for all entries is:-Gregory, Roy (1985). East Yorkshire Windmills. Cheddar: Charles Skilton Ltd. ISBN 0-284-98721-2. or the linked Windmill World page.
