= New Mill =

New Mill or Newmill may refer to:

== United Kingdom ==
=== Places ===
- New Mill, Cornwall
- New Mill, former name of Miskin, Rhondda Cynon Taf
- New Mill, an area of Tring, Hertfordshire, England
- Newmill, a village near Keith, Moray
- Newmill-on-Teviot, a location near Hawick, Scottish Borders
- New Mill, West Yorkshire
- New Mill, a hamlet near Milton Lilbourne, Wiltshire
- New Mill End, Bedfordshire
  - Luton Hoo railway station, previously called New Mill End railway station

=== Windmills ===
- New Mill, Attleborough, a windmill in Norfolk
- New Mill, Badingham, a windmill in Suffolk
- New Mill, Beckley, a windmill in East Sussex
- New Mill, Chiddingly, a windmill in East Sussex
- New Mill, Coseley, a windmill in Staffordshire
- New Mill, Cross in Hand, a windmill in East Sussex
- New Mill, East Ruston, a windmill in Norfolk
- New Mill, Gorefield, a windmill in Cambridgeshire
- New Mill, Great Coggeshall, a windmill in Essex
- New Mill, Henfield, a windmill in West Sussex
- New Mill, Hornchurch, a windmill in Essex
- New Mill, Keyingham a windmill in the East Riding of Yorkshire
- New Mill, Leven a windmill in the East Riding of Yorkshire
- New Mill, Lydd, a windmill in Kent
- New Mill, Northbourne, a windmill in Kent
- New Mill, North Kelsey, a windmill in Lincolnshire
- New Mill, North Walsham, a windmill in Norfolk
- New Mill, Plumstead, a windmill in Norfolk
- New Mill, Preston next Wingham, a windmill in Kent
- New Mill, Prittlewell, a windmill in Essex
- New Mill, Rottingdean, a windmill in East Sussex
- New Mill, Rye, a windmill in East Sussex
- New Mill, Seaton Ross, a windmill in the East Riding of Yorkshire
- New Mill, Stebbing, a windmill in Essex
- New Mill, Swingfield, a windmill in Kent
- New Mill, Tadworth, a windmill in Surrey
- New Mill, Tring, a Hertfordshire
- New Mill, Willesborough, a windmill in Kent
- New Mill, Worlingworth, a windmill in Suffolk
  - Highdown New Mill, Angmering, a windmill in West Sussex
  - Glover's New Mill, Blean, a windmill in Kent
  - New Mill Piece Mill, Brandon, a windmill in Suffolk
  - Lashmar's New Mill, Brighton, a windmill in East Sussex
  - Ruiton New Mill, Sedgeley, a windmill in Staffordshire
  - Tivoli New Mill, St Leonard's, a windmill in East Sussex

=== Watermills ===
- New Mill, Crowborough, a watermill on the Warren Brook, East Sussex
- New Mill, Hollingbourne, a watermill on the River Len, Kent
- New Mill, Sissinghurst, a watermill on a tributary of the Hammer Stream, Kent

=== Cotton Mills ===
- New Mill, Ancoats, Lancashire
- New Mill, Eccleston, Lancashire
- New Mill, part of the Murrays' Mills complex in Manchester, Lancashire
- New Mill, Reddish North, near Stockport, Cheshire
  - Pear New Mill, in Stockport, Cheshire

=== Other ===
- Newmill (horse), a Thoroughbred racehorse
- New Mill Offset railway station, later renamed Newmill, then Carmont

== United States ==
- New Mill and Depot Building, Hawthorne Woolen Mill, Greenwich, CT, listed on the NRHP in Connecticut
  - New Bremen Mill, Tinley Park, a windmill in Illinois

== See also ==
- New Mills (disambiguation)
