= Elstronwick =

Village and civil parish in the East Riding of Yorkshire, England

Coordinates: 53°46′19″N 0°08′15″W

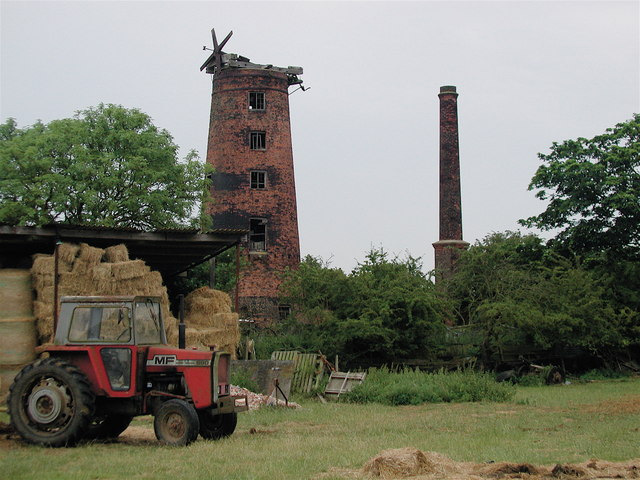
- Lelley Mill, Elstronwick

- Location within the East Riding of Yorkshire
- Population: 298 (2011 census)
- OS grid reference: TA230321
  - London: 155 mi (249 km) S
- Civil parish: Elstronwick
- Unitary authority: East Riding of Yorkshire
- Ceremonial county: East Riding of Yorkshire
- Region: Yorkshire and the Humber
- Country: England
- Sovereign state: United Kingdom
- Post town: HULL
- Postcode district: HU12
- Dialling code: 01964
- Police: Humberside
- Fire: Humberside
- Ambulance: Yorkshire
- UK Parliament: Beverley and Holderness

Elstronwick is a village and civil parish in the East Riding of Yorkshire, England, in an area known as Holderness. It is situated approximately 3.5 miles (6 km) north-east of the town of Hedon and 1.5 miles (2.4 km) north-west of the village of Burton Pidsea.

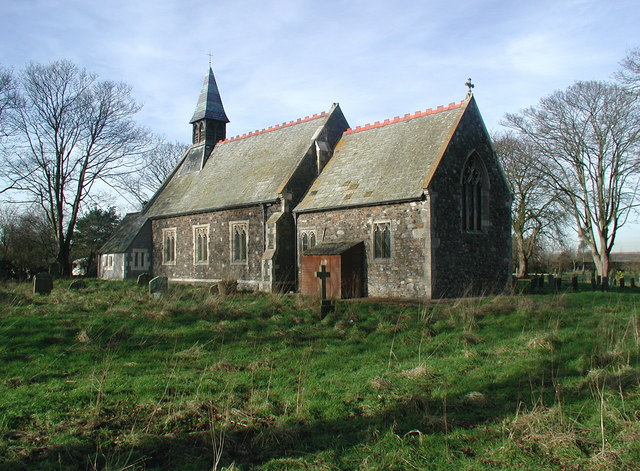
St Lawrence's Church, Elstronwick

The civil parish is formed by the villages of Elstronwick and Lelley together with the hamlet of Danthorpe. According to the 2011 UK census, Elstronwick parish had a population of 298, an increase on the 2001 UK census figure of 287.

The name Elstronwick derives from the Old English Aelfstanwīc meaning 'Aelfstan's trading settlement'.

St Lawrence's Church, Elstronwick on Front Lane is designated a Grade II listed building and is now recorded in the National Heritage List for England, maintained by Historic England. There is also a chapel. A further Grade II listed building is Elstronwick Hall.

Village amenities include a small playing field.

In 1823 Baines's History, Directory and Gazetteer of the County of York gave Elstronwick's name as 'Elsternwick'. The village at the time was in the parish of Humbleton and in the Wapentake of Holderness. There was a chapel of ease, "apparently of great antiquity", and a free school. The village had a population of 154, with occupations including six farmers, two wheelwrights, a blacksmith, a shoemaker, and the licensed victualler of The Crown and Anchor public house. Also directory-listed was a school mistress, two gentlemen and a foreman. Once a week a carrier operated between the village and Hull. The Crown and Anchor closed and was converted into cottages c. 2015.

== See also ==
- Listed buildings in Elstronwick
