= Danthorpe =

Hamlet in the East Riding of Yorkshire, England

Coordinates: 53.773961°N 0.112327°W

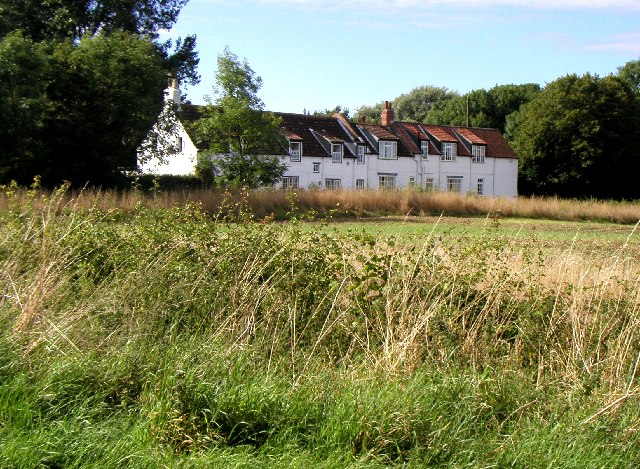
- Danthorpe in 2005

- Location within the East Riding of Yorkshire
- OS grid reference: TA245325
  - London: 155 mi (249 km) S
- Civil parish: Elstronwick
- Unitary authority: East Riding of Yorkshire
- Ceremonial county: East Riding of Yorkshire
- Region: Yorkshire and the Humber
- Country: England
- Sovereign state: United Kingdom
- Post town: HULL
- Postcode district: HU12
- Dialling code: 01964
- Police: Humberside
- Fire: Humberside
- Ambulance: Yorkshire
- UK Parliament: Beverley and Holderness

Danthorpe is a hamlet in the civil parish of Elstronwick and the East Riding of Yorkshire, England, and in an area known as Holderness.

The hamlet is approximately 4 miles (6 km) north-east of the town of Hedon, 1 mile (1.6 km) north of the village of Burton Pidsea, and 14 miles (23 km) south-east from the county town of Beverley. Danthorpe is centred on Southfield Lane, the road running from Burton Pidsea to Humbleton, and just south of its junction with Back Lane running 1 mile west to the parish village of Elstronwick.

Danthorpe was formerly a township in the parish of Humbleton, in 1866 Danthorpe became a civil parish, on 1 April 1935 the parish was abolished and merged with Elstronwick. In 1931 the parish had a population of 52.

The name Danthorpe derives from the Old Norse Danirþorp meaning 'secondary settlement of the Danes'.

Danthorpe is listed in the Domesday Book as 'Danetorp', in the Hundred of Holderness, and was of 5.2 geld units—taxable units assessed by hide area—and contained one ploughland, 3.8 households, and one smallholder. In 1066 the lordship was held by the Canons of Beverley St John, who held thirty-three manors in the east of Yorkshire under the overlordship of Ealdred, Archbishop of York. This lordship was retained by the Beverley canons in 1086, under the following archbishop of York, Thomas of Bayeux, who was also Tenant-in-chief to king William I.

In 1823, Baines recorded that Danthorpe was in the parish of Humbleton, and the wapentake and the liberty of Holderness, and had a population of 56 including a corn miller and three farmers.

At the east of Danthorpe is the farm of the Grade II listed Danthorpe Hall. The hall dates to the late 17th century, with 18th- and 19th-century wing additions, and is built of red brick with pebbledash rendering.

== See also ==
- Listed buildings in Elstronwick
