= Listed buildings in East Garton =

East Garton is a civil parish in the county of the East Riding of Yorkshire, England. It contains eight listed buildings that are recorded in the National Heritage List for England. Of these, two are listed at Grade I, the highest of the three grades, two are at Grade II*, the middle grade, and the others are at Grade II, the lowest grade. The parish contains the village of Garton, the hamlets of Fitling and Grimston, and the surrounding countryside. The listed buildings consist of a church, houses and associated structures, farmhouses and a former windmill.

== Key ==
Grade	Criteria
I	Buildings of exceptional interest, sometimes considered to be internationally important
II*	Particularly important buildings of more than special interest
II	Buildings of national importance and special interest

== Buildings ==
Name and location	Photograph	Date	Notes	Grade
St Michael's Church; 53.79992°N 0.07255°W		Early 13th century	The church has been altered and extended during the centuries, including a restoration in 1887. It is built in cobbles with freestone dressings, and the porch is in brick. The church consists of a nave, a south aisle, a south porch, a chancel and a west tower. The tower, which is unbuttressed, has two stages, a double-chamfered plinth, lancet windows, and lancet bell openings. The porch has a pointed arch on grotesque corbels and a hood mould, and the doorway is round-headed. The east window has three lights and Perpendicular-style tracery.	I
Blue Hall; 53.80132°N 0.08569°W		c. 1700	The house is in orange brick, with a floor band and hipped pantile roofs. There are two storeys and an L-shaped plan, with a front range of five bays. The doorway is in the centre, above it is a cross-mullioned window, and the other windows are casements.	II*
Crawshaw Farmhouse; 53.78490°N 0.09892°W	—	Late 17th to early 18th century	The farmhouse is in red brick, with a dentilled brick eaves cornice, and a pantile roof with a raised coped gable. There are two storeys, a front range of three bays, and a two-bay rear wing. In the centre of the front is a blocked entrance, and the doorway is on the rear wing, with a moulded surround, and a fanlight in moulded reveals. The windows are sashes.	II
Poplar Farmhouse; 53.80011°N 0.07019°W	—	Late 18th century	The farmhouse is in red brick, with a dentilled brick eaves cornice, and a tile roof with tumbled-in brick to the plain close verges. There are two storeys, an L-shaped plan, and a front range of three bays. The central doorway has a fanlight and a wedge lintel, and the windows are sashes under channelled wedge lintels.	II
Grimston Garth; 53.79643°N 0.05386°W		1781–86	The house, designed by John Carr, is in red brick, with rubbed brick dressings and a slate roof. It has a triangular plan, with a round tower at each corner and a hexagonal tower in the centre, and from its rear run two long parallel service ranges, each ending in a round tower. The two front ranges have two storeys and four bays and flanking three-storey turrets, all with embattled parapets. Each range has a floor band, a parapet band, and contains sash windows with hood moulds. The entrance front contains two doorways with trefoils and quatrefoils under pointed brick arches and hood moulds. The central hexagon has three storeys, an embattled parapet, and a pyramidal roof.	I
Stable block, Grimston Garth; 53.79722°N 0.05386°W	—	c. 1781–86	The stable block was designed by John Carr, and is in red brick with a slate roof. There is a courtyard plan with three ranges, closed by walls with gate piers and ball finials. The ranges have a single storey, the main range has a central two-storey tower, and the side ranges end in canted bays. The main range contains three carriage doorways with pointed heads, and the central bay has an embattled parapet, a pyramidal roof and a weathervane. The other ranges have doorways and windows with pointed heads.	II*
Garton Mill; 53.80278°N 0.08645°W		Late 18th to early 19th century	The former tower windmill is in red brick, it is tapering, and has a circular plan. There are three storeys, and it contains a doorway, windows under segmental arches, and has an embattled parapet. The cap and sails are missing.	II
Gatehouse, Grimston Garth; 53.79457°N 0.06362°W		1812	The gatehouse is in grey brick, with stone dressings and a lead roof. It has a rectangular plan with two storeys and octagonal corner turrets, all with false machicolations and embattled parapets, and lower two-storey wings were added later. In the centre is a pointed arch with decorated imposts and clustered columns. Above it is a heraldic shield, and a square-headed window containing three-lights with trefoil heads, and a hood mould. The turrets have four stages divided by string courses, and contain lancet windows with hood moulds, and arrow loops.	II
