= Fitling =

Hamlet in the East Riding of Yorkshire, England

Coordinates: 53.786725°N 0.100824°W

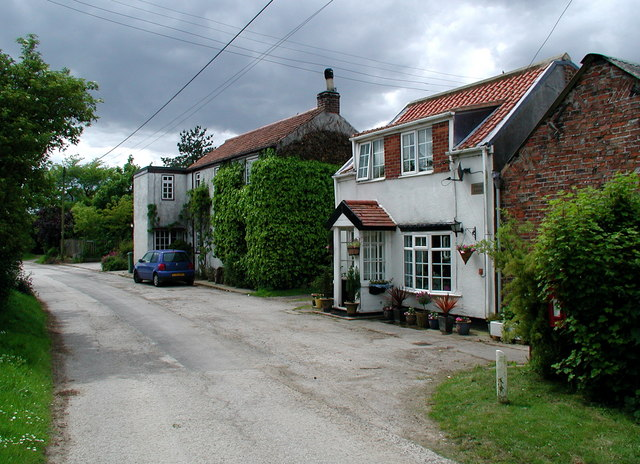
- Fitling Lane

- Location within the East Riding of Yorkshire
- OS grid reference: TA252339
  - London: 155 mi (249 km) S
- Civil parish: East Garton
- Unitary authority: East Riding of Yorkshire
- Ceremonial county: East Riding of Yorkshire
- Region: Yorkshire and the Humber
- Country: England
- Sovereign state: United Kingdom
- Post town: HULL
- Postcode district: HU12
- Dialling code: 01964
- Police: Humberside
- Fire: Humberside
- Ambulance: Yorkshire
- UK Parliament: Beverley and Holderness

Fitling is a hamlet in the civil parish of East Garton, in the East Riding of Yorkshire, England, in an area known as Holderness. It is situated approximately 7 miles (11 km) north-west of Withernsea town centre. It lies 1 mile (1.6 km) west of the B1242 road.

Fitling was formerly a township in the parish of Humbleton, in 1866 Fitling became a civil parish, on 1 April 1935 the parish was abolished to form East Garton. In 1931 the parish had a population of 85.

The name Fitling derives from the Old English Fitelaingas meaning 'the people of Fitela'.

In 1823 parish inhabitants numbered 119. Occupations included ten farmers and a shoemaker.

== See also ==
- Listed buildings in East Garton
