= St Lawrence's Church, Elstronwick =

Church in Elstronwick, East Riding of Yorkshire, England

Coordinates: 53°46′20″N 0°07′37″W

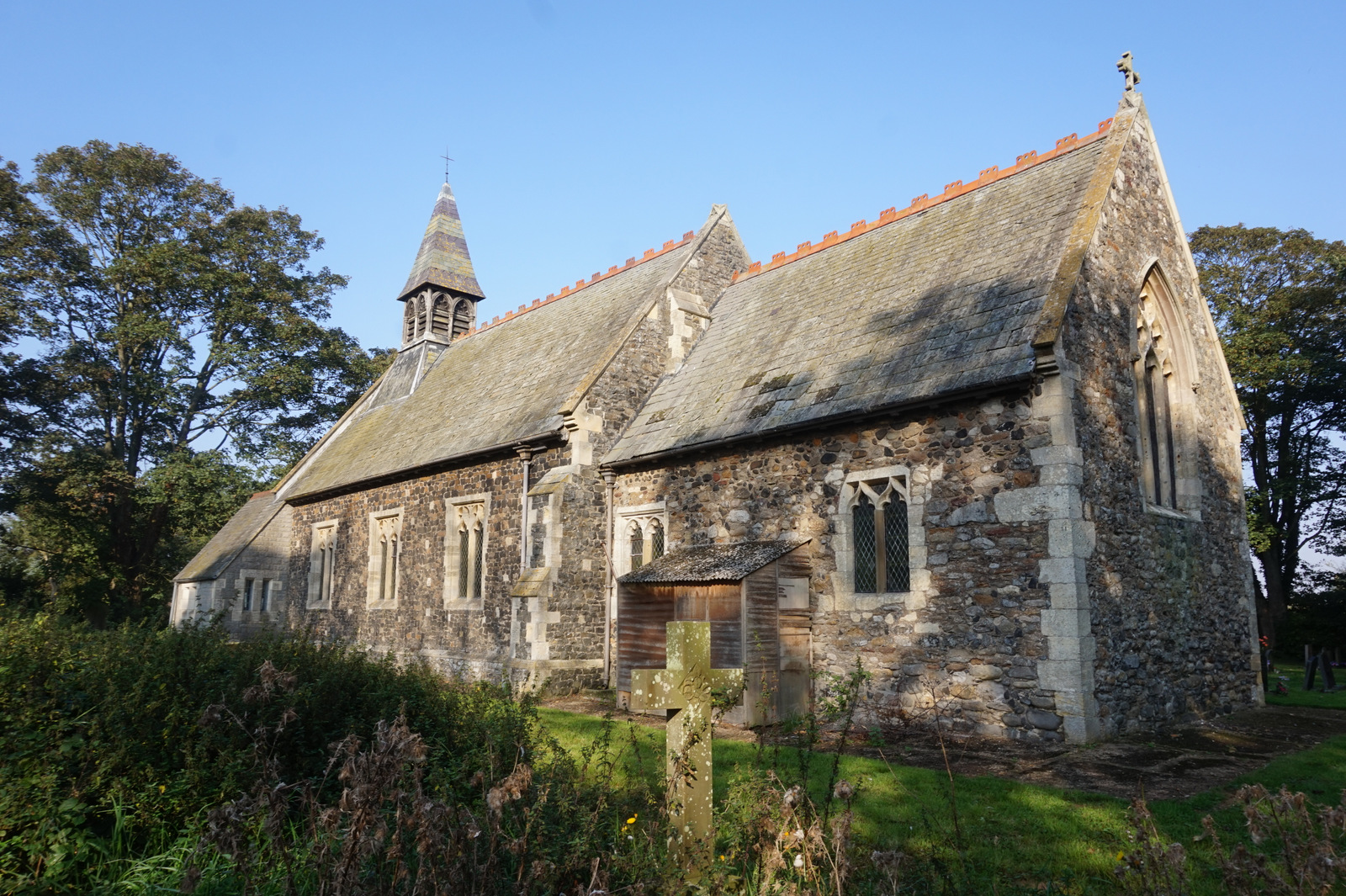
The church, in 2020

St Lawrence's Church is the parish church of Elstronwick, a village in the East Riding of Yorkshire, in England.

Elstronwick was long in the parish of St Peter's Church, Humbleton. There was a chapel of ease in the village by the early 14th century, from which some windows survive. The church was rebuilt in the early 16th century. In 1848, it was described as "a small edifice, with a bell-turret at the west end... entered by a large doorway in the Grecian style, brought from Humbleton Hall when the chapel was repaired". The chapel was largely rebuilt in 1875 and was grade II listed in 1987.

The church is built of stone with freestone dressings and a slate roof. It consists of a nave and a chancel, and on the west gable is a timber bellcote with a broach spire and an ornamental slate roof. The east and west windows have stained glass installed in 1875, while inside there are several damaged 19th-century wall monuments.

== See also ==
- Listed buildings in Elstronwick
