= New Mills (disambiguation) =

New Mills is a town in Derbyshire, England.

New Mills may also refer to:

== In the Derbyshire town ==
- New Mills A.F.C.
- New Mills School

== Elsewhere ==
- New Mills, Cornwall, England
- New Mills, New Brunswick, Canada, near Heron Island

== See also ==
- New Mill (disambiguation)
- Newmills, County Tyrone, Northern Ireland
- Newmills F.C., a football club in County Tyrone, Northern Ireland
- Newmill, Moray, Scotland
