= Listed buildings in Humbleton =

Humbleton is a civil parish in the county of the East Riding of Yorkshire, England. It contains seven listed buildings that are recorded in the National Heritage List for England. Of these, one is listed at Grade I, the highest of the three grades, and the others are at Grade II, the lowest grade. The parish contains the villages of Humbleton and Flinton, and the surrounding countryside. The listed buildings consist of houses and associated structures, a church and a vicarage.

== Key ==
Grade	Criteria
I	Buildings of exceptional interest, sometimes considered to be internationally important
II	Buildings of national importance and special interest

== Buildings ==
Name and location	Photograph	Date	Notes	Grade
St Peter's Church; 53.79560°N 0.13972°W		13th century	The church has been altered and extended through the centuries, including restorations in 1888–89 by J. L. Pearson and in 1906 by John Bilson. It is built in cobbles and stone, with the chancel in brick, and has a slate roof. The church consists of a nave with a clerestory, north and south aisles, a chancel, and a west tower embraced by the aisles. The tower has three stages, diagonal buttresses, moulded string courses, a three-light pointed west window with a hood mould, slit windows on the middle stage, clock faces, bell openings with Y-tracery, and an embattled parapet.	I
Carr Farmhouse; 53.80774°N 0.14892°W		Mid-18th century	The house is in red brick, and has a pantile roof with tumbled-in brick on the raised gables. There are two storeys and attics, a parallel rear range, and four bays. The doorway is under a flat gauged brick arch, and the windows are sashes under flat brick arches. On the attics are boarded taking-in doors.	II
Fairfield Farmhouse; 53.80792°N 0.14787°W	—	Mid-18th century	The house is in brown brick, and has a pantile roof, hipped on the right. There are two storeys and three bays. The central doorway has a flat brick arch, and the windows are sashes under cambered brick arches.	II
Manor House; 53.80621°N 0.15151°W	—	Late 18th century	The house is in orange brick, and has a slate roof with raised coped gables. There are two storeys and four bays. On the front is a porch flanked by sash windows, to the extreme right are French windows, and on the upper floor are sash windows, all under cambered wedge lintels. At the rear is a porch with a dentilled segmental pediment on console brackets, and a doorway with a fanlight.	II
Humbleton Hall and walls 53.79591°N 0.12952°W		c. 1815	The house is in red brick, colourwashed on the front, with a hipped slate roof. There are two storeys and five bays, the outer two bays on each side full-height bow windows. In the centre is a Tuscan porch, and the windows are sashes under wedge lintels. The house is flanked by quadrant walls with ramped coped parapets, containing boarded doors with radial fanlights.	II
Ivy Cottage; 53.79518°N 0.13989°W		1830	Originally a school and a schoolhouse, it is in brown brick with hipped slate roofs. The house has two storeys and two bays. The doorway has a fanlight, and the windows are sashes under wedge lintels. The former school to the left has one storey and three bays, and contains thee round-headed sash windows under brick arches.	II
The Vicarage; 53.79432°N 0.13939°W	—	c. 1840	The vicarage is in grey brick, with oversailing eaves and a slate roof. There are two storeys and three bays, the outer bays projecting under gables with ornamental bargeboards. The central doorway has pilasters, a panelled soffit and reveals, and a fanlight with radial glazing. This is flanked by canted bay windows with hood moulds, and on the upper floor are two-light windows with hood moulds.	II
