= Grimston Garth =

Building in the East Riding of Yorkshire, England

Coordinates: 53°47′47″N 0°03′14″W

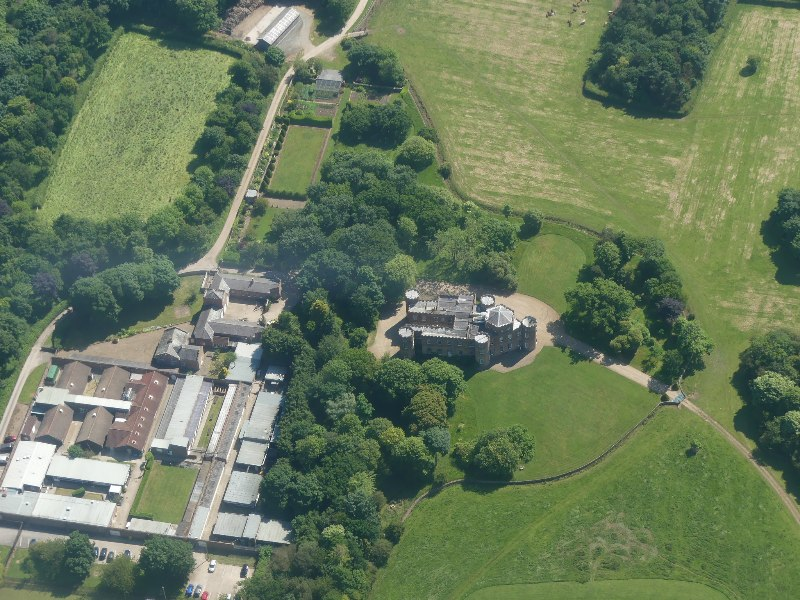
The building, in 2021

Grimston Garth is a historic building in Grimston, East Riding of Yorkshire, a hamlet in England.

== History ==
The house was constructed between 1781 and 1786, for Thomas Grimston, as a replacement for the former manor house. It was designed by John Carr, in the Gothic revival style. Service ranges were added around 1815, and there were some further additions including a tower around 1860, which were designed by W. D. Keyworth. The house was not regularly occupied in the late 19th century, but was restored around 1920. The house descended through the Grimston family until 1948, when it was purchased by the St Andrew's Steam Fishing Company. It passed through various before being purchased by Reckitt and Sons in 1964, then in 1972 by Oliver Marriott. Marriott again restored the building, in the process removing much of Keyworth's work. The house has been grade I listed since 1966.

The grounds were laid out to a design by Thomas White; largely parkland, with a walled kitchen garden. The kitchen garden has been built over with scientific laboratories, but the remainder has have survived largely intact. They include plantations around the edge, with a gap providing the house with sea views. They are a rare example of coastal woodlands on the Holderness coast.

== Architecture ==
=== House ===
The house is built of red brick, with rubbed brick dressings and a slate roof. It has a triangular plan, with a round tower at each corner and a hexagonal tower in the centre, and from its rear run two long parallel service ranges, each ending in a round tower. The two front ranges have two storeys and four bays and flanking three-storey turrets, all with embattled parapets. Each range has a floor band, a parapet band, and contains sash windows with hood moulds. The entrance front contains two doorways with trefoils and quatrefoils under pointed brick arches and hood moulds. The central hexagon has three storeys, an embattled parapet, and a pyramidal roof. Inside, both the dining and drawing rooms are hexagonal. On the ground floor, much of the original plasterwork and woodwork survives, and the north turret of the east range has an unusual bed which folds into a cupboard.

=== Stables ===
The stable block is grade II* listed, is contemporary with the house, and was also designed by Carr. It is built of red brick with a slate roof. There is a courtyard plan with three ranges, closed by walls with gate piers and ball finials. The ranges have a single storey, the main range has a central two-storey tower, and the side ranges end in canted bays. The main range contains three carriage doorways with pointed heads, and the central bay has an embattled parapet, a pyramidal roof and a weathervane. The other ranges have doorways and windows with pointed heads.

=== Gatehouse ===
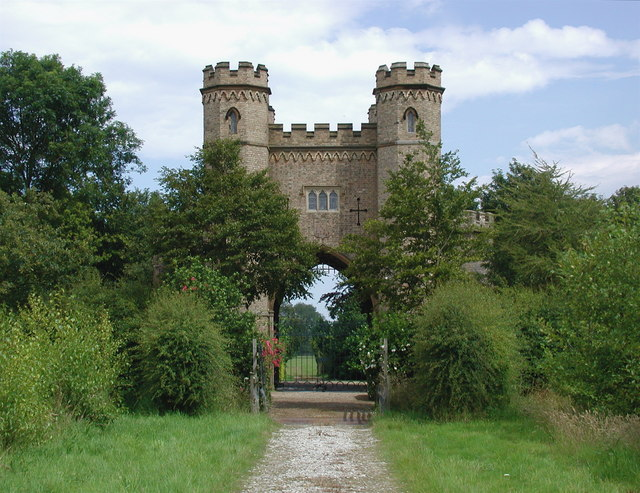
Grimston Lodge

The grade II-listed gatehouse, also known as Grimston Lodge, was built in 1812, perhaps to a design by John Earle. It is constructed of grey brick, with stone dressings and a lead roof. It has a rectangular plan with two storeys and octagonal corner turrets, all with false machicolations and embattled parapets, and lower two-storey wings were added later. In the centre is a pointed arch with decorated imposts and clustered columns. Above it is a heraldic shield, and a square-headed window containing three-lights with trefoil heads, and a hood mould. The turrets have four stages divided by string courses, and contain lancet windows with hood moulds, and arrow loops.

== See also ==
- Grade I listed buildings in the East Riding of Yorkshire
- Listed buildings in East Garton
