= Blue Mill, Garton =

Mill in the East Riding of Yorkshire, England

Coordinates: 53°48′10″N 0°05′11″W

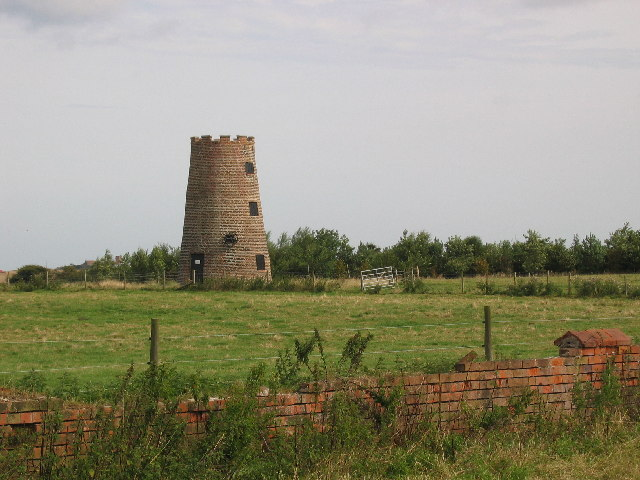
The building, in 2005

Blue Mill, also known as Garton Mill, is a historic building in Garton, a village in the East Riding of Yorkshire, England.

The tower windmill was probably constructed in the mid 1820s. It became known as "Blue Mill" after nearby Blue Hall. The mill only operated until around 1880, but survives as a ruin with no windows. The structure was grade II listed in 1987.

The windmill is built of red brick, it is tapering, and has a circular plan. There are three storeys, and it contains a doorway, windows under segmental arches, and has an embattled parapet. The cap and sails are missing.

== See also ==
- Listed buildings in East Garton
