= Listed buildings in Burton Pidsea =

Burton Pidsea is a civil parish in the county of the East Riding of Yorkshire, England. It contains 14 listed buildings that are recorded in the National Heritage List for England. Of these, one is listed at Grade I, the highest of the three grades, and the others are at Grade II, the lowest grade. The parish contains the village of Burton Pidsea and the surrounding countryside. Most of the listed buildings are houses, cottages and associated structures, farmhouses and farm buildings, and the others are a church, a public house and a former windmill.

== Key ==
Grade	Criteria
I	Buildings of exceptional interest, sometimes considered to be internationally important
II	Buildings of national importance and special interest

== Buildings ==
Name and location	Photograph	Date	Notes	Grade
St Peter and St Paul's Church; 53.76128°N 0.10242°W		Early 13th century	The church has been altered and extended through the centuries, including a restoration in 1866–68. It is built in cobble with stone dressings and a slate roof, and consists of a nave with a clerestory, north and south aisles, a south porch, a chancel with a south chapel and a north vestry, and a west tower embraced by the aisles. The tower has three stages, a moulded plinth, diagonal buttresses, chamfered string courses, a pointed three-light west window, pointed two-light bell openings, and an embattled parapet. Along the aisles are pinnacled buttresses.	I
House southwest of Graysgarth House; 53.76143°N 0.11345°W	—	Early to mid-18th century	The house is in orange brick, and has a pantile roof with tumbled-in brickwork to raised gables. There is a single storey, four bays, and a rear outshut under a catslide roof. On the front is a doorway, and horizontally siding sash windows under segmental brick arches.	II
Manor Farmhouse; 53.75662°N 0.09818°W		Early to mid-18th century	The farmhouse is in orange and brown brick, and has a pantile roof with raised gables. There are two storeys and three bays. The central doorway has a divided fanlight, the windows are sashes, and all the openings are under segmental brick arches.	II
The Chestnuts; 53.76201°N 0.10712°W	—	Early to mid-18th century	The house is in colourwashed and rendered brick on a plinth, with rusticated quoins, a floor band, a dentilled and bracketed timber eaves cornice, and a hipped slate roof. There are two storeys and attics, and three bays. In the centre is a porch with fluted columns and pilasters with foliate capitals, and an entablature, and a doorway with panelled reveals and soffit, and a fanlight. The windows are sashes with architraves.	II
Cross Keys Cottage; 53.76094°N 0.10280°W	—	Late 18th century	Three cottages, later combined into one dwelling, in red brick, with stepped brick eaves cornices, and pantile roofs with tumbled-in brickwork on the gable ends. The middle house has two storeys and attics and two bays, and contains a central doorway flanked by sash windows, all under segmental arches, and there are two gabled dormers. The right cottage has one storey and two bays, and contains a doorway and sash windows. The left cottage has one storey and attics and one bay, and a continuous rear outshut, and has a doorway and a sash window.	II
Pigeon house, Manor House; 53.75649°N 0.09743°W	—	Late 18th century	The pigeon house is in red brick, with a pyramidal pantile roof. There are two storeys, and the upper floor contains a round-headed window under a brick arch. On the roof is a louvre and a weathervane.	II
The Nancy Public House; 53.76160°N 0.10247°W		Late 18th century	The public house, which incorporates an earlier house, is in colourwashed red brick with a pantile roof, and it is in two blocks. The left block has two storeys and three bays. It has a stepped brick cornice, tumbled-in brick to the raised gables, and contains sash windows. The right block has a single storey and attics, and four bays. It contains two doorways, varied windows, and four gabled roof dormers.	II
Graysgarth House; 53.76193°N 0.11189°W	—	Early 19th century	The house is light brown brick on a plinth, with stone dressings, a floor band, oversailing eaves on paired brackets, and a hipped slate roof. There are two storeys and fronts of three bays. In the centre of the entrance front is a porch with paired Tuscan columns with an entablature, flanked by full-height bow windows. The windows are sashes with cambered channelled wedge lintels and decorated keystones. Flanking the middle window on the top floor are stone heraldic shields.	II
Windmill; 53.75937°N 0.11459°W		1834	The former tower windmill is in red brick, and has a stepped cornice and a pyramidal roof with a finial. There are five storeys and a circular plan. On the ground floor is a French door, and above are casement windows under segmental brick arches.	II
Chatt House; 53.76033°N 0.10119°W	—	1839	The house is in grey brick, with stone dressings, a floor band, oversailing eaves and a hipped slate roof. There are two storeys and fronts of three bays. The outer bays on the main front project slightly, and in the centre is a semicircular porch with Doric pilasters, an entablature, and a blocking course surmounted by a railing. The windows are sashes with channelled cambered wedge lintels and decorated keystones.	II
Pigeon house, Chatt House; 53.76001°N 0.10013°W	—	1839–40	The pigeon house is in brown brick, with grey brick dressings, a floor band and a pyramidal slate roof. There are two storeys and a square plan. It has a doorway with a cambered gauged brick arch, the upper floor contains windows under round gauged brick arches, and on the roof is a louvre with pigeonholes, and a weathervane.	II
Stable block, Chatt House; 53.76031°N 0.10085°W	—	1839–40	The stable block to the east of the house is in grey brick with a slate roof. There are two storeys and attics, and an L-shaped plan, with a main range of nine bays, and a cross-wing with three bays. In the centre of the main range is a carriage entrance containing doors with a radial fanlight under a segmental brick arch, and elsewhere are sash windows and board doors.	II
Bramhill House; 53.76096°N 0.11534°W	—	1843	The house is in white brick on a stone plinth, with a sill band, dentilled wooden eaves and a hipped slate roof. There are two storeys and three bays, the middle bay projecting slightly. In the centre is a porch with square columns and a moulded flat hood, and a doorway with a large fanlight. The windows are sashes with rusticated lintels.	II
Boundary wall, The Paddocks; 53.76296°N 0.10891°W		1843	The garden wall, which extends along New Road and Main Street, is in stone and red brick, with tile copings. It runs for a total of about 350 yards (320 m), it is curved on the corner, and varies in height between 4 feet (1.2 m) and 9 feet (2.7 m). At the north end is a segmental-headed doorway with brick gate piers. The date and initials of the builder are inserted in white stones about halfway along the wall.	II
