= Listed buildings in Etton, East Riding of Yorkshire =

Etton is a civil parish in the county of the East Riding of Yorkshire, England. It contains 17 listed buildings that are recorded in the National Heritage List for England. Of these, one is listed at Grade II*, the middle of the three grades, and the others are at Grade II, the lowest grade. The parish contains the village of Etton and the surrounding countryside. Most of the listed buildings are houses and associated structures, and the others include a church, fragments of a wayside cross, a former windmill, a war memorial and a telephone kiosk.

== Key ==
Grade	Criteria
II*	Particularly important buildings of more than special interest
II	Buildings of national importance and special interest

== Buildings ==
Name and location	Photograph	Date	Notes	Grade
St Mary's Church; 53.87915°N 0.50861°W		12th century	The oldest part of the church is the tower, and the rest of the church was largely rebuilt in stages during the 19th and early 20th century. It is built in stone with slate roofs, and consists of a nave, a south aisle, a south porch, a chancel with a north vestry and a south chapel, and a west tower. The tower has two stages, clasping pilaster buttresses, a round-headed slit window, two-light round-headed bell openings, and a corbelled out parapet. On the west is a Norman doorway with a round arch, and three orders of nook shafts and scallop capitals, and a hood mould.	II*
Wayside cross 53.88368°N 0.58535°W		Medieval	The cross is in magnesium limestone, and consists of four sections on two sides of a driveway. The cross base is just over 1 metre (3 ft 3 in) square, and has a chamfered top. The other sections consist of two fragments of the shaft, and a square shallow pyramidal capstone.	II
St Mary's House; 53.87945°N 0.50763°W	—	16th century or earlier	Originally a rectory and later extended and altered, it is in red brick with a pantile roof, an irregular L-shaped plan and two storeys. The earlier part has two bays and contains a canted bay window, and sash windows under gauged brick arches, some cambered. There are two massive chimney stacks incorporating medieval brick. The roof is hipped on the right, and has a coped gable on the left. The later range has four bays, and contains a square bay window and sash windows.	II
Low Hall; 53.87778°N 0.50751°W	—	Late 17th century	The surviving service wing of a demolished large house, and a later extension, in colourwashed brick, with pantile roofs. The earlier part has two storeys and five bays, a stepped eaves cornice, and raised coped gables. The doorway has an eared architrave, a pulvinated frieze and a pediment, and the windows are sashes. The extension has three storeys and two bays, and a pyramidal roof. On the front are blocked openings under segmental heads, and at the rear are sash windows, those on the top floor horizontally sliding, all under flat gauged brick arches.	II
Former stable block, Low Hall; 53.87810°N 0.50707°W	—	Late 17th century	The former stable building is in red brick, with stone dressings, and a pantile roof with raised coped gables. There is a single storey and lofts, and 14 bays. In the centre is a blocked carriage entrance, flanked by doors with fanlights, all under segmental brick arches, and there are cross-mullioned windows under flat gauged brick arches. Above, there are roof dormers with taking-in doors.	II
Screen walls, gate piers and pavilions, Low Hall; 53.87789°N 0.50729°W	—	Late 17th century	The walls are in brick with chamfered stone coping, and are about 10 feet (3.0 m) in height. In the centre are limestone gate piers with moulded plinths, panelled sides, moulded capitals and bases to missing finials, and outside these are semicircular niches with moulded sills. At the ends of the walls are pavilions with a single storey and a single bay. Each pavilion contains a window, and has an eaves band, a parapet, and a corner pilaster.	II
69 Main Street; 53.87808°N 0.51403°W	—	Mid-18th century	The house is in painted brick, with a stepped eaves cornice, and a pantile roof with tumbled-in brick to the raised gables. There are two storeys and four bays. On the front is a doorway, and the windows are horizontally sliding sashes. The ground floor openings are under segmental brick arches, and the upper floor windows are tripartite.	II
68 Main Street; 53.87815°N 0.51490°W	—	Late 18th century	The house is in red brick, with a stepped eaves cornice, and a pantile roof with raised gables. There are two storeys and three bays. Steps lead up to the central doorway that has a fanlight, and the windows are casements under cambered gauged brick arches.	II
81 Main Street; 53.87795°N 0.51509°W	—	Late 18th century	The house is in yellow-brown brick, with a stepped eaves cornice, and a pantile roof with tumbled-in brick to the raised gables. There are two storeys and two bays. The central doorway has a fanlight, the windows are sashes, and the ground floor openings are under segmental brick arches.	II
83 Main Street; 53.87792°N 0.51534°W	—	Late 18th century	The house is in red brick, with a dentilled eaves cornice, and a pantile roof with tumbled-in brick to the raised gables. There are two storeys, two bays, and a single-storey single-bay extension on the left. The doorway has a fanlight, the windows are sashes, and the ground floor openings are under cambered gauged brick arches.	II
Church Farmhouse; 53.87904°N 0.50973°W		Late 18th century	The farmhouse is in brick, and has a pantile roof with tumbled-in brick to the raised gables. There are two storeys and four bays. On the front is a projecting gabled porch and a doorway with a fanlight. Above the doorway is a blank panel, and the windows are sashes, all under slightly cambered gauged brick aches.	II
Etton Mill; 53.87282°N 0.50951°W		c. 1790	The disused tower windmill is in red brick, it has a circular plan, and is tapering, with a height of 35 feet (11 m). There are four storeys, on the ground floor is a doorway, above is a loading door, and the two top floors contain segmental-headed openings.	II
Snilesworth Cottage; 53.87782°N 0.51603°W	—	Late 18th to early 19th century	A pair of houses in brown brick, with a stepped brick eaves cornice, and a tile roof with tumbled-in brick to the raised gables. There are two storeys and four bays. Each house has a central doorway, and the windows are sashes. The ground floor openings have cambered wedge lintels.	II
57 Main Street; 53.87820°N 0.51284°W	—	Early 19th century	The house is in variegated red and brown brick, with a dentilled brick eaves cornice, and a pantile roof with tumbled-in brick to the raised gables. There are two storeys and three bays. The central doorway has a fanlight, above it is a blank opening, the windows are sashes, and all the openings have cambered brick gauged arches.	II
Cherry Corner; 53.87830°N 0.51109°W	—	Early 19th century	The house is in orange brick, and has a pantile roof with tumbled-in brick to the raised gables on brick kneelers. There are two storeys and three bays. The central doorway has pilasters, a fanlight, and a slightly projecting hood on moulded brackets. The windows are sashes under slightly cambered brick gauged arches.	II
War memorial 53.87832°N 0.51162°W		1922	The war memorial stands in a garden by a crossroads. It is in Portland stone, it consists of a crucifix, and is 4 metres (13 ft) in height. The crucifix stands on two steps and a concrete platform. On the plinth are inscriptions, the names of those lost in the two World Wars, and the names of those who served in the First World War.	II
Telephone kiosk 53.87837°N 0.51178°W		1935	The telephone kiosk in Main Street is of the K6 type designed by Giles Gilbert Scott. Constructed in cast iron with a square plan and a dome, it has three unperforated crowns in the top panels.	II
