= St Mary's Church, Etton =

Church in Etton, East Riding of Yorkshire, England

Coordinates: 53°52′45″N 0°30′31″W

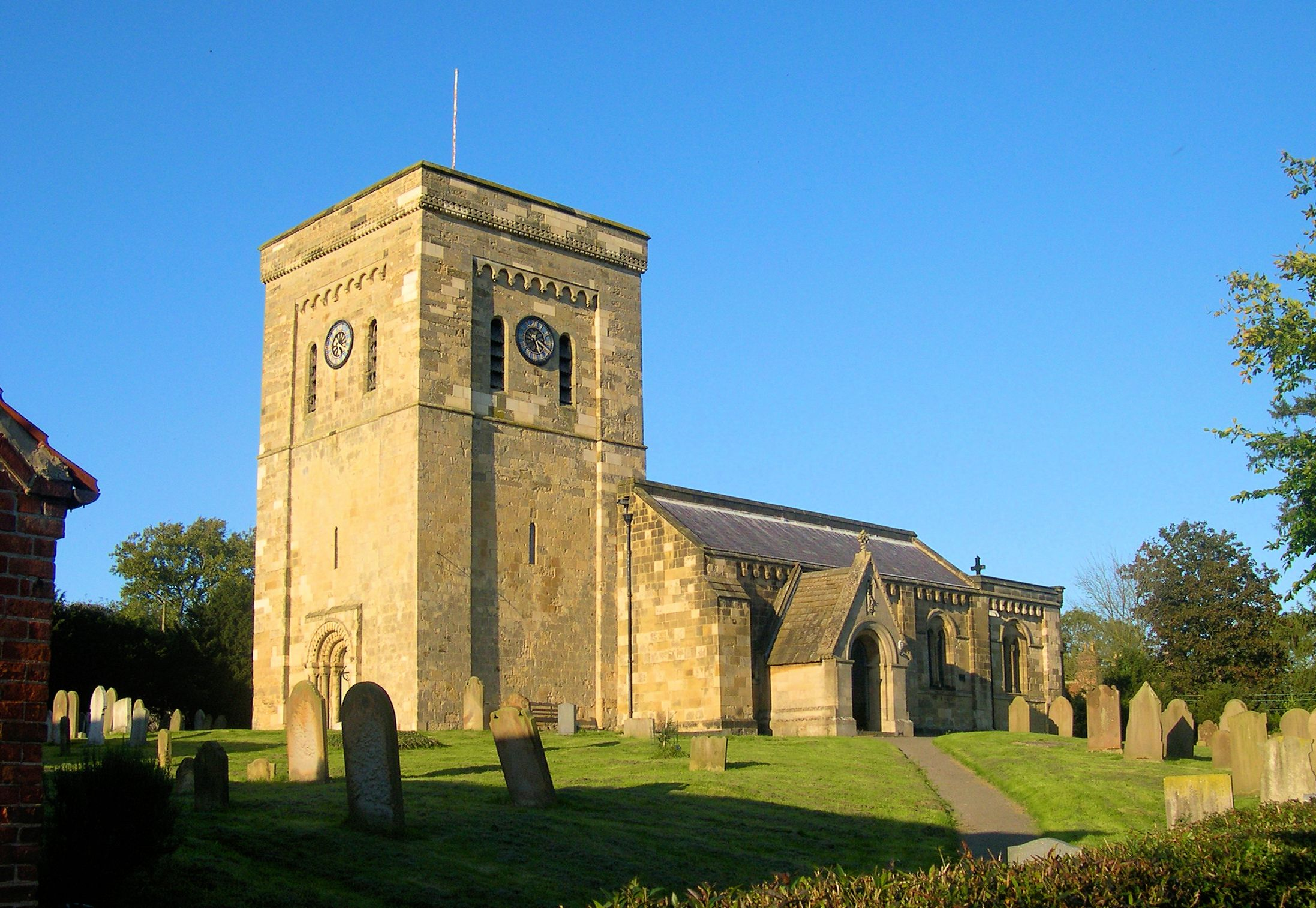
The church, in 2005

St Mary's Church is the parish church of Etton, East Riding of Yorkshire, a village in England.

The oldest part of the church is the lower part of the tower, dating from the 12th century. A south aisle was added to the church in around 1300, while the remainder of the church was rebuilt between 1844 and 1845 by Robert Dennis Chantrell in the Romanesque style. The south aisle was partly rebuilt in 1866 and 1867, and the church was restored in 1891, the work including the addition of a porch and vestry. The church was grade II* listed in 1968.

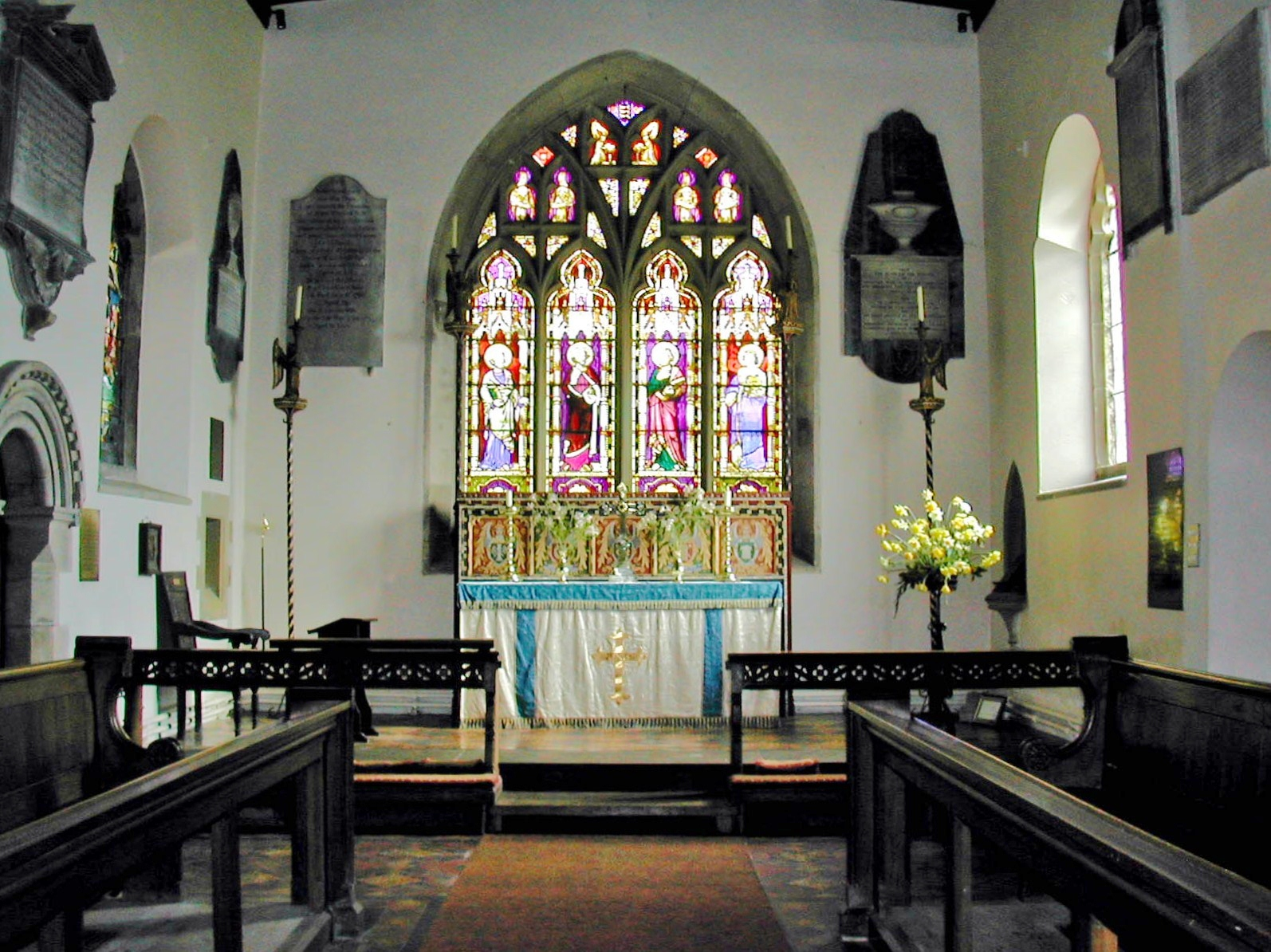
Interior of the chancel

The church is built of stone with slate roofs, and consists of a nave, a south aisle, a south porch, a chancel with a north vestry and a south chapel, and a west tower. The tower has two stages, clasping pilaster buttresses, a round-headed slit window, two-light round-headed bell openings, and a corbelled out parapet. On the west is a Norman doorway with a round arch, and three orders of nook shafts and scallop capitals, and a hood mould. Inside, there are a variety of monuments, and three sculptures carved around 1190 and moved from St Peter's Church, Holme-on-the-Wolds, depicting Christ confronting a demon, Saint Paul and Saint Peter.

== See also ==
- Grade II* listed buildings in the East Riding of Yorkshire
- Listed buildings in Etton, East Riding of Yorkshire
