= Keyingham Old Mill =

Windmill in Keyingham, East Riding of Yorkshire, England

Coordinates: 53°42′43″N 0°07′00″W

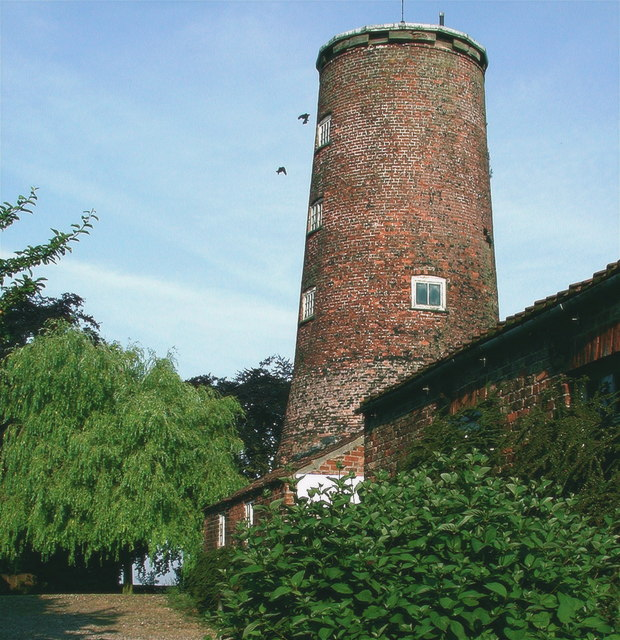
The building, in 2006

Keyingham Old Mill is a historic building in Keyingham, a village in the East Riding of Yorkshire, in England.

The windmill was constructed in the late 18th century as a corn mill. In 1813, it was advertised for sale with three pairs of millstones and a newly built house. In about 1825, it was heightened and its equipment replaced. It was converted to steam power in 1910, and the sails were removed soon afterwards. The mill closed in 1941, and despite remaining disused, the roof was replaced around 1970. The building was grade II listed in 1987. The Mills Archive Trust describes it as "the most complete example of an East Yorkshire windmill". In 2025, plans were submitted to convert the mill into a house.

The former tower windmill is built of brick with traces of tarring. It consists of a circular tapering tower with eight storeys. On the ground floor are two segmental-arched entrances, and above are doorways, and windows, mostly casements, and one horizontally sliding sash window. On the top is a low octagonal roof and a weathervane. Inside, the floors and machinery survive intact.

== See also ==
- Listed buildings in Keyingham
