= St Michael's Church, Garton =

Church in the East Riding of Yorkshire, England

Coordinates: 53°48′00″N 0°04′21″W

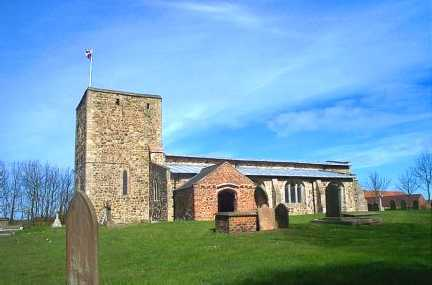
The church, in 2004

St Michael's Church is the parish church of Garton, a village in the East Riding of Yorkshire, in England.

A church in Garton was recorded in the Domesday Book. The oldest part of the current building is the north wall, which is 12th century. The tower was constructed in the early 13th century, followed later in the century by the chancel. The south aisle and south chapel were built in the 14th century, and the porch in the 15th century. The church was recorded as being in poor repair in 1578, following which it was restored and the windows replaced. The building was again restored in the late 17th century, while in 1820 a mausoleum was built on the north side of the church, and around 1840 two windows were added to the south side of the nave. Around 1850, the mausoleum was demolished and the new windows blocked up, then in 1887 the whole building was restored by Smith & Brodrick. In 1929, the roofs were replaced and a further window was created in the nave. The building was grade I listed in 1966.

The church is built of cobbles with freestone dressings, and the porch is in brick. The church consists of a nave, a south aisle, a south porch, a chancel and a west tower. The tower, which is unbuttressed, has two stages, a double-chamfered plinth, lancet windows, and lancet bell openings. The porch has a pointed arch on grotesque corbels and a hood mould, and the doorway is round-headed. The east window has three lights and Perpendicular-style tracery. Inside, there is a late mediaeval screen and an octagonal mid-13th century font.

== See also ==
- Grade I listed buildings in the East Riding of Yorkshire
- Listed buildings in East Garton
