= Burton Pidsea Windmill =

Listed building in the East Riding of Yorkshire, England

Coordinates: 53.7593°N 0.1145°W

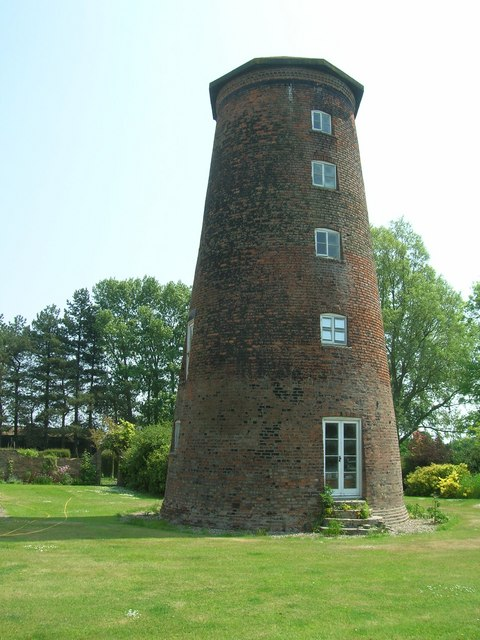
- The building in 2010

- Location within East Riding of Yorkshire

General information
- Status: Converted to residential
- Location: Greens Lane, Burton Pidsea, East Riding of Yorkshire, England
- Year built: Late 18th to early 19th century

Listed Building – Grade II
- Official name: Windmill
- Designated: 6 July 1987
- Reference no.: 1083495

Burton Pidsea Windmill is a historic building on Greens Lane in Burton Pidsea, a village in the East Riding of Yorkshire, England.

A windmill in Burton Pidsea was first recorded in the 1260s. It was demolished in the early 19th century, and a replacement was built on a new site, in 1834, by George and William Boyd. It was operated for many years by the Stephenson family, who purchased the freehold in 1917. Steam power was introduced in 1889 but milling ended around 1901. The building was then used to retail flour which had been milled in Kingston upon Hull. It was disused from the 1940s, and was used as a play space in the 1960s and then as a barn. In the 1980s, it was converted into a house, while in 2023 there was an application to convert it into a holiday let, replace the windows, and change a ladder on the upper floors to a staircase.

The former windmill has been Grade II listed since 1987. It is built of red brick, and has a stepped cornice and a pyramidal roof with a finial. It has five storeys and a circular plan. On the ground floor is a French door, and above are casement windows under segmental brick arches.

== See also ==
- Listed buildings in Burton Pidsea
