= St Nicholas' Church, Keyingham =

Church in Keyingham, East Riding of Yorkshire, England

Coordinates: 53°42′40″N 0°06′54″W

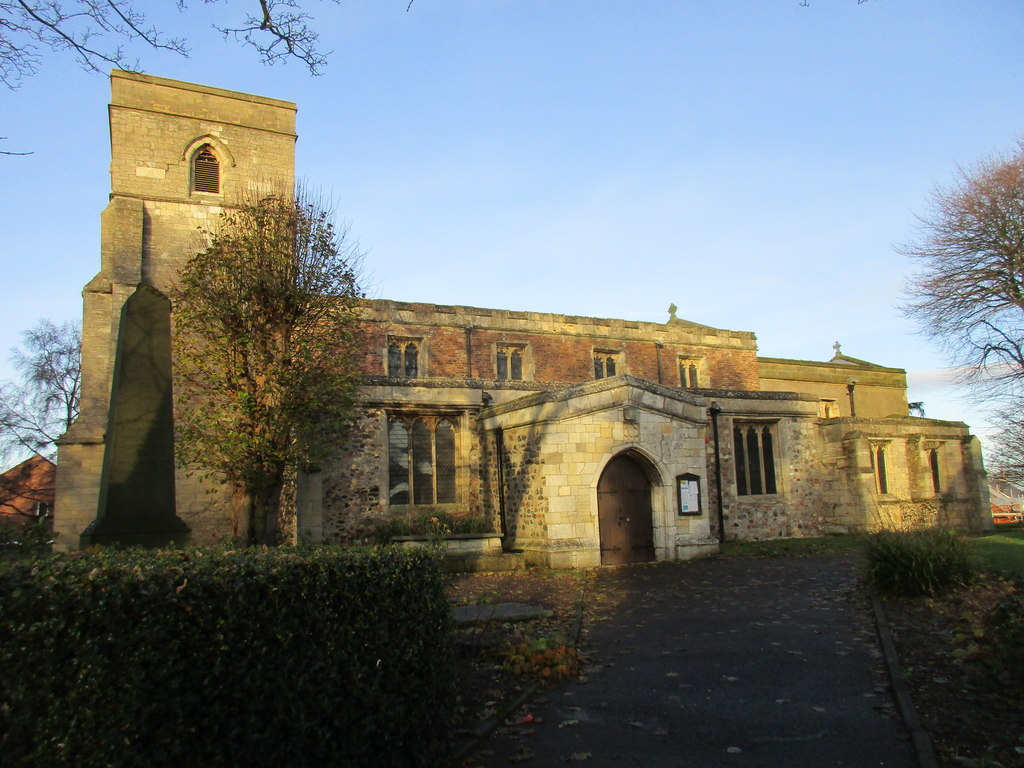
The church, in 2017

St Nicholas' Church is the parish church of Keyingham, a village in the East Riding of Yorkshire, in England.

The church was built around 1200, from which period the nave survives. The chancel, tower and nave arcades were constructed in the late 13th century. A chapel was added in the 14th century, followed in the 15th century by a porch and a clerestory. The chancel was restored in 1885, then between 1888 and 1893 the building was generally restored by Frederick Stead Brodrick, his work including a new roof. The north aisle was rebuilt in 1914, and in 1969 the church spire was removed and the parapet was rebuilt. The building has been grade I listed since 1966.

The church is built of cobbles, limestone and brick, it is partly pebbledashed, and has lead roofs. The church consists of a nave with a clerestory, north and south aisles, a south porch, a chancel with a south chapel, and a west tower. The tower has four stages, a plinth, buttresses, moulded string courses, a small blocked north door, a pointed west window with a hood mould, pointed bell openings with hood moulds, and a coped parapet. Inside, the chancel has a trefoil piscina, there is a 13th-century font, 15th-century wooden roof corbels carved with faces and other decorations, now in the south aisle, and a wrought iron hourglass stand dating from around 1600. There are several memorials, including two to John Angell, who died in 1647.

== See also ==
- Grade I listed buildings in the East Riding of Yorkshire
- Listed buildings in Keyingham
