= East Garton =

Civil parish in the East Riding of Yorkshire, England

Coordinates: 53°47′50″N 0°05′00″W

- Civil parish
- Population: 199 (2011 census)
- OS grid reference: TA262351
- Civil parish: East Garton
- Unitary authority: East Riding of Yorkshire
- Ceremonial county: East Riding of Yorkshire
- Region: Yorkshire and the Humber
- Country: England
- Sovereign state: United Kingdom
- Post town: HULL
- Postcode district: HU11
- Post town: HULL
- Postcode district: HU12
- Dialling code: 01964
- Police: Humberside
- Fire: Humberside
- Ambulance: Yorkshire
- UK Parliament: Beverley and Holderness

East Garton is a civil parish in the East Riding of Yorkshire, England. It is situated 7 miles (11 km) to the north-west of Withernsea town centre and covering an area of 1,346.121 hectares (3,326.34 acres).

The civil parish is formed by the village of Garton and the hamlets of Fitling and Grimston.

According to the 2011 UK census, East Garton parish had a population of 199, a decrease on the 2001 UK census figure of 219.

== See also ==
- Listed buildings in East Garton
