= St Peter and St Paul's Church, Burton Pidsea =

Anglican church in the East Riding of Yorkshire, England

Coordinates: 53.7612°N 0.1023°W

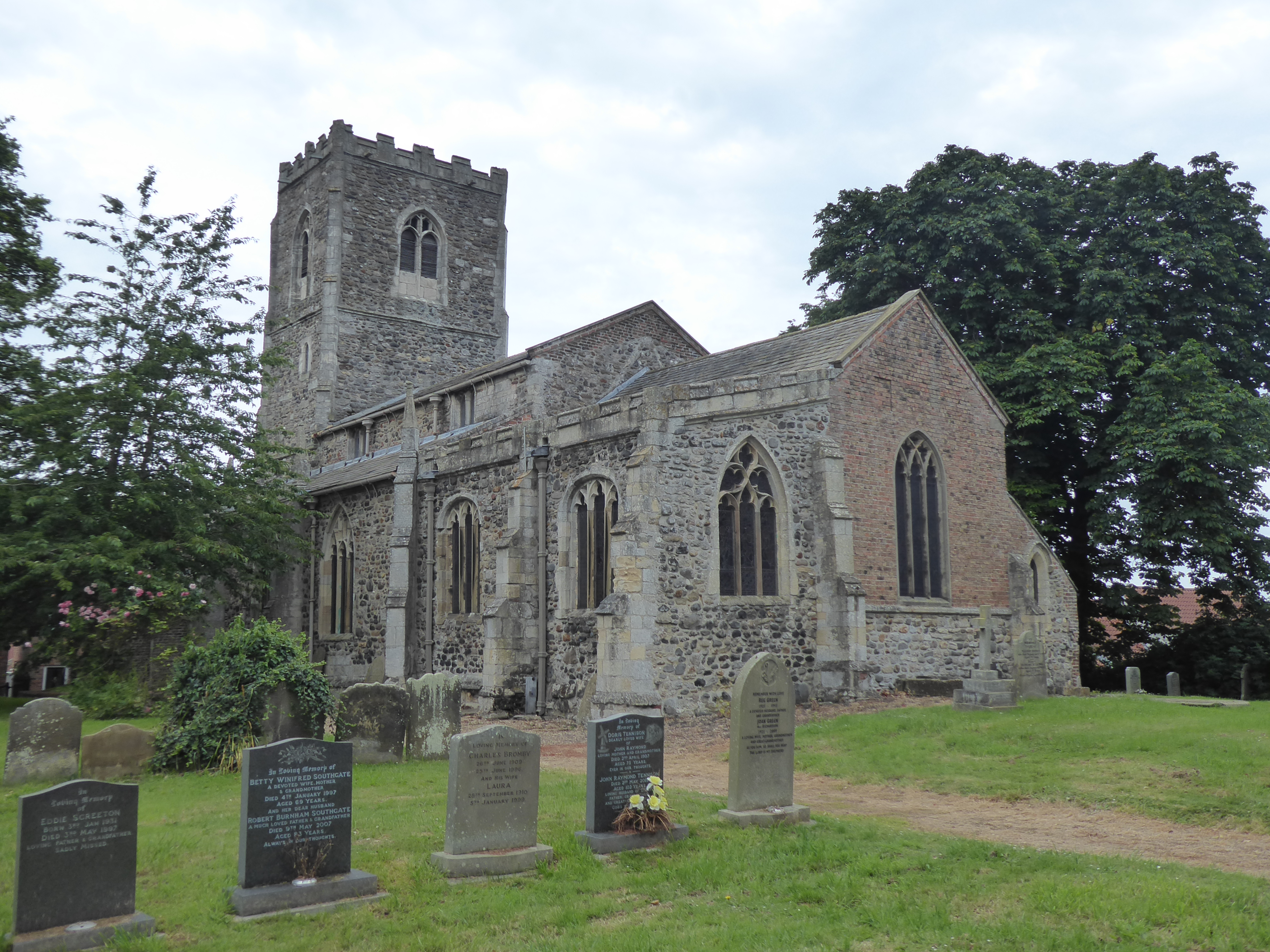
The church, in 2023

St Peter and St Paul's Church is the parish church of Burton Pidsea, a village in the East Riding of Yorkshire, in England.

A church in the village was first recorded around 1160. Parts of the nave and tower may date from this period, while the chancel was added in the early 13th century. The nave was rebuilt and a south aisle and chapel added in the 14th century, while the tower was rebuilt in the 15th century. The porch was rebuilt around 1800, then the church was restored by R. S. Smith between 1866 and 1868, the work including the rebuilding of the chancel. The building was grade I listed in 1966.

The church is built of cobble with stone dressings, a brick porch and a slate roof. It consists of a nave with a clerestory, north and south aisles, a south porch, a chancel with a south chapel and a north vestry, and a west tower embraced by the aisles. The tower has three stages, a moulded plinth, diagonal buttresses, chamfered string courses, a pointed three-light west window, pointed two-light bell openings, and an embattled parapet. Along the aisles are pinnacled buttresses. Inside, there is an octagonal 13th-century font.

== See also ==
- Grade I listed buildings in the East Riding of Yorkshire
- Listed buildings in Burton Pidsea
