= Grimston, East Riding of Yorkshire =

Hamlet in the East Riding of Yorkshire, England

Coordinates: 53°47′55″N 0°03′32″W

Grimston
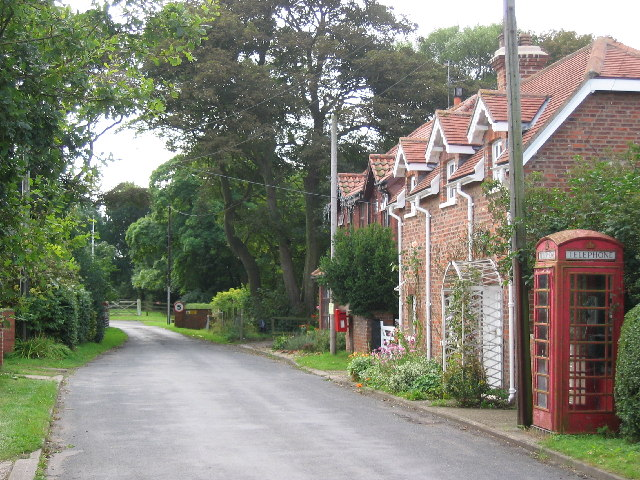

- Location within the East Riding of Yorkshire
- OS grid reference: TA279353
  - London: 155 mi (249 km) S
- Civil parish: East Garton
- Unitary authority: East Riding of Yorkshire
- Ceremonial county: East Riding of Yorkshire
- Region: Yorkshire and the Humber
- Country: England
- Sovereign state: United Kingdom
- Post town: HULL
- Postcode district: HU11
- Dialling code: 01964
- Police: Humberside
- Fire: Humberside
- Ambulance: Yorkshire
- UK Parliament: Beverley and Holderness

Grimston is a hamlet in the civil parish of East Garton, in the East Riding of Yorkshire, England, in an area known as Holderness. It is situated approximately 6 miles (9.7 km) north-west of Withernsea town centre.

Grimston lies east of the B1242 road near to the North Sea coast.

The name Grimston derives from the Old Norse personal name Grimr and the Old English tūn meaning 'settlement'.

To the north of the hamlet, on the coast, is an ancient moated site, dating from the 12th to 14th centuries, formerly the site of a fortified medieval manor house. It was the seat of the Grimston family until a fire in the mid-17th century.

The family then built a new manor house at Grimston Garth in 18th-century Gothic style. Grimston Garth lies south of the hamlet on a private road. The stable block at Grimston Garth was designated a Grade II* listed building in 1966 and is now recorded in the National Heritage List for England, maintained by Historic England.

== See also ==
- Listed buildings in East Garton
