= The Nancy =

Listed building in the East Riding of Yorkshire, England

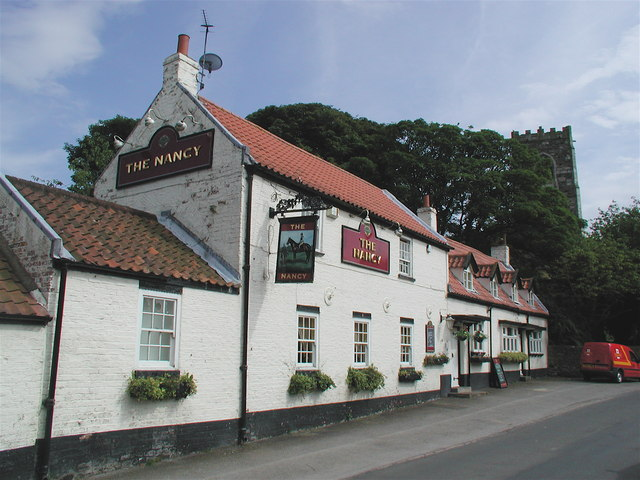
- The pub in 2006

- Location within East Riding of Yorkshire

General information
- Status: Converted to restaurant, tearoom, ice cream parlour and bar
- Type: Public house (former)
- Location: Church Street, Burton Pidsea, East Riding of Yorkshire, England
- Coordinates: 53.7616°N 0.1024°W
- Year built: Late 18th century
- Renovated: 2014

Listed Building – Grade II
- Official name: The Nancy public house
- Designated: 6 July 1987
- Reference no.: 1083493

The Nancy is a historic former pub on Church Street in Burton Pidsea, a village in the East Riding of Yorkshire, England.

Several buildings were constructed on Burton Pidsea's village green in the 18th century. The core of what is now the pub was built for the village blacksmith in the 18th century, probably incorporating an earlier building. By 1852, it had been converted into a pub, named for Nancy, a successful racehorse bred in the village. The building was Grade II listed in 1987. Around 2014, it was renovated at a cost of £250,000, to serve as a restaurant, tearoom and ice cream parlour in addition to a bar.

The pub is built of colourwashed red brick with a pantile roof, and it is in two blocks. The left block has two storeys and three bays. It has a stepped brick cornice, tumbled-in brick to the raised gables, and contains sash windows. The right block has a single storey and attics, and four bays. It contains two doorways, varied windows, and four gabled roof dormers.

== See also ==
- Listed buildings in Burton Pidsea
