= Listed buildings in Keyingham =

Keyingham is a civil parish in the county of the East Riding of Yorkshire, England. It contains six listed buildings that are recorded in the National Heritage List for England. Of these, one is listed at Grade I, the highest of the three grades, and the others are at Grade II, the lowest grade. The parish contains the village of Keyingham and the surrounding countryside. The listed buildings consist of a church, a cross base in the churchyard, a vicarage, a farmhouse, and two former windmills.

== Key ==
Grade	Criteria
I	Buildings of exceptional interest, sometimes considered to be internationally important
II	Buildings of national importance and special interest

== Buildings ==
Name and location	Photograph	Date	Notes	Grade
St Nicholas' Church; 53.71112°N 0.11499°W		12th century	The church has been altered and extended through the centuries, including a restoration in 1888–93, and the rebuilding of the north aisle in 1914. It is built in cobbles, limestone and brick, it is partly pebbledashed, and has lead roofs. The church consists of a nave with a clerestory, north and south aisles, a south porch, a chancel with a south chapel, and a west tower. The tower has four stages, a plinth, buttresses, moulded string courses, a small blocked north door, a pointed west window with a hood mould, pointed bell openings with hood moulds, and a coped parapet.	I
Base of St Philip's Cross; 53.71118°N 0.11538°W	—	Medieval	The cross base is to the east of Ebor House. It is in stone, and consists of the stump of a square shaft on a square pedestal. The overall height is about 0.5 metres (1 ft 8 in).	II
The Old Vicarage; 53.71034°N 0.11355°W		Early 18th century	The house is in red brick on a plinth, with stepped eaves, and a pantile roof with tumbled-in brick to the raised gables. There are two storeys and five bays, the middle bay projecting slightly. The central doorway has a fanlight in an architrave, and the windows are sashes.	II
Windmill southwest of Mill House; 53.71208°N 0.11678°W		Late 18th century	The former tower windmill is in brick with traces of tarring. It consists of a circular tapering tower with eight storeys. On the ground floor are two segmental -arched entrances, and above are doorways, and windows, mostly casements, and one horizontally sliding sash window. On the top is a low octagonal roof and a weathervane.	II
Saltaugh Grange Farmhouse; 53.67646°N 0.12771°W	—	Early 19th century	The farmhouse, which incorporates earlier material, is in red brick on a rendered plinth, and has a Welsh slate roof. There are two storeys and a T-shaped plan. The south front has three bays, and a wing to the left. The doorway has half-columns, an entablature, and a fanlight in a panelled reveal. Most of the windows are sashes in architraves, and on the wing is a bow window. Inside, there are remnants of earlier timber framing.	II
Windmill at Mill Nurseries; 53.70741°N 0.10112°W		c. 1828	The former windmill, later incorporated in a house, is in colourwashed brick with a low-pitched hexagonal tile roof. It consists of a circular tapering tower with five storeys. It contains doorways and windows with segmental heads.	II
