= Listed buildings in Elstronwick =

Elstronwick is a civil parish in the county of the East Riding of Yorkshire, England. It contains seven listed buildings that are recorded in the National Heritage List for England. Of these, one is listed at Grade II*, the middle of the three grades, and the others are at Grade II, the lowest grade. The parish contains the villages of Elstronwick and Lelley, the hamlet of Danthorpe and the surrounding countryside. The listed buildings consist of houses, a farmhouse, a dovecote, a former windmill, a church and a war memorial.

== Key ==
Grade	Criteria
II*	Particularly important buildings of more than special interest
II	Buildings of national importance and special interest

== Buildings ==
Name and location	Photograph	Date	Notes	Grade
Danthorpe Hall; 53.77552°N 0.11382°W	—	Late 17th century	The house, which was later extended, is in rendered and pebbledashed red brick on a plinth, with grey brick dressings, rusticated quoins and slate roofs. There are two storeys, a main range of five bays, a later rear wing, and a cross-wing to the right. On the front is a gabled porch, and the windows are sashes. On the left gable end are two stone panels with raised square motifs under a dentilled quarter-round moulded cornice surmounted by brick pediments.	II
Elstronwick Hall; 53.77218°N 0.13466°W	—	Mid-18th century	The house was considerably extended in the late 19th century. The original part is in brown brick, the later part is in red brick with stone dressings, and both parts have slate roofs. The original block has two storeys and four bays, a continuous rear outshut and a rear wing. The doorway has a fanlight, the windows are sashes, most tripartite, and the openings are under cambered wedge lintels.	II
Bridge Farmhouse; 53.76350°N 0.13158°W	—	Late 18th century	The farmhouse is in colourwashed red brick, and has a pantile roof with raised gables. There is one storey and attics, and two bays, and a continuous rear outshut. On the front are two sash windows in moulding sash boxes, and the doorway is in the outshut.	II
Dovecote; 53.77670°N 0.16796°W	—	Late 18th century	The dovecote is in red brick with a hipped pantile roof. There are two storeys, on the ground floor is a doorway with a fanlight, and the upper floor contains an opening with timber pigeon holes.	II
Lelley Windmill; 53.77548°N 0.15101°W		1790	A former corn tower windmill, it is in tarred red brick, and consists of a tapering circular tower on a wide splayed base. It contains doorways and windows, all with segmental heads. On the top are the remains of the cap frame, and a cast iron wind shaft. Attached is a rectangular brick steam-engine room, and to the southwest is a brick chimney. Inside the mill much of the machinery has been retained, including a pair of millstones.	II*
St Lawrence's Church; 53.77226°N 0.12686°W		1875	The church was rebuilt using earlier material. It is built in stone with freestone dressings and a slate roof. The church consists of a nave and a chancel, and on the west gable is a timber bellcote with a broach spire and an ornamental slate roof.	II
Lelley War Memorial; 53.77450°N 0.16645°W		c. 1920	The war memorial consists of an angled brick wall, with two inset marble plaques and a timber bench running between them. The plaques are inscribed, and carry the names of those lost in the two World Wars.	II
