= Etton Mill =

Windmill in Etton, East Riding of Yorkshire, England

Coordinates: 53°52′22″N 0°30′34″W

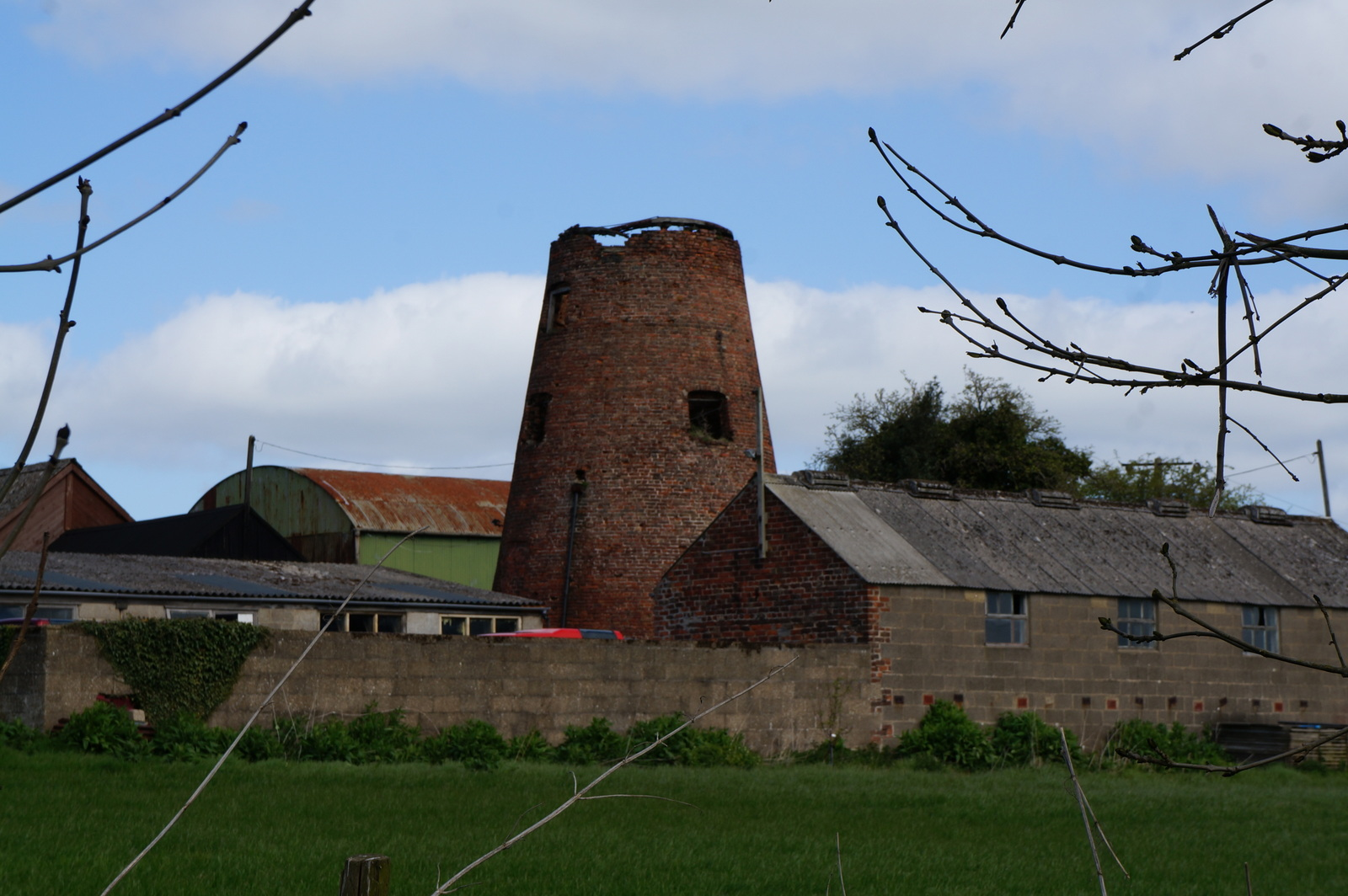
The building, in 2014

Etton Mill is a historic building in Etton, East Riding of Yorkshire, a village in England.

The windmill was built around 1790, to mill corn. It stopped working around 1890, and became derelict, but survives as a ruin. The building was grade II listed in 1987.

The tower windmill is built of red brick. It has a circular plan, and is tapering, with a height of 35 feet (11 m). There are four storeys, on the ground floor is a doorway, above is a loading door, and the two top floors contain segmental-headed openings. Inside, there is a post rising from the ground to the second floor, to support two millstones, but the machinery is missing, as are the cap and sails.

== See also ==
- Listed buildings in Etton, East Riding of Yorkshire
