= Blue Hall, Garton =

House in the East Riding of Yorkshire, England

Coordinates: 53°48′05″N 0°05′08″W

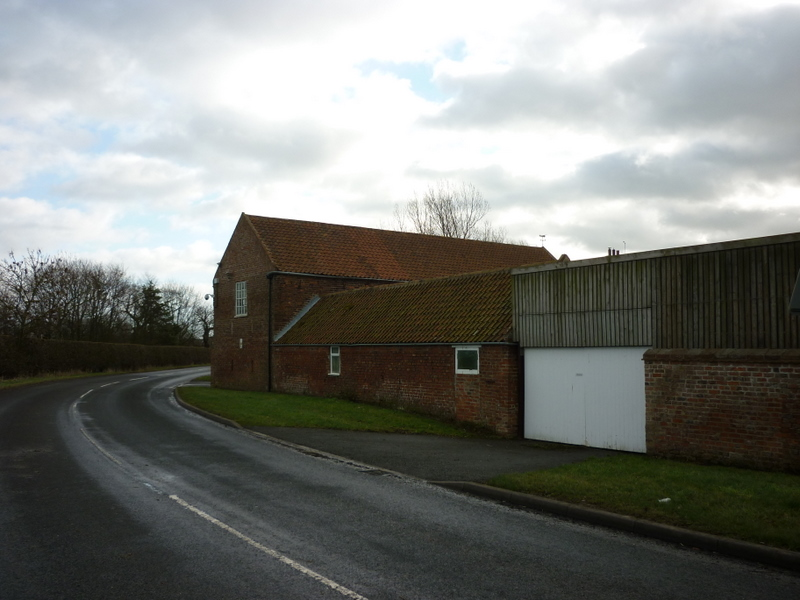
The building, in 2011

Blue Hall is a historic building in Garton, a village in the East Riding of Yorkshire, in England.

The building was constructed around 1700 for the Constable family, as the village's manor house, on a moated site – part of the moat survives as a duck pond. The house soon became known as Blue Hall for the colour of its roof tiles. In 1774, it was sold to the Wright family, who used it as a farmhouse. In the early 19th century it was reduced from three storeys to two, and the east end of the service range was demolished. The house passed through numerous hands before in 1990, it was sold separately from the farm. Many of the windows were replaced in the 20th century, and the house was partly remodelled in 1992 and 1993. The building was grade II* listed in 1966.

The house is built of orange brick, with a floor band and hipped pantile roofs. There are two storeys and an L-shaped plan, with a front range of five bays. The doorway is in the centre, above it is a cross-mullioned window, and the other windows are casements. Inside, the original staircase survives, now rising into the attics, and there is much early woodwork, including doors and upstairs floorboards. Some of the doors retain their original locks.

== See also ==
- Grade II* listed buildings in the East Riding of Yorkshire
- Listed buildings in East Garton
