= St Peter's Church, Humbleton =

Church in Humbleton, East Riding of Yorkshire, England

Coordinates: 53°47′44″N 0°08′23″W

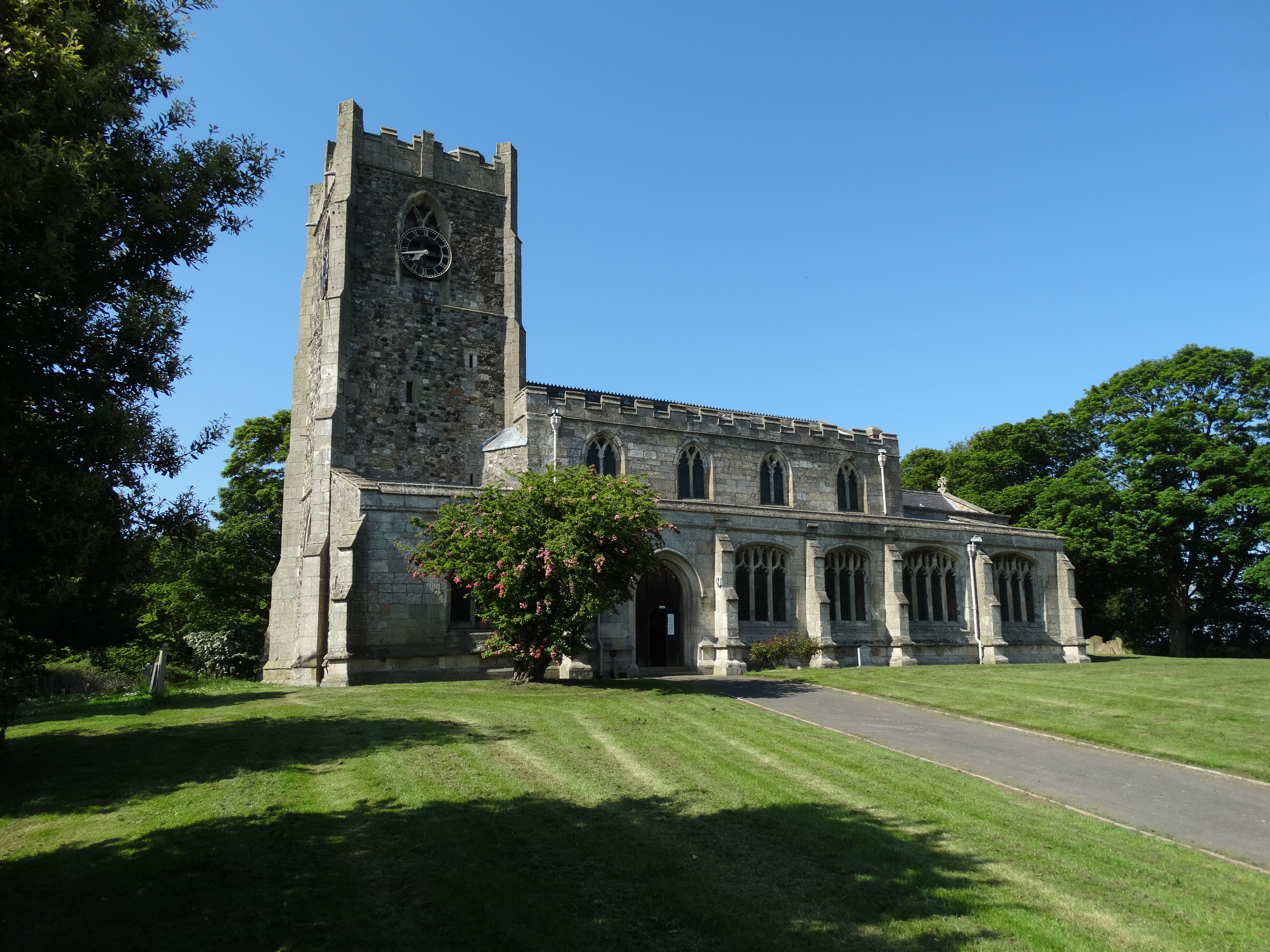
The church, in 2016

St Peter's Church is the parish church of Humbleton, a village in the East Riding of Yorkshire, in England.

There was a church in Humbleton by the 12th century, while the oldest part of the current building is the 13th-century nave. The chancel was constructed later in the century and the tower in the 14th century. The aisles of the nave were rebuilt in the 15th century, and around 1555 the south aisle was widened and the south chapel built or enlarged. The chancel was repaired in brick and its windows altered in the 17th century. The porch was rebuilt in 1744. Between 1888 and 1889, the church was restored by John Loughborough Pearson and again in 1906 by John Bilson. The porch was removed in 1990. The church has been grade I listed since 1966.

The church is built of cobbles and stone, with the chancel in brick, and has a slate roof. The church consists of a nave with a clerestory, north and south aisles, a chancel, and a west tower embraced by the aisles. The tower has three stages, diagonal buttresses, moulded string courses, a three-light pointed west window with a hood mould, slit windows on the middle stage, clock faces, bell openings with Y-tracery, and an embattled parapet. The south door is late 14th century and retains its original hinges. Inside, there is the upper part of an alabaster memorial to William Thompson, who died in 1637.

== See also ==
- Grade I listed buildings in the East Riding of Yorkshire
- Listed buildings in Humbleton
