= Keyingham New Mill =

Windmill in Keyingham, East Riding of Yorkshire, England

Coordinates: 53°42′27″N 0°06′04″W

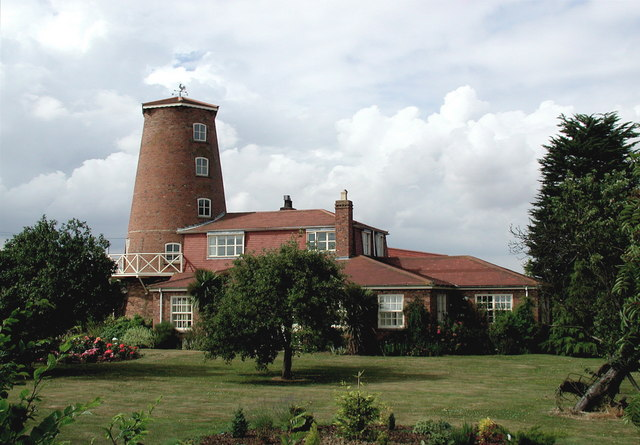
The building, in 2006

Keyingham New Mill is a historic building in Keyingham, a village in the East Riding of Yorkshire, in England.

The windmill was constructed in about 1828 as a corn mill. In 1897 it was struck by lightning and, though not seriously damaged, half the paint peeled off and the chain was fused together. It closed in about 1900 and remained vacant until about 1980 when it was converted into a house, the work including a sustantial extension and new porch, roof and floors. The building was grade II listed in 1987.

The former windmill is built of colourwashed brick with a low-pitched hexagonal tile roof. It consists of a circular tapering tower with five storeys. It contains doorways and windows with segmental heads.

== See also ==
- Listed buildings in Keyingham
