= Lelley Windmill =

Windmill in the East Riding of Yorkshire, England

Coordinates: 53°46′32″N 0°09′04″W

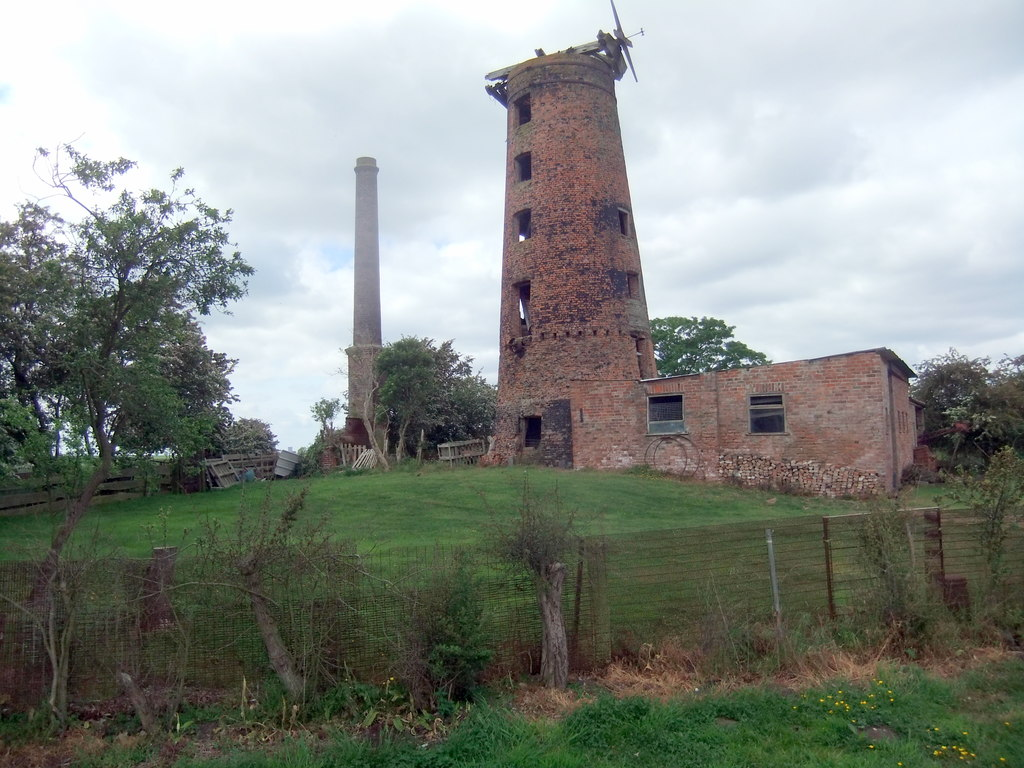
The building, in 2020

Lelley Windmill is a historic building in Lelley, a village in the East Riding of Yorkshire, in England.

The windmill was built in 1790 for Peter Sumper to mill corn. It probably reuses the base of a windmill built earlier in the century. The building was strengthened in the early 19th century to allow the insertion of a second production floor. A steam engine was installed in 1873 but soon fell out of use. Milling ended in the early 20th century, but the machinery remained in place. The building was grade II listed in 1987, and was then upgraded to grade II* in 2021. Historic England described it as "encapsulat[ing] the impact of the Industrial Revolution on small-scale rural industry in Yorkshire".

The mill is built of tarred red brick, and consists of a six-storey tapering circular tower on a wide splayed base. It contains doorways and windows, all with segmental heads. On the top are the remains of the cap frame, and a cast iron wind shaft. The sails are missing. Attached is a rectangular brick steam-engine room, and to the southwest is a brick chimney. Inside the mill much of the machinery has been retained, including a flour dressing machine, grain bins, a pair of millstones, and assorted wheels, gears and pulleys. A brick-built engine room annex has a chimney on a pedestal and contains the vertical steam boiler.

== See also ==
- Grade II* listed buildings in the East Riding of Yorkshire
- Listed buildings in Elstronwick
