= Lelley =

Village in the East Riding of Yorkshire, England

Coordinates: 53°46′32″N 0°10′02″W

- Village
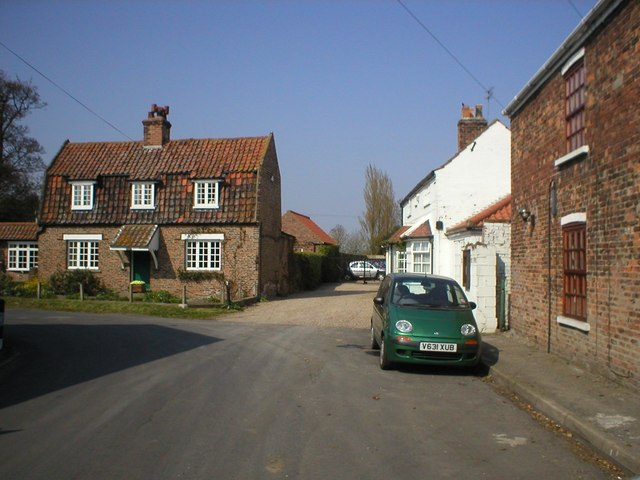
- Main Street in Lelley

- Location within the East Riding of Yorkshire
- OS grid reference: TA209325
  - London: 155 mi (249 km) S
- Civil parish: Elstronwick
- Unitary authority: East Riding of Yorkshire
- Ceremonial county: East Riding of Yorkshire
- Region: Yorkshire and the Humber
- Country: England
- Sovereign state: United Kingdom
- Post town: HULL
- Postcode district: HU12
- Dialling code: 01482
- Police: Humberside
- Fire: Humberside
- Ambulance: Yorkshire
- UK Parliament: Beverley and Holderness

Lelley is a small village in the civil parish of Elstronwick, in the East Riding of Yorkshire, England, in an area known as Holderness. It is situated approximately 7 miles (11 km) north-east of Kingston upon Hull city centre and 3 miles (5 km) north of Hedon.

Lelley was formerly a township in the parish of Preston, in 1866 Lelley became a civil parish, on 1 April 1935 the parish was abolished and merged with Elstronwick. In 1931 the parish had a population of 112.

Lelley comes from the word 'Lelle' which means 'clearing in the woods'.

The village contains a public house, two benches (one a war memorial and the other a millennium bench) and a telephone box.

Lelley Wesleyan Methodist Church was built in the village in 1859.

In 1823 Lelley was in the parish of Preston and the Wapentake and Liberty of Holderness. Population was 119, which included a carrier who operated between the village and Hull once a week.

Lelley Windmill, a six-storey corn mill completed in 1790, is a Grade II* Listed Building.

== Drug haul ==
In 5 May 2024, Lelley was the scene of a major drug haul.

== See also ==
- Listed buildings in Elstronwick
