= Etton, East Riding of Yorkshire =

Village and civil parish in the East Riding of Yorkshire, England

Coordinates: 53°52′42″N 0°30′46″W

Etton
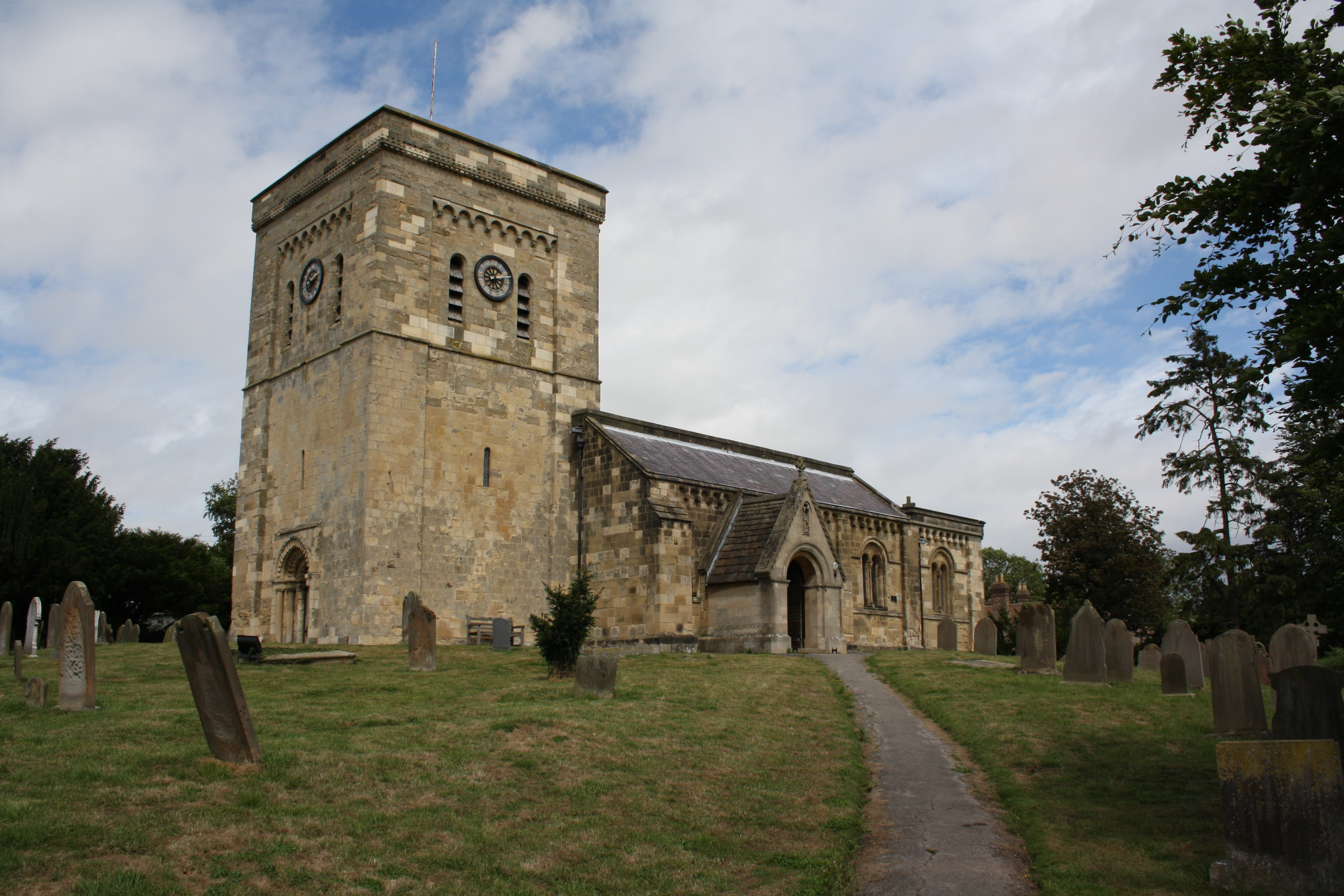
- St Mary's Church, Etton

- Location within the East Riding of Yorkshire
- Population: 277 (2011 census)
- OS grid reference: SE980435
  - London: 160 mi (260 km) S
- Civil parish: Etton
- Unitary authority: East Riding of Yorkshire
- Ceremonial county: East Riding of Yorkshire
- Region: Yorkshire and the Humber
- Country: England
- Sovereign state: United Kingdom
- Post town: BEVERLEY
- Postcode district: HU17
- Dialling code: 01430
- Police: Humberside
- Fire: Humberside
- Ambulance: Yorkshire
- UK Parliament: Beverley and Holderness

Etton is a village and civil parish in the East Riding of Yorkshire, England. It is situated approximately 4 miles (6 km) north-west of Beverley town centre and 2 miles (3.2 km) west of the village of Leconfield. 1 mile (1.6 km) to the south-east is Cherry Burton. To the west lie the hamlets of Kiplingcotes (3 miles (5 km) away due west) and Gardham (1.5 miles (2.4 km) to the south-west). South Dalton lies 1.5 miles to the north-west.

The village itself lies to the west of the B1248 road in its own shallow dale. The village's buildings are almost entirely situated either side of Main Street. Along this street lie both the village pub and St Mary's Church, Etton, which is a Grade II* listed building.

The civil parish is formed by the village of Etton and part of the hamlet of Kiplingcotes. According to the 2011 UK Census, Etton parish had a population of 277, a decrease on the 2001 UK Census figure of 285.

The name Etton derives from the Old English Eatatūn meaning 'Eata's settlement'.

Etton is significant as the 1584 birthplace of Rev John Lothropp, founder of Barnstable, Massachusetts. Thomas Carling, who emigrated from Etton to Canada in 1818, used 'a recipe from his native Yorkshire' to found the Carling Brewery in 1840.

Etton is also home to the Holderness Hunt, whose kennels are located on the south-east of the village.

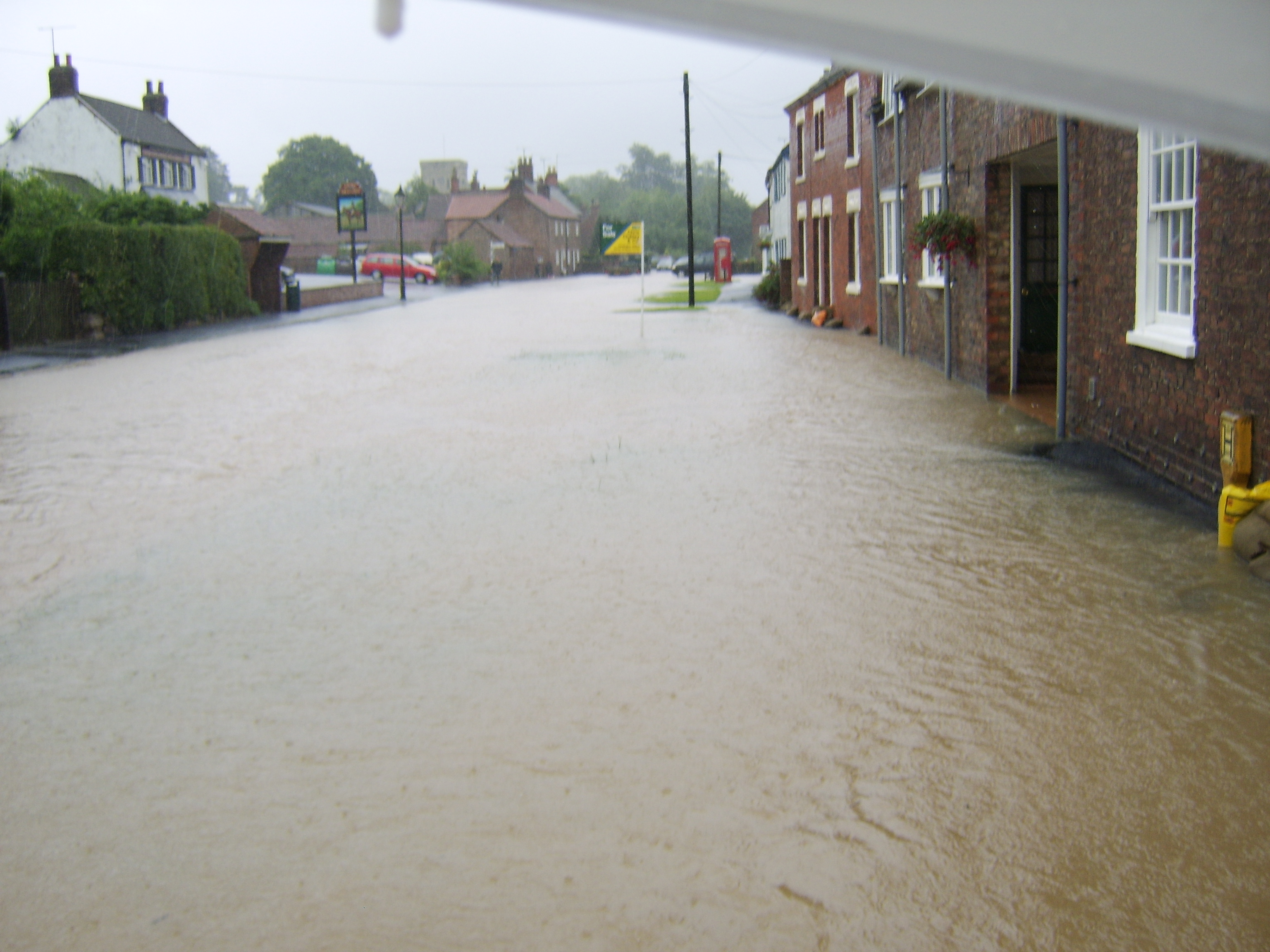
Main Street, flooded in June 2007

In 1823 Etton was in the Wapentake of Harthill. The village had a population of 380, with occupations including nine farmers, two shopkeepers, a carpenter & wheelwright, a boot & shoe maker, a tailor, a corn miller, and the landlord of the Light Dragoon public house. There were two gentlemen, one gentlewoman, a Lady, a vicar, and a schoolmaster who was also the parish clerk. Once a week two carriers operated between the village and Beverley. The patron of the village Church of St Mary was the Archbishop of York.

Etton has been known to suffer quite badly during floods, due to its position in a small valley, with the most recent flood on 25 June 2007.

== See also ==
- Etton Mill
- Listed buildings in Etton, East Riding of Yorkshire
