= Newmill =

Village in Moray, Scotland

Coordinates: 57.5593°N 2.9457°W

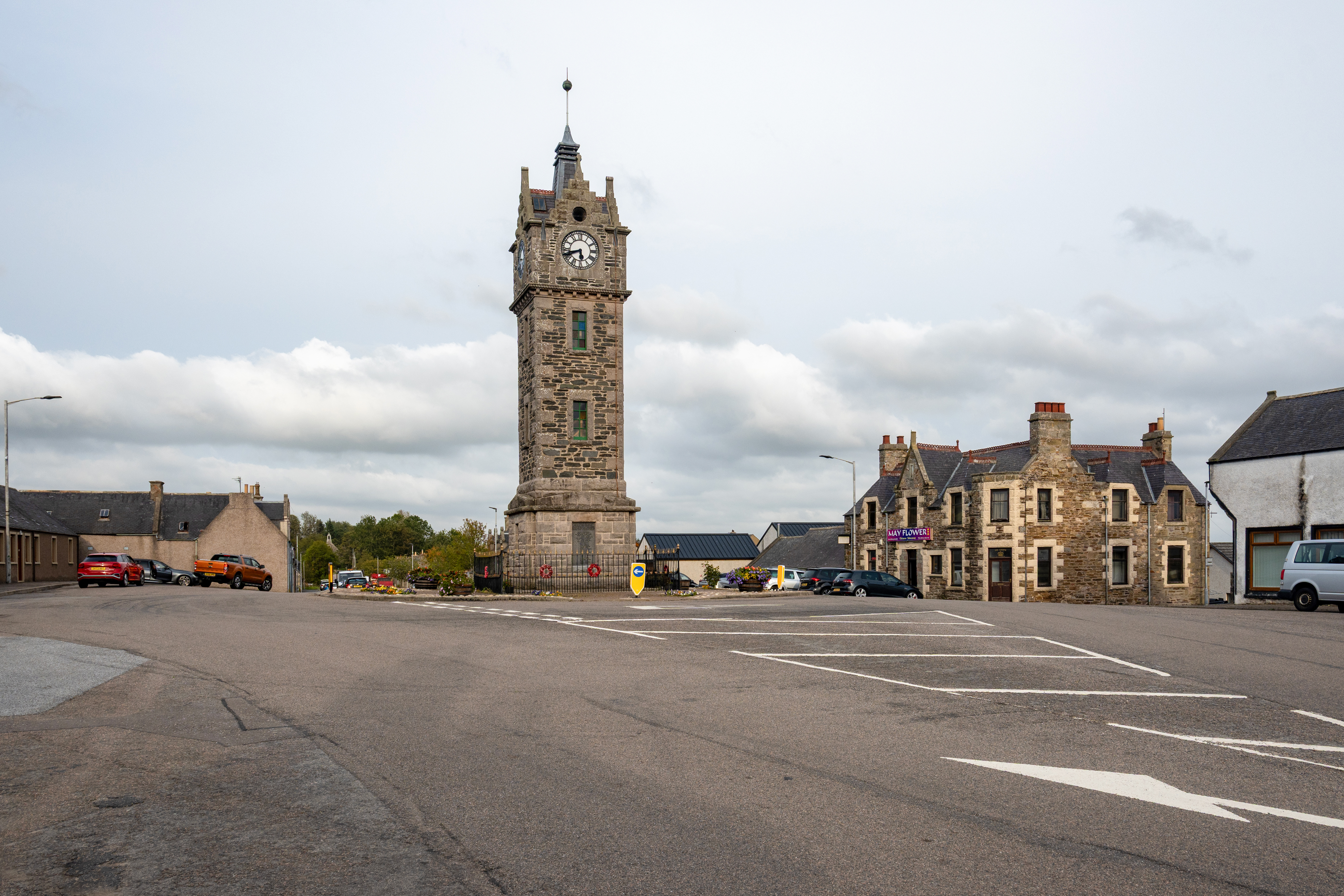
- The Square, Newmill, showing the war memorial clock tower

- Location within Moray
- Population: 452 (2001 census)
- OS grid reference: NJ435525
- Council area: Moray
- Lieutenancy area: Banffshire
- Country: Scotland
- Sovereign state: United Kingdom
- Post town: KEITH
- Postcode district: AB55
- Dialling code: 01542
- Police: Scotland
- Fire: Scottish
- Ambulance: Scottish
- UK Parliament: Moray
- Scottish Parliament: Moray

Newmill is a planned village 2 kilometres (1.2 mi) north of the town of Keith in the Moray council area of north-east Scotland. The resident population at the 2001 census was recorded as 452.

== History ==
The current street-plan of the village was laid out in approximately 1759 by the Earls of Fife, but there are records of a much earlier settlement dating back to 1535 when a meal mill was built by Bishop Crystall. The Castle of Glengerrick once stood at the site of the village church, now a private dwelling.

Slate from the local quarry was used in the renovation of Pluscarden Abbey and the Convent of Greyfriars in Elgin.

In 1905, the Newmill Literary Society, supported by the philanthropist Andrew Carnegie, built the Newmill Institute, now the Village Hall.

In the centre of the village square is a war memorial, a four-stage clock tower, built in 1922–23 and designed by F. A. Robertson.

== Services ==
Services in Newmill include the village post office which is now closed.

== Education ==
The village is served by Newmill Primary School, whilst secondary pupils travel to Keith Grammar School or Buckie high school and more.

== Notable people ==
- James Gordon Bennett, Sr., founder and publisher of the New York Herald, grew up in Newmill.
