= Flinton, East Riding of Yorkshire =

Village in the East Riding of Yorkshire, England

Coordinates: 53.807771°N 0.147486°W

Flinton
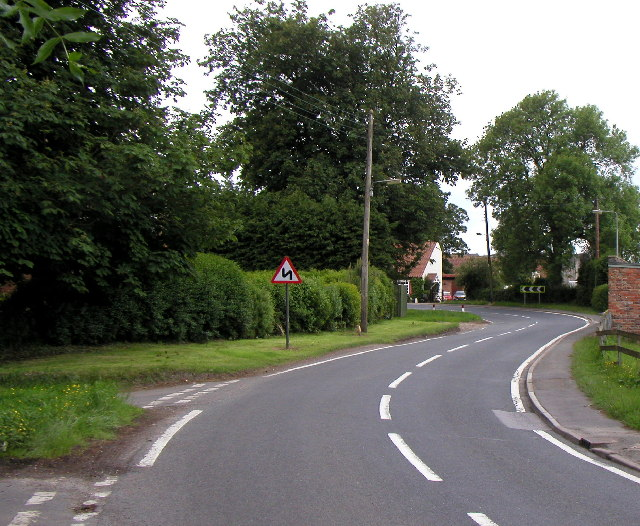
- Entering Flinton from the east

- Location within the East Riding of Yorkshire
- OS grid reference: TA220362
  - London: 160 mi (260 km) S
- Civil parish: Humbleton
- Unitary authority: East Riding of Yorkshire
- Ceremonial county: East Riding of Yorkshire
- Region: Yorkshire and the Humber
- Country: England
- Sovereign state: United Kingdom
- Post town: HULL
- Postcode district: HU11
- Dialling code: 01964
- Police: Humberside
- Fire: Humberside
- Ambulance: Yorkshire
- UK Parliament: Beverley and Holderness

Flinton is a village in the civil parish of Humbleton, in the East Riding of Yorkshire, England, in an area known as Holderness. It is situated approximately 9 miles (14 km) north-east of Hull city centre and lies on the B1238 road.

Flinton was formerly a township in the parish of Humbleton, in 1866 Flinton became a civil parish, on 1 April 1935 the parish was abolished and merged with Humbleton. In 1931 the parish had a population of 93.

In 1823 the village was in the Wapentake of Holderness. Population at the time was 125.

The name Flinton derives from the Old English flinttūn meaning 'flint settlement'.
