= Garton =

Village in the East Riding of Yorkshire, England

Coordinates: 53°48′01″N 0°04′53″W

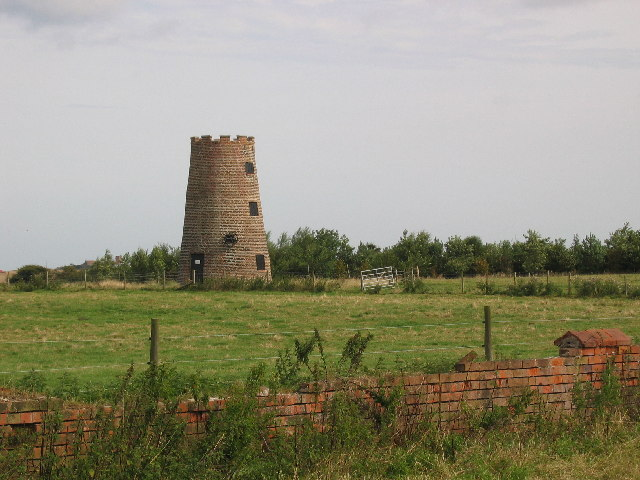
- Blue Mill

- Location within the East Riding of Yorkshire
- OS grid reference: TA 264 354
  - London: 155 mi (249 km) S
- Civil parish: East Garton
- Unitary authority: East Riding of Yorkshire
- Ceremonial county: East Riding of Yorkshire
- Region: Yorkshire and the Humber
- Country: England
- Sovereign state: United Kingdom
- Post town: HULL
- Postcode district: HU11
- Dialling code: 01964
- Police: Humberside
- Fire: Humberside
- Ambulance: Yorkshire
- UK Parliament: Beverley and Holderness

Garton (or Garton in Holderness) is a village in the East Riding of Yorkshire, England, in an area known as Holderness. It is situated approximately 7 miles (11 km) north-west of Withernsea town centre. It lies on the B1242 road.

It forms part of the civil parish of East Garton.

== History ==
The name Garton derives from the Old English gāratūn meaning 'settlement on a triangular piece of land'.

St Michael's Church, Garton was designated a Grade I listed building in 1966 and is now recorded in the National Heritage List for England, maintained by Historic England.

Blue Hall to the west of the village was designated in 1966 as a Grade II* listed building.

In 1823 inhabitants in the village numbered 160. Occupations included ten farmers, a bricklayer, a carpenter and a blacksmith. Two carriers operated between the village and Hull on Tuesdays.

During the Second World War, a German, moored, magnetic influence mine, TMA-1 came ashore at Corton sands at Garton. Lcdr. Roy Berryman Edwards, RN, DSO, BEM took the assignment to dismantle the mine with U.S. Navy Mine Disposalman John Martin Howard observing the operation. The mine detonated during the disposal operation with the full four hundred and seventy pounds of charge. The detonation killed Howard and Edwards and scattered debris for two hundred yards in each direction along the beach.

== See also ==
- Listed buildings in Garton
