= Humbleton =

Village and civil parish in the East Riding of Yorkshire, England

Coordinates: 53°47′34″N 0°08′15″W

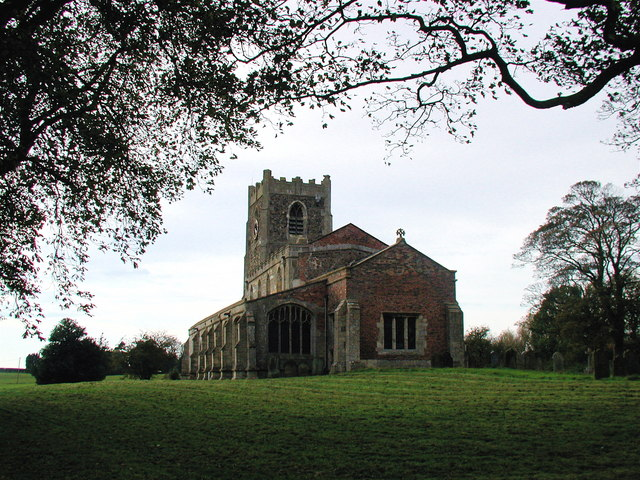
- St Peter's Church, Humbleton

- Location within the East Riding of Yorkshire
- Population: 208 (2011 census)
- OS grid reference: TA227345
  - London: 155 mi (249 km) S
- Civil parish: Humbleton
- Unitary authority: East Riding of Yorkshire
- Ceremonial county: East Riding of Yorkshire
- Region: Yorkshire and the Humber
- Country: England
- Sovereign state: United Kingdom
- Post town: HULL
- Postcode district: HU11
- Dialling code: 01964
- Police: Humberside
- Fire: Humberside
- Ambulance: Yorkshire
- UK Parliament: Beverley and Holderness

Humbleton is a village and civil parish in the East Riding of Yorkshire, England, in an area known as Holderness. It is situated approximately 9 miles (14 km) north-east of Hull city centre.

== Overview ==
The origin of the name Humbleton is uncertain. The second element of the name derives from the Old English tūn meaning 'settlement'. The origin of the first element has many theories. It may derive from the Old English humol or the Old Norse humul meaning 'rounded hill', humele or humli meaning 'hops' (the plant), or perhaps from the Old Norse personal name Humli.

The civil parish is formed by the villages of Humbleton and Flinton.

According to the 2011 UK census, Humbleton parish had a population of 208, a reduction of one on the 2001 UK census figure.

The Anglican St Peter's Church, Humbleton is a Grade I listed building.

Humbleton has a cricket field.

In 1823 inhabitants in the village numbered 136. Occupations included three farmers, a shoemaker, a tailor, a carpenter and a blacksmith. A carrier operated between the village and Hull on Tuesdays and Fridays. There was a public school for poor parish children, the school teacher receiving a salary of 21 shillings. The parish is the birthplace of Admiral John Storr.

== See also ==
- Listed buildings in Humbleton
