= Keyingham =

Village and civil parish in the East Riding of Yorkshire, England

Coordinates: 53°42′40″N 0°06′45″W

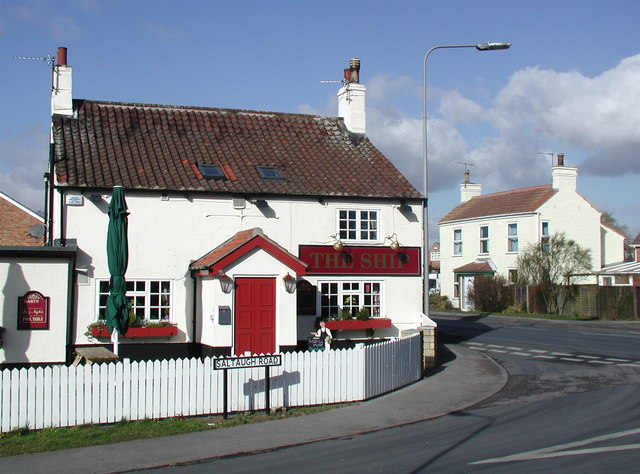
- Ship Inn, Main Street

- Location within the East Riding of Yorkshire
- Population: 2,314 (2011 census)
- OS grid reference: TA245255
  - London: 150 mi (240 km) S
- Civil parish: Keyingham
- Unitary authority: East Riding of Yorkshire
- Ceremonial county: East Riding of Yorkshire
- Region: Yorkshire and the Humber
- Country: England
- Sovereign state: United Kingdom
- Post town: HULL
- Postcode district: HU12
- Dialling code: 01964
- Police: Humberside
- Fire: Humberside
- Ambulance: Yorkshire
- UK Parliament: Beverley and Holderness

Keyingham is a village and civil parish in the East Riding of Yorkshire, England. The village is situated approximately 10 miles (16 km) east of Kingston upon Hull city centre and lies on the A1033 road.

== History ==
A possible Iron Age or Roman enclosure was 800 yards (1 km) north-east from the present village, identified by aerial photography, and at the north and south of the village is evidence of medieval earthworks, field boundaries, ponds, trackways, and ridges and furrows. Less than 1 mile (1.6 km) west of the village is the site of St Philips Well, a medieval water spring.

The name Keyingham probably derives from the Old English cǣgingashām or cǣginghām meaning 'the village of the people of the key', or 'the village at the key place'. This perhaps refers to a key shaped hill nearby, or some other topographical feature.

Keyingham is listed in the 1086 Domesday Book as in the Hundred of Holderness, with 31 households, 30 villagers, one priest and a church. Eight ploughlands and 24 acres (0.1 km^{2}) of meadow are recorded. In 1066 Thorfridh held the lordship, this transferred by 1086 to Drogo of la BeuvriËre, who was also Tenant-in-chief to King William I.

In 1823, Keyingham (or Kyingham) was a civil parish in the Wapentake and Liberty of Holderness. The patronage of the ecclesiastical parish and church was under the Archbishop of York. In 1802, the interest from a bequest of 200 shillings was left for the education of poor parish children of 'Kayingham', administered by the churchwardens, and the incumbent who held his post as a perpetual curate. Parish population in 1823 was 639. Occupations included eight farmers, two blacksmiths, two wheelwrights, four grocers, a corn miller, six shoemakers, two tailors, one of whom was also a draper, a bricklayer who was also the parish clerk, a school master, the landlord of The Blue Bell and the landlady of The Gate public houses. Two carriers operated between the village and Hull twice weekly.

Keyingham was served from 1854 to 1964 by Keyingham railway station on the Hull and Holderness Railway.

== Community ==
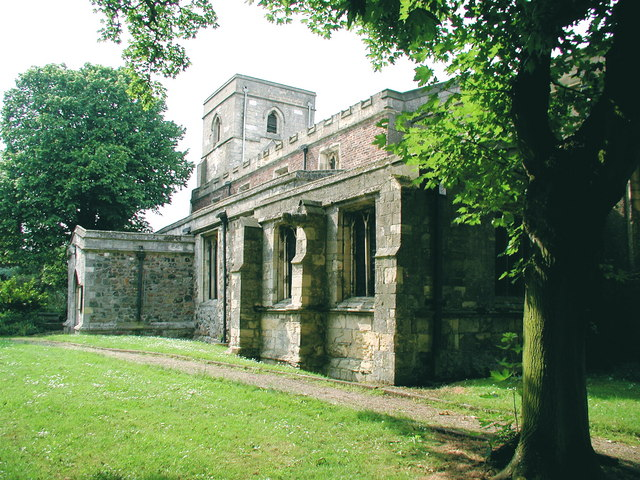
St Nicholas' Church

According to the 2011 UK Census, Keyingham parish had a population of 2,314, an increase on the 2001 UK Census figure of 2,302.

The Anglican St Nicholas' Church, Keyingham is a Grade I listed building. Its spire was removed and parapets rebuilt in the late 1960s. Within St Nicholas' Church south chapel was a shrine to Philip Ingleberd (died c. 1324). The remains of the medieval ashlar St Philip's Cross, Grade II listed and dedicated to Ingleberd, stands on Church Lane. Further parish listed structures are a farmhouse, 2.5 miles (4.0 km) to the south at Little Dam Lane, The Old Vicarage on Station Road, and two windmill towers, one on Mill Road, the other on Ottringham Road.

Keyingham amenities and businesses include a doctor's surgery, a Co-operative food store, a newsagent, a butchers, takeaway outlets, a funeral directors, hairdressers, and a village hall. The village public house is the Ship Inn on Main Street. A further public house and a former coaching inn on Main Street, the Blue Bell, closed in 2012 now re-opened. Two horticultural nurseries which cover an area almost equal to that of the village are at the east and west of the village. To the west are sand and gravel pits. Highland cattle are kept in a field just outside the village.

== Education ==
The village has one primary school, Keyingham Primary School. It was opened to pupils at the beginning of the 2007 school year, replacing the former infant school on the same site. The new school combines the former junior and infant schools, the junior school being based in a former board school building across the road which closed in 2006. The schools serve children from Keyingham and the neighbouring village of Ottringham just over 1 mile (1.6 km) to the east, there are no secondary schools.

== See also ==
- Listed buildings in Keyingham
