= Burton Pidsea =

Village and civil parish in the East Riding of Yorkshire, England

Coordinates: 53.762903°N 0.106526°W

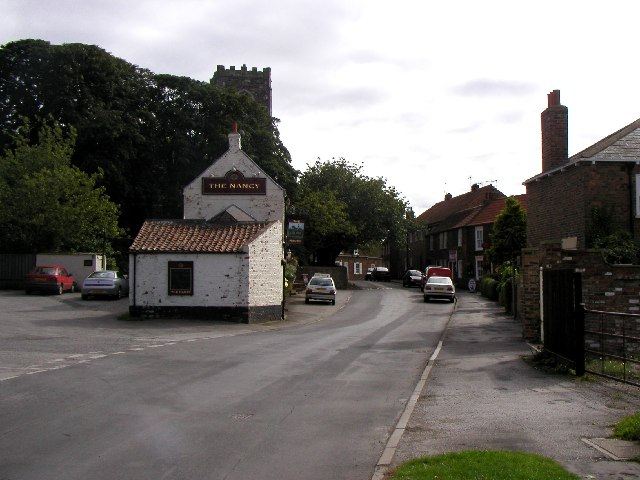
- Church Street, Burton Pidsea

- Location within the East Riding of Yorkshire
- Population: 944 (2011 census)
- OS grid reference: TA249312
  - London: 155 mi (249 km) S
- Civil parish: Burton Pidsea
- Unitary authority: East Riding of Yorkshire
- Ceremonial county: East Riding of Yorkshire
- Region: Yorkshire and the Humber
- Country: England
- Sovereign state: United Kingdom
- Post town: HULL
- Postcode district: HU12
- Dialling code: 01964
- Police: Humberside
- Fire: Humberside
- Ambulance: Yorkshire
- UK Parliament: Beverley and Holderness

Burton Pidsea is a village and civil parish in the Holderness area of the East Riding of Yorkshire, England. The village is situated approximately 11 miles (18 km) east of Hull city centre.

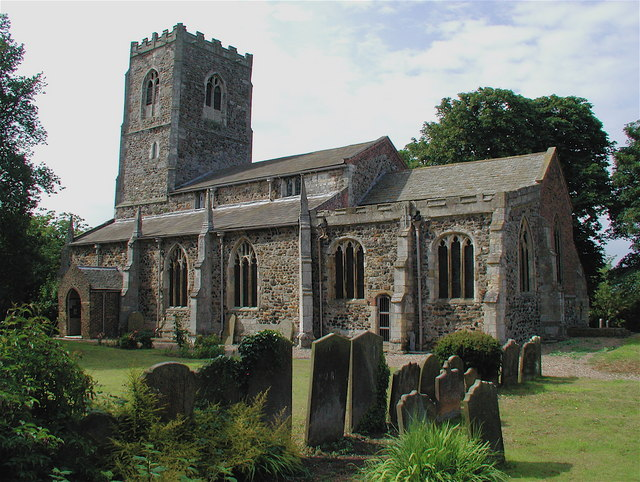
St. Peter and St. Paul's Church, Burton Pidsea

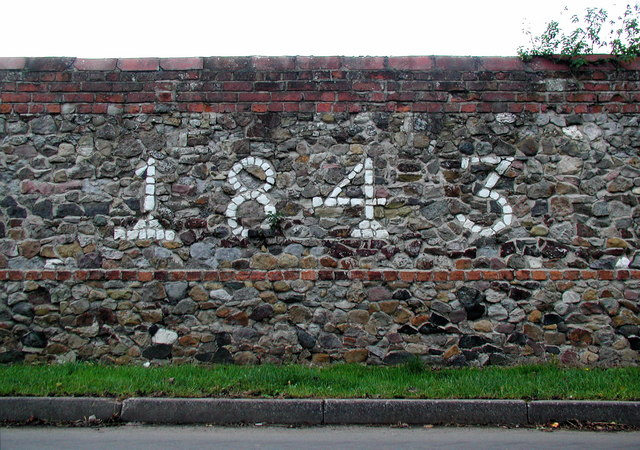
The boundary wall with the year 1843 inlaid in the stonework at Edward Baxter's brickworks near the junction of New Road and Main Road, Burton Pidsea. The site of the former brickworks is now a residential area.

According to the 2021 UK census, Burton Pidsea parish had a population of 979, compared to the 2011 UK census figure of 944, which itself was an increase on the 2001 UK census figure of 888.

There is a church, village hall, a minimarket shop which incorporates on its forecourt a petrol station, two public houses including The Nancy (both of which are now closed), a primary school and a playing field.

Other local amenities include a bowls club.

St Peter and St Paul's Church, Burton Pidsea was designated a Grade I listed building in 1966 and is now recorded in the National Heritage List for England, maintained by Historic England.

The name Burton derives from the Old English burhtūn meaning 'settlement at the fort'. Pidsea was originally a separate village, deriving from the Old English pidesǣ meaning 'marsh lake'.

== See also ==
- Listed buildings in Burton Pidsea
