= Grade I listed buildings in the East Riding of Yorkshire =

East Riding of Yorkshire shown in England

There are over 9,300 Grade I listed buildings in England. This page is a list of the 111 of these buildings in the ceremonial county of the East Riding of Yorkshire. In the United Kingdom, the term listed building refers to a building or other structure officially designated as being of special architectural, historical or cultural significance; Grade I structures are those considered to be "buildings of exceptional interest". In England, the authority for listing under the Planning (Listed Buildings and Conservation Areas) Act 1990 rests with Historic England, a non-departmental public body sponsored by the Department for Culture, Media and Sport.

== City of Kingston upon Hull ==
Name	Location	Type	Completed (Note: The date given is the date used by Historic England as significant for the initial building or that of an important part in the structure's description.)	Date designated	Grid ref. (Note: The grid reference is based on the British national grid reference system, sometimes known as OSGB36, used by the Ordnance Survey.) Geo-coordinates	Entry number (Note: The "List Entry Number" is a unique number assigned to each listed building and scheduled monument by Historic England.)	Image
Church of St James and Boundary Wall	Sutton, City of Kingston upon Hull	Gate Pier	c. 1347	13 October 1952	TA1181032950; 53°46′51″N 0°18′17″W	1293238	Church of St James and Boundary Wall More images
Hull Charterhouse and Attached Boundary Wall and Railings	City of Kingston upon Hull	Gate	1778–80	13 October 1952	TA1004229353; 53°44′56″N 0°19′58″W	1208200	Hull Charterhouse and Attached Boundary Wall and Railings More images
Hull Trinity House	City of Kingston upon Hull	House	Late 18th century	13 October 1952	TA0988628600; 53°44′32″N 0°20′07″W	1219563	Hull Trinity House More images
Maisters House	City of Kingston upon Hull	House	1743–44	13 October 1952	TA1017228750; 53°44′37″N 0°19′51″W	1283090	Maisters House More images
Hull Minster	City of Kingston upon Hull	Gate	Late 20th century	13 October 1952	TA0994828535; 53°44′30″N 0°20′04″W	1292280	Hull Minster More images
Church of St Charles Borromeo and Adjoining Presbytery	City of Kingston upon Hull	Priests House	1829	4 March 2015	TA0963229094; 53°44′48″N 0°20′21″W	1197723	Church of St Charles Borromeo and Adjoining Presbytery More images
Statue of King William III and Flanking Lamps	City of Kingston upon Hull	Statue	1734	13 October 1952	TA1000528476; 53°44′28″N 0°20′01″W	1197697	Statue of King William III and Flanking Lamps More images
Wilberforce House Museum and Attached Garden Wall	City of Kingston upon Hull	House	c. 1590	13 October 1952	TA1024928822; 53°44′39″N 0°19′47″W	1209831	Wilberforce House Museum and Attached Garden Wall More images

== East Riding of Yorkshire ==
Name	Location	Type	Completed	Date designated	Grid ref. Geo-coordinates	Entry number	Image
Church of St Andrew	Bainton, East Riding of Yorkshire	Church	c. 1280	20 September 1966	SE9651652361; 53°57′30″N 0°31′50″W	1083830	Church of St Andrew More images
Church of All Saints	Barmston, East Riding of Yorkshire	Cross	12th century	30 June 1966	TA1565258854; 54°00′46″N 0°14′12″W	1083851	Church of All Saints More images
Beverley North Bar Nos 65 and 67 (bar House) Including Garden Wall, Piers and Railings	Beverley, East Riding of Yorkshire	House	1409	1 March 1950	TA0299239871; 53°50′42″N 0°26′10″W	1162565	Beverley North Bar Nos 65 and 67 (bar House) Including Garden Wall, Piers and Railings More images
Gates, Gate Piers and Railings to Norwood House	Beverley, East Riding of Yorkshire	Gate	c. 1780	30 June 1987	TA0331739921; 53°50′43″N 0°25′52″W	1318235	Gates, Gate Piers and Railings to Norwood House
Norwood House	Beverley, East Riding of Yorkshire	House	c.1765–70	1 March 1950	TA0330639936; 53°50′43″N 0°25′53″W	1346387	Norwood House More images
The Guildhall	Beverley, East Riding of Yorkshire	Court Room	15th century	1 March 1950	TA0339439472; 53°50′28″N 0°25′48″W	1083960	The Guildhall More images
Lairgate Hall	Beverley, East Riding of Yorkshire	Merchants House	c. 1700	1 March 1950	TA0326239284; 53°50′22″N 0°25′56″W	1084022	Lairgate Hall More images
The Market Cross	Beverley, East Riding of Yorkshire	Market Cross	1714	1 March 1950	TA0322239669; 53°50′35″N 0°25′58″W	1346372	The Market Cross More images
The Minster Church of St John	Beverley, East Riding of Yorkshire	Treadwheel	pre 1225	1 March 1950	TA0375739261; 53°50′21″N 0°25′29″W	1084028	The Minster Church of St John More images
The Parish Church of St Mary	Beverley, East Riding of Yorkshire	Parish Church	12th century	1 March 1950	TA0315039805; 53°50′39″N 0°26′01″W	1162693	The Parish Church of St Mary More images
Church of St Edith	Bishop Wilton, East Riding of Yorkshire	Church	12th century	26 January 1967	SE7982355212; 53°59′12″N 0°47′03″W	1083868	Church of St Edith More images
Boynton Hall	Boynton, East Riding of Yorkshire	Country House	Late 16th century	11 January 1952	TA1378567806; 54°05′37″N 0°15′42″W	1083385	Boynton Hall More images
Church of St Andrew	Boynton, East Riding of Yorkshire	Church	15th century	30 June 1966	TA1366067975; 54°05′42″N 0°15′49″W	1083392	Church of St Andrew More images
Church of St Mary	Brandesburton, East Riding of Yorkshire	Church	12th century	16 December 1966	TA1194647645; 53°54′46″N 0°17′50″W	1263780	Church of St Mary More images
Parish Church of St Mary	Bridlington, East Riding of Yorkshire	Church	c. 1113	7 September 1951	TA1770167985; 54°05′40″N 0°12′06″W	1346530	Parish Church of St Mary More images
Sewerby House	Sewerby, East Riding of Yorkshire	House	c. 1714	7 September 1951	TA2034369061; 54°06′12″N 0°09′40″W	1367122	Sewerby House More images
The Bayle Gate	Bridlington, East Riding of Yorkshire	Augustinian Monastery	c. 1388	7 September 1951	TA1758667885; 54°05′36″N 0°12′13″W	1346512	The Bayle Gate More images
Church of All Saints	Bubwith, East Riding of Yorkshire	Church	Late 12th century	16 December 1960	SE7116736178; 53°49′01″N 0°55′14″W	1310699	Church of All Saints More images
Church of St Andrew	Bugthorpe, East Riding of Yorkshire	Church	12th century	26 January 1967	SE7724857878; 54°00′40″N 0°49′22″W	1309966	Church of St Andrew More images
Church of All Saints	Burstwick, East Riding of Yorkshire	Parish Church	13th century	16 December 1966	TA2276928032; 53°44′03″N 0°08′25″W	1366240	Church of All Saints More images
Burton Agnes Hall	Burton Agnes, East Riding of Yorkshire	Country House	1601–1610	11 January 1952	TA1029063273; 54°03′13″N 0°19′00″W	1346451	Burton Agnes Hall More images
Burton Agnes Manor House	Burton Agnes, East Riding of Yorkshire	Manor House	1170–5	17 July 1987	TA1025163251; 54°03′12″N 0°19′02″W	1280994	Burton Agnes Manor House More images
Church of St Martin	Burton Agnes, East Riding of Yorkshire	Church	11th century	30 June 1966	TA1020863256; 54°03′13″N 0°19′05″W	1083812	Church of St Martin More images
Gatehouse with Walls and Sets of Gate Piers Adjoining to Front of Burton Agnes Hall	Burton Agnes, East Riding of Yorkshire	Gate Pier	c. 1610	17 July 1987	TA1030763155; 54°03′09″N 0°19′00″W	1083815	Gatehouse with Walls and Sets of Gate Piers Adjoining to Front of Burton Agnes Hall More images
Remains of Treadmill and Bakery with Attached Wall at Burton Agnes Hall	Burton Agnes, East Riding of Yorkshire	Wall	c. 1600	17 July 1987	TA1024163260; 54°03′13″N 0°19′03″W	1346453	Upload Photo
Burton Constable Hall	Burton Constable, East Riding of Yorkshire	Country House	Late 16th century	4 March 1952	TA1887136784; 53°48′50″N 0°11′46″W	1083444	Burton Constable Hall More images
Stables and Carriage House Approximately 20 Metres to South-east of Burton Constable Hall	Burton Constable Park, Burton Constable, East Riding of Yorkshire	Courtyard	1760–1770	16 December 1966	TA1897836634; 53°48′45″N 0°11′40″W	1366245	Stables and Carriage House Approximately 20 Metres to South-east of Burton Constable Hall More images
Church of Saint Peter and Saint Paul	Burton Pidsea, East Riding of Yorkshire	Church	Early 13th century	16 December 1966	TA2519631102; 53°45′40″N 0°06′08″W	1083494	Church of Saint Peter and Saint Paul More images
Church of All Saints	Low Catton, East Riding of Yorkshire	Church	12th century	26 January 1967	SE7048053990; 53°58′38″N 0°55′37″W	1346407	Church of All Saints More images
Church of Saint Mary	Cottingham, East Riding of Yorkshire	Church	Early 14th century	31 January 1967	TA0475832937; 53°46′56″N 0°24′42″W	1103394	Church of Saint Mary More images
Church of Saint Mary	South Dalton, East Riding of Yorkshire	Church	1858–61	7 February 1968	SE9672445558; 53°53′50″N 0°31′46″W	1103439	Church of Saint Mary More images
Summer Pavilion to West of Dalton Hall	Dalton Holme, East Riding of Yorkshire	Pavilion	Before 1737	7 February 1968	SE9485544858; 53°53′28″N 0°33′29″W	1103438	Upload Photo
Church of All Saints	Driffield, East Riding of Yorkshire	Church	Pre-conquest	27 November 1963	TA0220657976; 54°00′28″N 0°26′31″W	1083378	Church of All Saints More images
Church of All Saints	Easington, East Riding of Yorkshire	Parish Church	12th century	16 December 1966	TA3989319170; 53°39′01″N 0°06′54″E	1346602	Church of All Saints More images
Church of St Michael	Garton, East Riding of Yorkshire	Church	Early 13th century	16 December 1966	TA2704535454; 53°48′00″N 0°04′21″W	1215863	Church of St Michael More images
Grimston Garth	Grimston, East Riding of Yorkshire	House	1781–6	16 December 1966	TA2828635100; 53°47′47″N 0°03′14″W	1215935	Grimston Garth More images
Church of St Michael	Eastrington, East Riding of Yorkshire	Church	11th century	16 December 1966	SE7964929978; 53°45′36″N 0°47′36″W	1031835	Church of St Michael More images
Church of All Saints	Aughton, East Riding of Yorkshire	Church	Late 12th century	16 December 1966	SE7016338650; 53°50′22″N 0°56′07″W	1346742	Church of All Saints More images
Chapel of the Virgin and Saint Everilda	Everingham Park, Everingham, East Riding of Yorkshire	Church	1836–39	26 January 1967	SE8057642153; 53°52′10″N 0°46′34″W	1346301	Chapel of the Virgin and Saint Everilda More images
Everingham Hall	Everingham Park, Everingham, East Riding of Yorkshire	House	1757–64	26 January 1967	SE8061242121; 53°52′09″N 0°46′32″W	1084130	Everingham Hall More images
Church of St Mary	Fridaythorpe, East Riding of Yorkshire	Church	12th century	20 September 1966	SE8747059263; 54°01′19″N 0°39′59″W	1346479	Church of St Mary More images
Church of St Michael	Garton on the Wolds, East Riding of Yorkshire	Church	c. 1132	20 September 1966	SE9819759328; 54°01′14″N 0°30′10″W	1160977	Church of St Michael More images
Church of All Hallows	Goodmanham, East Riding of Yorkshire	Church	7th century	4 March 1986	SE8898843143; 53°52′37″N 0°38′52″W	1084132	Church of All Hallows More images
Church of All Saints	Halsham, East Riding of Yorkshire	Parish Church	Early 12th century	16 December 1966	TA2681027742; 53°43′50″N 0°04′45″W	1160776	Church of All Saints More images
Church of Saint John of Beverley	Harpham, East Riding of Yorkshire	Church	12th century	20 September 1966	TA0922861583; 54°02′19″N 0°20′01″W	1083345	Church of Saint John of Beverley More images
Church of St. Martin	Hayton, East Riding of Yorkshire	Church	12th century	26 January 1967	SE8209146023; 53°54′14″N 0°45′07″W	1084144	Church of St. Martin More images
Church of St Augustine	Hedon, East Riding of Yorkshire	Parish Church	13th century	9 January 1954	TA1883128736; 53°44′29″N 0°11′59″W	1346568	Church of St Augustine More images
Church of All Saints	Hessle, East Riding of Yorkshire	Church	12th century	31 January 1967	TA0330326433; 53°43′27″N 0°26′09″W	1161766	Church of All Saints More images
Church of All Saints	Holme upon Spalding Moor, East Riding of Yorkshire	Church	13th century	16 December 1966	SE8209938940; 53°50′25″N 0°45′14″W	1025868	Church of All Saints More images
Church of Saint Nicholas	Hornsea, East Riding of Yorkshire	Church	13th century	22 April 1965	TA2009847639; 53°54′40″N 0°10′23″W	1249386	Church of Saint Nicholas More images
Minster Church of St Peter and St Paul and Chapter House	Howden, East Riding of Yorkshire	Tower	Late 14th century	16 December 1966	SE7480328251; 53°44′43″N 0°52′02″W	1160491	Minster Church of St Peter and St Paul and Chapter House More images
Church of St. Mary	Huggate, East Riding of Yorkshire	Church	12th century	26 January 1967	SE8823055510; 53°59′17″N 0°39′21″W	1084147	Church of St. Mary More images
Church of Saint Peter	Humbleton, East Riding of Yorkshire	Statue	1637	16 December 1966	TA2264034853; 53°47′44″N 0°08′23″W	1216050	Church of Saint Peter More images
Church of St Nicholas	Keyingham, East Riding of Yorkshire	Parish Church	12th–13th centuries	16 December 1966	TA2451825500; 53°42′40″N 0°06′54″W	1160841	Church of St Nicholas More images
Church of All Saints	Kilham, East Riding of Yorkshire	Church	12th century	20 September 1966	TA0642464407; 54°03′53″N 0°22′31″W	1309840	Church of All Saints More images
Church of All Saints	Kirby Underdale, East Riding of Yorkshire	Church	11th century	14 April 1987	SE8084258590; 54°01′01″N 0°46′04″W	1083837	Church of All Saints More images
Church of Saint Andrew	Kirk Ella, East Riding of Yorkshire	Church	Early 13th century	31 January 1967	TA0202729726; 53°45′14″N 0°27′15″W	1103401	Church of Saint Andrew More images
Church of St Mary	Kirkburn, East Riding of Yorkshire	Church	c. 1139	20 September 1966	SE9796755060; 53°58′56″N 0°30′27″W	1083797	Church of St Mary More images
Church of Saint Peter	Langtoft, East Riding of Yorkshire	Church	13th century	20 September 1966	TA0083067017; 54°05′21″N 0°27′36″W	1083356	Church of Saint Peter More images
Church of St. Catherine	Leconfield, East Riding of Yorkshire	Church	12th century or Earlier	7 February 1968	TA0151243749; 53°52′48″N 0°27′26″W	1103450	Church of St. Catherine More images
Church of St. Leonard	Scorborough, East Riding of Yorkshire	Church	1857–1859	7 February 1968	TA0157145329; 53°53′39″N 0°27′21″W	1103451	Church of St. Leonard More images
Church of St. Mary	Lockington, East Riding of Yorkshire	Church	12th century	7 February 1968	SE9971846855; 53°54′30″N 0°29′01″W	1310465	Church of St. Mary More images
Church of All Saints	Londesborough, East Riding of Yorkshire	Cross	11th century	26 January 1967	SE8686145384; 53°53′50″N 0°40′47″W	1084136	Church of All Saints More images
Gates, Gatepiers, Flanking Walls and Abutments	Londesborough Park, Londesborough, East Riding of Yorkshire	Gate	c.1660–70	26 January 1967	SE8662545227; 53°53′46″N 0°41′00″W	1310607	Gates, Gatepiers, Flanking Walls and Abutments More images
Church of All Saints	Market Weighton, East Riding of Yorkshire	Church	11th century	26 January 1967	SE8775941797; 53°51′54″N 0°40′01″W	1160460	Church of All Saints More images
Church of St Margaret	Millington, East Riding of Yorkshire	Church	12th century	26 January 1967	SE8302751862; 53°57′22″N 0°44′10″W	1161938	Church of St Margaret More images
Church of All Saints	Nafferton, East Riding of Yorkshire	Church	12th century	20 September 1966	TA0555659003; 54°00′59″N 0°23′26″W	1346661	Church of All Saints More images
Church of Saint Nicholas	North Newbald, East Riding of Yorkshire	Church	c. 1140	7 February 1968	SE9118536578; 53°49′03″N 0°36′59″W	1346990	Church of Saint Nicholas More images
Church of All Saints	North Cave, East Riding of Yorkshire	Church	Late 12th century	16 December 1966	SE8968332728; 53°46′59″N 0°38′25″W	1203419	Church of All Saints More images
Church of Saint James	Nunburnholme, East Riding of Yorkshire	Cross	c. 1000	26 January 1967	SE8477447791; 53°55′10″N 0°42′39″W	1309850	Church of Saint James More images
Church of St Wilfrid	Ottringham, East Riding of Yorkshire	Parish Church	12th century	16 December 1966	TA2678224427; 53°42′03″N 0°04′52″W	1160874	Church of St Wilfrid More images
Church of St Germain	Winestead, East Riding of Yorkshire	Parish Church	12th century	16 December 1966	TA2986823746; 53°41′38″N 0°02′05″W	1161091	Church of St Germain More images
Church of St Patrick	Patrington, East Riding of Yorkshire	Parish Church	First half of 14th century	16 December 1966	TA3155422541; 53°40′58″N 0°00′35″W	1083450	Church of St Patrick More images
Church of St Andrew	Paull, East Riding of Yorkshire	Parish Church	Mid 14th century–15th century	16 December 1966	TA1722825738; 53°42′54″N 0°13′31″W	1083434	Church of St Andrew More images
Paull Holme Tower	Paull Holme, Paull, East Riding of Yorkshire	Tower House	Mid–Late 15th century	21 May 1987	TA1852224881; 53°42′25″N 0°12′21″W	1366242	Paull Holme Tower More images
Church of All Saints	Pocklington, East Riding of Yorkshire	Church	12th century or earlier	26 January 1967	SE8023248974; 53°55′50″N 0°46′46″W	1162006	Church of All Saints More images
Church of All Saints	Preston, East Riding of Yorkshire	Parish Church	13th century	16 December 1966	TA1871330602; 53°45′30″N 0°12′03″W	1083438	Church of All Saints More images
Church of All Saints	Tunstall, East Riding of Yorkshire	Church	13th century	16 December 1966	TA3055231990; 53°46′04″N 0°01′15″W	1216255	Church of All Saints More images
Church of All Saints	Roos, East Riding of Yorkshire	Church	Pre 13th century	16 December 1966	TA2907129613; 53°44′49″N 0°02′39″W	1287781	Church of All Saints More images
Church of All Saints	Rudston, East Riding of Yorkshire	Church	12th century	30 June 1966	TA0978667731; 54°05′38″N 0°19′22″W	1162387	Church of All Saints More images
Dairy at Thorpe Hall	Rudston, East Riding of Yorkshire	Dairy	Early 19th century	30 June 1966	TA1085267699; 54°05′36″N 0°18′24″W	1083403	Upload Photo
Monolith Approximately 7 Metres North of Church of All Saints	Rudston, East Riding of Yorkshire	Standing Stone	Probably Bronze Age	30 June 1966	TA0980367743; 54°05′38″N 0°19′21″W	1083402	Monolith Approximately 7 Metres North of Church of All Saints More images
Houghton Hall	Sancton, East Riding of Yorkshire	House	c. 1760	18 January 1952	SE8883339145; 53°50′27″N 0°39′05″W	1160656	Houghton Hall More images
Church of All Saints	Shipton Thorpe, East Riding of Yorkshire	Church	12th century	26 January 1967	SE8523343158; 53°52′39″N 0°42′18″W	1310431	Church of All Saints More images
Church of St Helen	Skeffling, East Riding of Yorkshire	Parish Church	1460s	16 December 1966	TA3707719050; 53°39′00″N 0°04′21″E	1161165	Church of St Helen More images
Church of St Leonard	Skerne, East Riding of Yorkshire	Church	12th century	20 September 1966	TA0466155115; 53°58′53″N 0°24′20″W	1084138	Church of St Leonard More images
Church of All Saints	Skipsea, East Riding of Yorkshire	Boiler House	20th century	30 June 1966	TA1656054977; 53°58′40″N 0°13′27″W	1083824	Church of All Saints More images
Church of St Augustine	Skirlaugh, East Riding of Yorkshire	Church	c. 1401	16 December 1966	TA1417039705; 53°50′28″N 0°15′59″W	1161844	Church of St Augustine More images
Sledmere House	Sledmere, East Riding of Yorkshire	Country House	1751	7 September 1987	SE9308264669; 54°04′10″N 0°34′45″W	1083802	Sledmere House More images
Eleanor Cross	Sledmere, East Riding of Yorkshire	Memorial cross	1898	2 March 2016	SE9286364622; 54°04′09″N 0°34′57″W	1083806	Eleanor Cross More images
Wagoners' Memorial	Sledmere, East Riding of Yorkshire	Memorial	1920	18 March 2016	SE9289864690; 54°04′11″N 0°34′55″W	1161354	Wagoners' Memorial More images
Church of St Lawrence	Snaith, East Riding of Yorkshire	Parish Church	12th century	14 February 1967	SE6410022169; 53°41′31″N 1°01′51″W	1161899	Church of St Lawrence More images
Cowick Hall	East Cowick, East Riding of Yorkshire	Country House	1660–90	23 April 1952	SE6568021107; 53°40′56″N 1°00′25″W	1083323	Cowick Hall More images
Church of Saint Michael and All Angels	Sutton upon Derwent, East Riding of Yorkshire	Tower	15th century	26 January 1967	SE7058547308; 53°55′02″N 0°55′37″W	1162085	Church of Saint Michael and All Angels More images
Church of St Mary	Swine, East Riding of Yorkshire	Church	c. 1180	16 December 1966	TA1342535816; 53°48′23″N 0°16′45″W	1083427	Church of St Mary More images
Church of All Saints	Thwing, East Riding of Yorkshire	Church	12th century	30 June 1966	TA0490870212; 54°07′02″N 0°23′48″W	1083406	Church of All Saints More images
Church of All Saints	Adlingfleet, East Riding of Yorkshire	Parish Church	Mid 13th century	14 February 1967	SE8439521003; 53°40′43″N 0°43′26″W	1083144	Church of All Saints More images
Church of St Mary Magdalene	Whitgift, East Riding of Yorkshire	Parish Church	12th century	14 February 1967	SE8086722699; 53°41′40″N 0°46′36″W	1083151	Church of St Mary Magdalene More images
Church of St Mary	Watton, East Riding of Yorkshire	Church	15th century	20 September 1966	TA0219749732; 53°56′01″N 0°26′42″W	1083772	Church of St Mary More images
Watton Abbey	Watton, East Riding of Yorkshire	House	19th century	12 February 1952	TA0234449798; 53°56′03″N 0°26′33″W	1161550	Watton Abbey More images
Church of St Peter	Wawne, East Riding of Yorkshire	Church	12th century or Earlier	7 February 1968	TA0911736819; 53°48′58″N 0°20′39″W	1103427	Church of St Peter More images
Church of St Mary	Welwick, East Riding of Yorkshire	Parish Church	Late 13th century	16 December 1966	TA3415621115; 53°40′09″N 0°01′45″E	1366256	Church of St Mary More images
Church of St John the Baptist	Wilberfoss, East Riding of Yorkshire	Tower	19th century	26 January 1967	SE7327250995; 53°57′00″N 0°53′06″W	1162096	Church of St John the Baptist More images
Ruins of Wressle Castle	Wressle, East Riding of Yorkshire	Castle	c. 1380	16 December 1966	SE7066031547; 53°46′32″N 0°55′45″W	1083170	Ruins of Wressle Castle More images
Humber Bridge	Hessle	Suspension bridge	1981	12 July 2017	TA0241224487; 53°42′24″N 0°27′00″W	1447321	Humber Bridge More images

== See also ==
- Category:Grade I listed buildings in the East Riding of Yorkshire
- Grade I listed churches in the East Riding of Yorkshire
