= Scorborough Hall =

House in the East Riding of Yorkshire, England

Coordinates: 53.8934°N 0.4545°W

Scorborough Hall is a historic building in Scorborough, a hamlet in the East Riding of Yorkshire, in England.

A manor house was constructed in Scorborough in the mediaeval period, surrounded by a moat. It was owned by the Hotham family, who rebuilt the house in the early 17th century, a large building with 24 hearths. The house burned down in 1705 or 1706 and the family moved to Dalton Hall, constructing a new farmhouse on the Scorborough site, perhaps incorporating fragments of the old house. The building was extended later in the century, and again in 1848–1849 by George Fowler Jones. It was grade II listed in 1987, while the moated site on which it stands is a scheduled monument.

The house is built of red brick, with stone dressings, and a double-span roof of slate and pantile with coped gables on shaped kneelers. The main range has one storey and attics, and 3½ bays, and the extension to the rear has two storeys and three bays. The doorway has pilasters, a fanlight and a hood on shaped brackets, and there is a garden door on the extreme left. On the front are three canted bay windows with sashes under low pedimented gables. Above are five pedimented roof dormers.

== See also ==
- Listed buildings in Leconfield
