= Paull Holme Tower =

Fortified tower in Yorkshire, England

- East Riding of Yorkshire, England grid reference TA185248
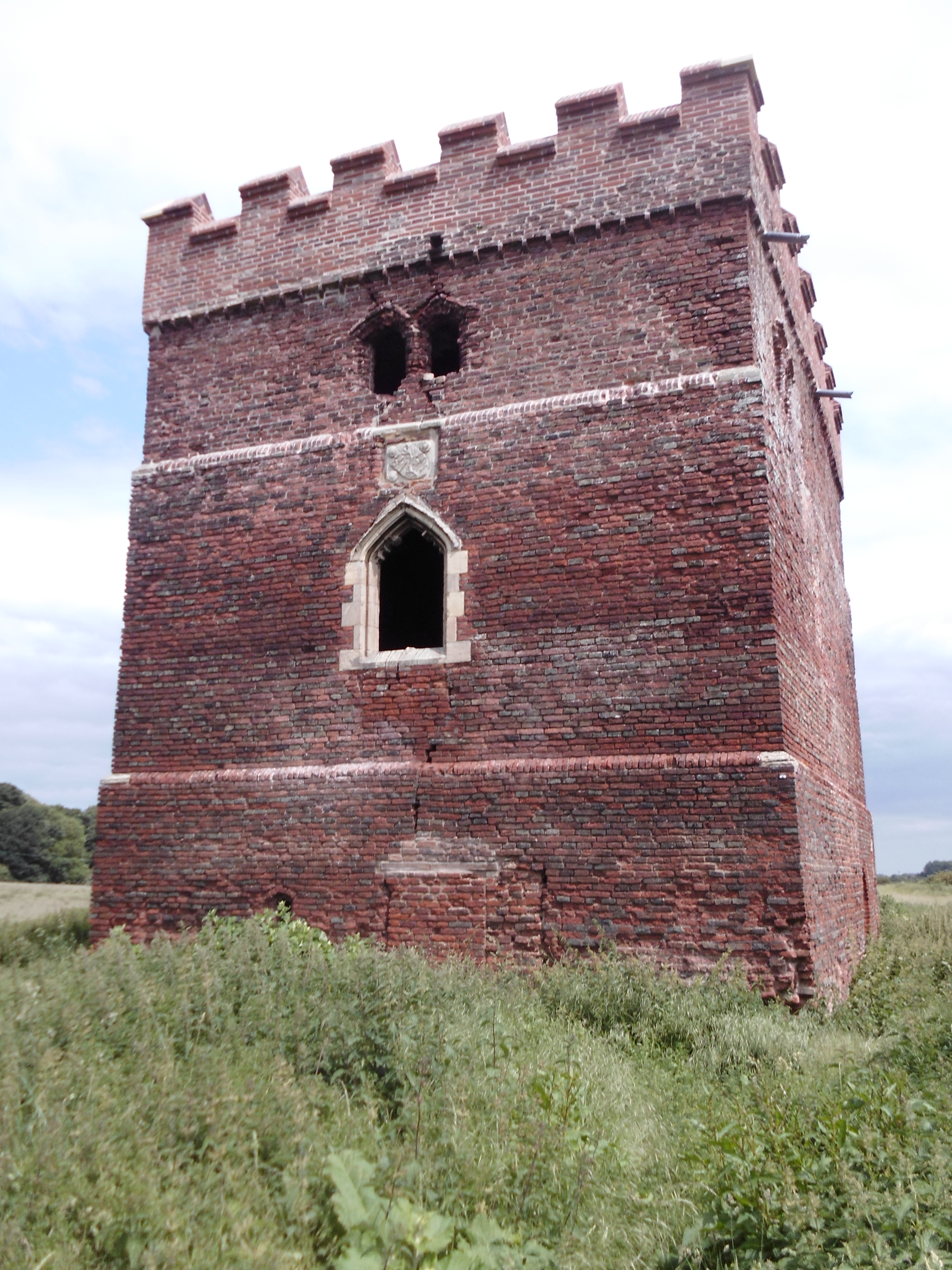
- The partially restored tower in June 2018

Site information
- Type: Tower
- Owner: Simon Taylor
- Open to the public: No
- Condition: Ruined

Location
- Shown within the East Riding of Yorkshire
- Location within East Riding of Yorkshire
- Coordinates: 53.7069°N 0.2059°W

Site history
- Materials: Brick

Paull Holme Tower is an unusual late-medieval fortified tower in the East Riding of Yorkshire, England.

== History ==
The tower is part of a rectangular, moated enclosure near the village of Paull, dating from the beginning of the 15th century. The tower is three storeys high, each floor having a single chamber, the whole protected by a portcullis entrance. There has been debate as to the purpose of the site – in part the fortification resembles the more northern pele towers, although alternatively the tower may have been built to give luxury accommodation overlooking the Humber estuary which flows nearby, similar to some properties built near King's Lynn. It is a unique building for the period and region.

The tower was restored in 1871, from which the current windows, doorways and plasterwork dates, but has been roofless since the early 20th century and as of 2010 is ruined and in what English Heritage considers to be a very bad condition. It is a scheduled monument and a Grade I listed building.

In December 2016 a grant of £160,000 was secured from Historic England to enable restoration work to begin with an aim of completing the work by September 2017.

A shield of arms is displayed on the outer wall.

Coat of arms of Paull Holme Tower
Notes Displayed surrounded by roses, most likely Tudor Escutcheon Quarterly, First and fourth: Barry of six Or and Azure on a canton Argent a chaplet Gules (Holme); Second and third: Sable a lion rampant Argent (Wastney).

== See also ==
- Castles in Great Britain and Ireland
- List of castles in England
- Grade I listed buildings in the East Riding of Yorkshire
- Listed buildings in Paull
