= St Catherine's Church, Leconfield =

Church in Leconfield, East Riding of Yorkshire, England

Coordinates: 53°52′48″N 0°27′26″W

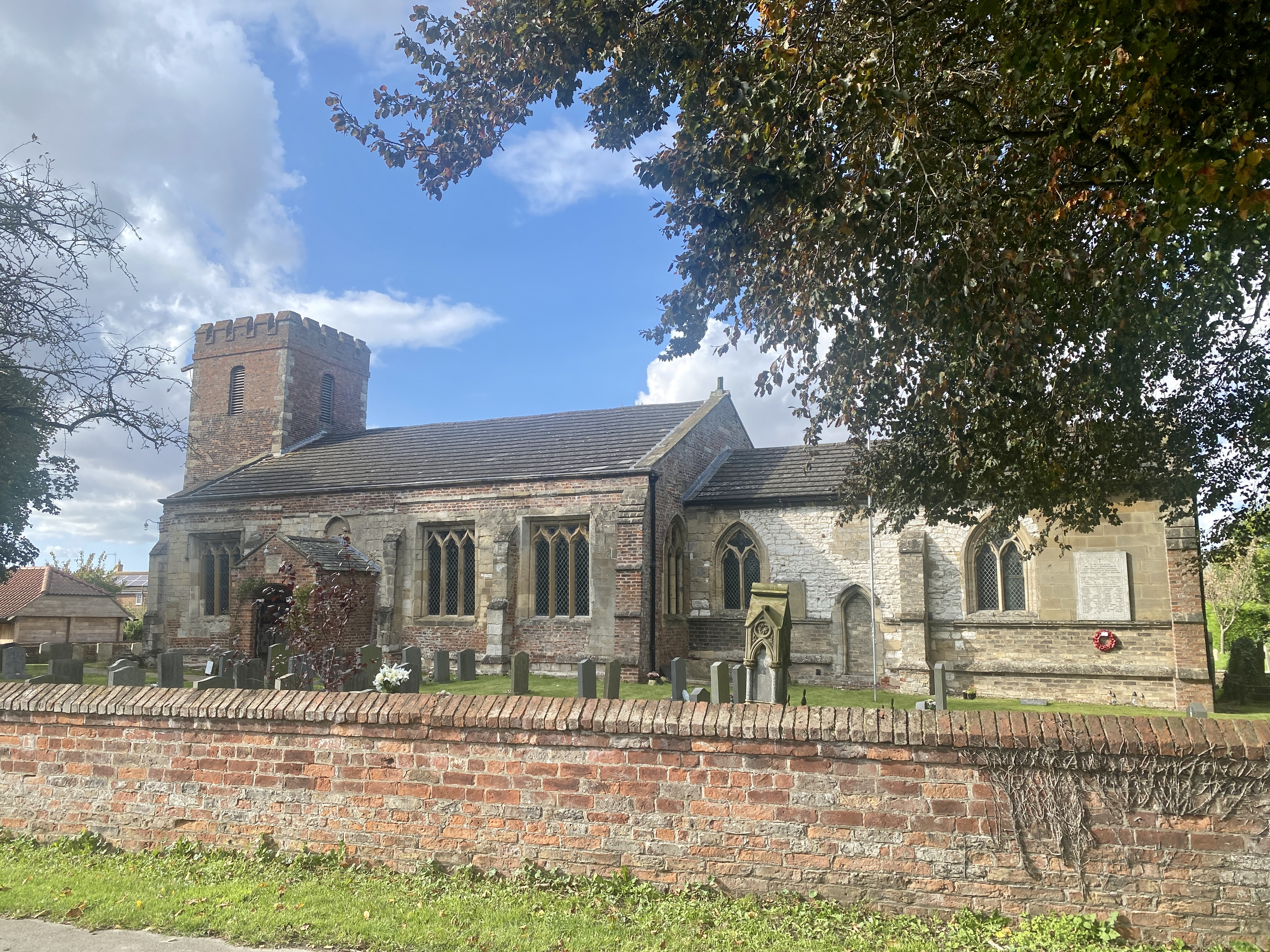
The church, in 2023

St Catherine's Church is the parish church of Leconfield, a village in the East Riding of Yorkshire, in England.

There was a church in Leconfield in the Saxon period, of which one window survives. Most of the nave was rebuilt in or before the 12th century. Aisles were added to the nave in the early 13th century, while the chancel was rebuilt later in the century. In the 14th century, the aisles were heightened. A tower was built in the 17th century, and a porch was added in 1684. The church was grade I listed in 1968.

The church is built of limestone, chalk, and brick of various colours, and has tile roofs. It consists of a nave, north and south aisles, a south porch, a chancel, and a west tower. The tower has one continuous stage, a moulded plinth, quoins, segmental-headed louvred bell openings, a band and an embattled parapet. Inside, there is an early-17th century pulpit supported by an octagonal pier, and there are small pieces of 14th- or 15th-century stained glass in some windows.

== See also ==
- Grade I listed buildings in the East Riding of Yorkshire
- Listed buildings in Leconfield
