= Burnby =

Village in the East Riding of Yorkshire, England

Coordinates: 53°54′26″N 0°43′41″W

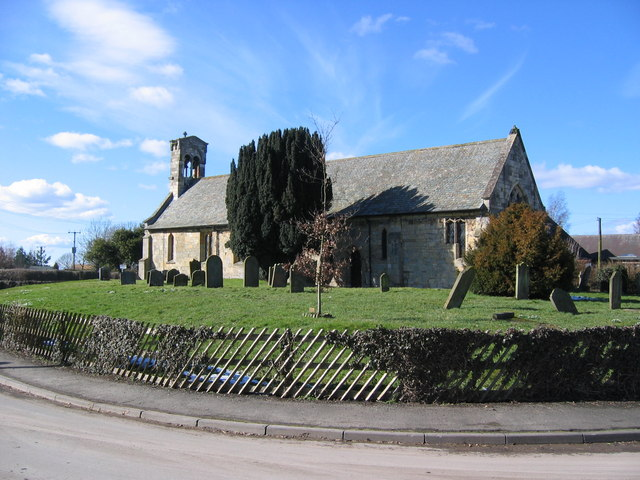
- St Giles’ Church, Burnby

- Location within the East Riding of Yorkshire
- OS grid reference: SE836464
  - London: 165 mi (266 km) S
- Civil parish: Hayton
- Unitary authority: East Riding of Yorkshire
- Ceremonial county: East Riding of Yorkshire
- Region: Yorkshire and the Humber
- Country: England
- Sovereign state: United Kingdom
- Post town: YORK
- Postcode district: YO42
- Dialling code: 01759
- Police: Humberside
- Fire: Humberside
- Ambulance: Yorkshire
- UK Parliament: Bridlington and The Wolds

Burnby is a village and former civil parish, now in the parish of Hayton, in the East Riding of Yorkshire, England. It is situated approximately 2.5 miles (4 km) south-east of the market town of Pocklington and 4 miles (6.4 km) north-west of the market town of Market Weighton. It lies 1 mile (1.6 km) to the east of the A1079 road. In 1931 the parish had a population of 103. On 1 April 1935 the parish was abolished and merged with Hayton.

The name Burnby derives from the Old Norse brunnrbȳ meaning 'settlement by the spring'.

St Giles' Church, Burnby was designated a Grade II* listed building in 1967, and is now recorded in the National Heritage List for England, maintained by Historic England.

Burnby was served by Nunburnholme railway station on the York to Beverley Line between 1847 and 1951.

== See also ==
- Listed buildings in Hayton, East Riding of Yorkshire
