= All Saints' Church, Kirby Underdale =

Church in Kirby Underdale, East Riding of Yorkshire, England

Coordinates: 54°01′01″N 0°46′04″W

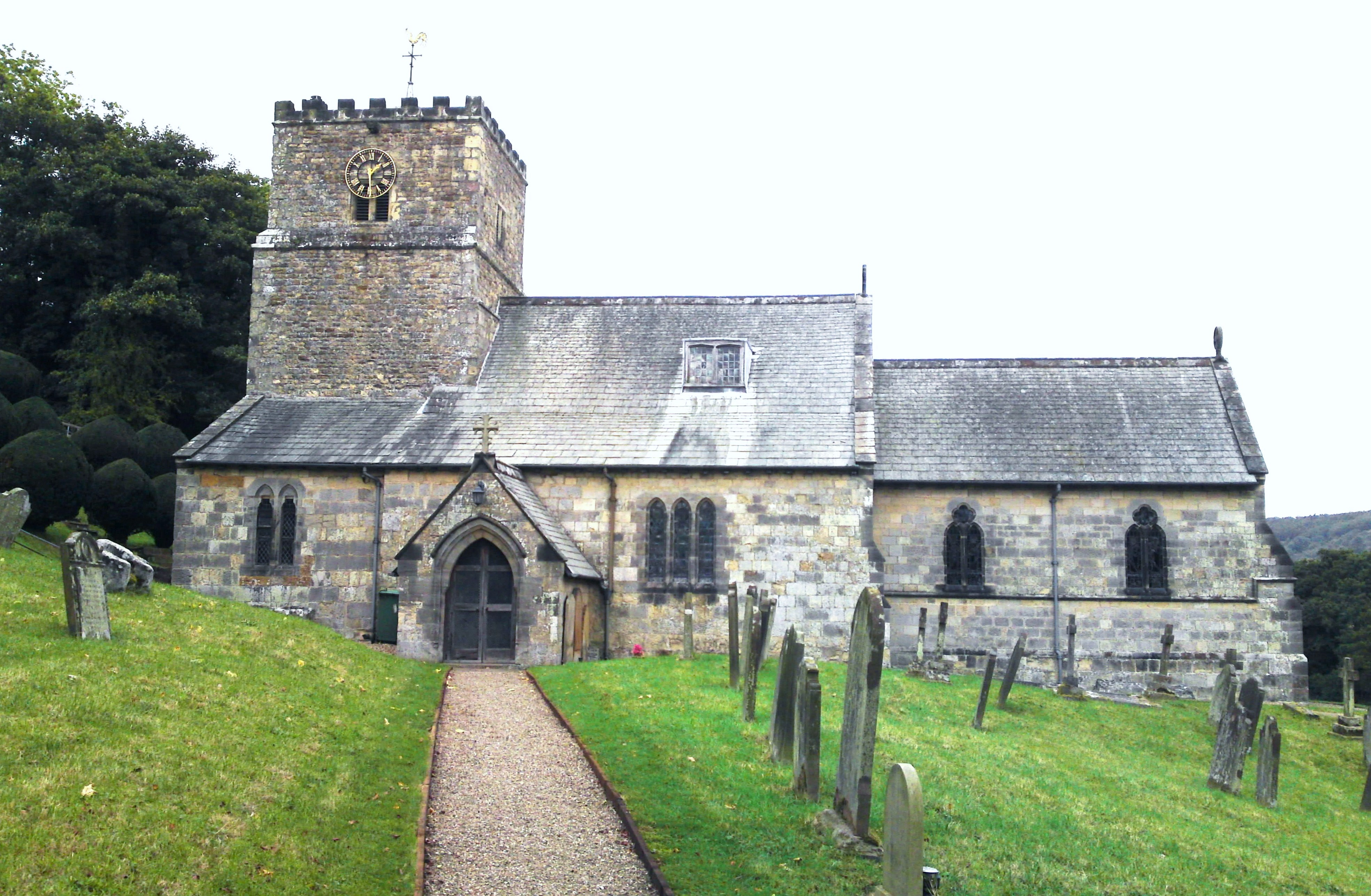
The building, in 2011

All Saints' Church is the parish church of Kirby Underdale, a village in the East Riding of Yorkshire, in England.

The church was built in the 11th century, from which period the nave and tower survive. Arcades were added in the mid 12th century. The building was restored in 1828, and then from 1870 to 1871 by George Edmund Street, who rebuilt the chancel and porch. The building was grade I listed in 1987.

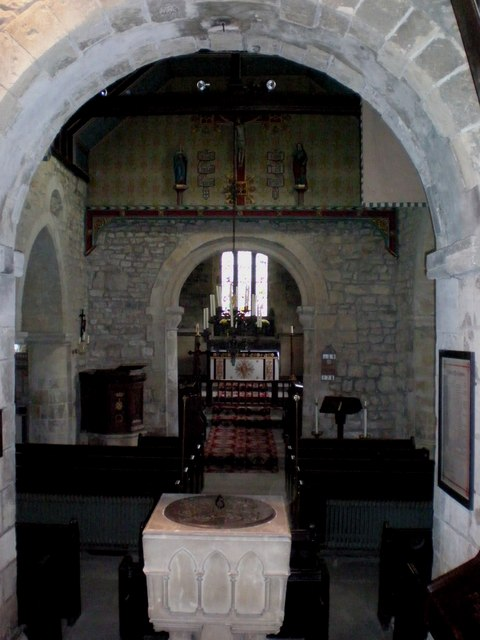
Interior, looking east

The church is built of stone with slate roofs, and consists of a nave with north and south aisles, a south porch, a chancel with a north vestry, and a west tower. The tower has two stages, a Norman west doorway with two orders on nook shafts with scallop capitals, above which is a small oblong window, bell openings with two square-headed mullioned lights, and an embattled parapet. Inside, there is a Roman carving of Mercury in the wall of the nave, faint remains of mediaeval wall paintings, and a memorial to Roger Wilberfoss, who died in 1532.

== See also ==
- Grade I listed buildings in the East Riding of Yorkshire
- Listed buildings in Kirby Underdale
