= Uncleby =

Hamlet in the East Riding of Yorkshire, England

Coordinates: 54.021748°N 0.762094°W

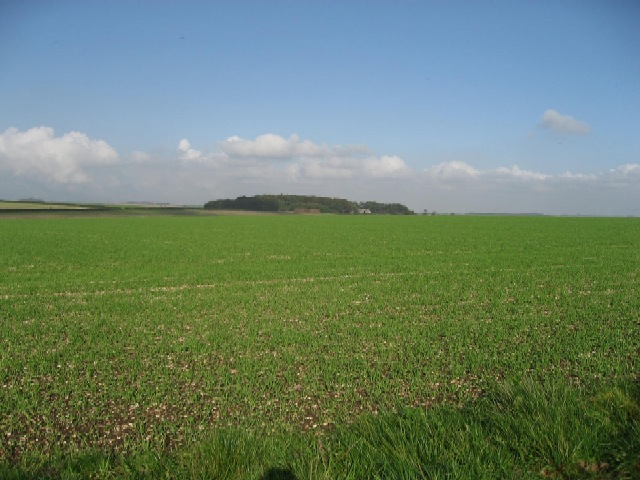
- Uncleby Wold, east of Uncleby

- Location within the East Riding of Yorkshire
- OS grid reference: SE812591
- Civil parish: Kirby Underdale
- Unitary authority: East Riding of Yorkshire
- Ceremonial county: East Riding of Yorkshire
- Region: Yorkshire and the Humber
- Country: England
- Sovereign state: United Kingdom
- Post town: YORK
- Postcode district: YO41
- Dialling code: 01759
- Police: Humberside
- Fire: Humberside
- Ambulance: Yorkshire
- UK Parliament: Bridlington and The Wolds

Uncleby is a hamlet in the East Riding of Yorkshire, England. It forms part of the civil parish of Kirby Underdale. It is situated approximately 6.5 miles (10.5 km) north of Pocklington.

== History ==
Uncleby is the site of an Anglian cemetery. 76 inhumation burials were excavated by Canon William Greenwell in 1868. These graves date from the 7th and 8th centuries AD. The objects from these excavations are held in the Yorkshire Museum and the British Museum.

== See also ==
- Listed buildings in Kirby Underdale
