= St Andrew's Church, Paull =

Church in Paull, East Riding of Yorkshire, England, UK

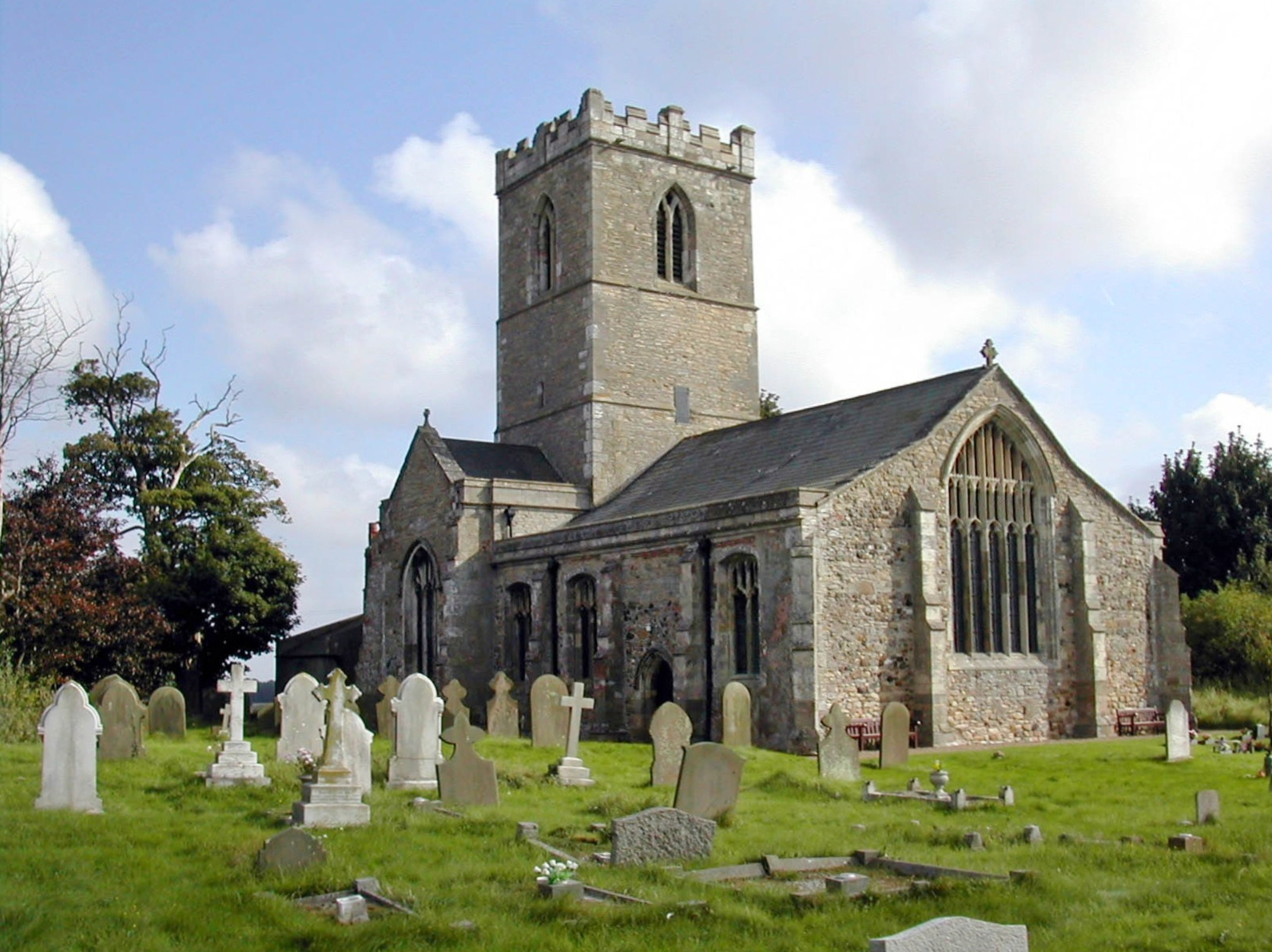
The church, in 2008

St Andrew's Church is the parish church of Paull, a village in the East Riding of Yorkshire, in England.

== History ==
The early history of churches at Paull is uncertain. Smith (2011) states there has been a church at Paull from 1115 AD. Incumbents of the parish of Paull (and Thorngumbald) are recorded as far back as 1295, and burials are recorded to 1347. The present church was built c. 1355, replacing a church on the banks of the Humber which was in a ruinous state, and subject to floods. It may incorporate some material from the demolished building. Initially dedicated to St Mary from the 15th century it was also dedicated to St Andrew.

The church was burnt during the English Civil War at the same time the fort at Paull was attacked (11 October 1642). It was repaired in 1663, and again c. 1700.

In 1841, the church was described consisting of a tower, nave, chancel and north and south transepts, built of stone plus cobbles, with some brick repair work. The tower had a three staged battlemented tower, with pointed windows in the upper (belfry) stage; the nave had two curved and one square headed window on the south side, similar on the north side with three windows and a door; each transept had a large pointed window, Perpendicular in style; the chancel had two windows with a small central door divided by wall buttresses in the south side, and similar buttressing on the north side, but with a window blocked off and a vestry. The buttressing was a mixture of normal, diagonal, and corner buttressing, most of three stages (five at the transepts), with mostly angled buttresses at corners, excluding the west ends of the transepts (single corner), and east end of the chancel (doubled corner). The interior included three sets of octagonal piers in the nave, separating the aisles.

The church was restored in 1879, and again c. 1890. The building was grade I listed in 1966.

== Architecture ==
The church is built of cobbles, limestone and brick, partly rendered, with slate roofs. It has a cruciform plan, consisting of a nave, north and south aisles, north and south transepts, a chancel with a north vestry, and a tower at the crossing. The tower has three stages, quoins, moulded string courses, a west doorway, slit windows, pointed two-light bell openings, and a coped embattled parapet.

Inside, both the north and south transepts have a piscina, and there is a damaged stone lectern. The floors are tiled, and there are traces of red paint, perhaps dating from the 17th century. The 19th-century font is octagonal. The east window has some fragments of mediaeval stained glass. There are numerous monuments dating from the 15th to the 19th century.

== See also ==
- Grade I listed buildings in the East Riding of Yorkshire
- Listed buildings in Paull
