= All Saints' Church, Driffield =

Church in Driffield, East Riding of Yorkshire, England

Coordinates: 54°00′28″N 0°26′31″W

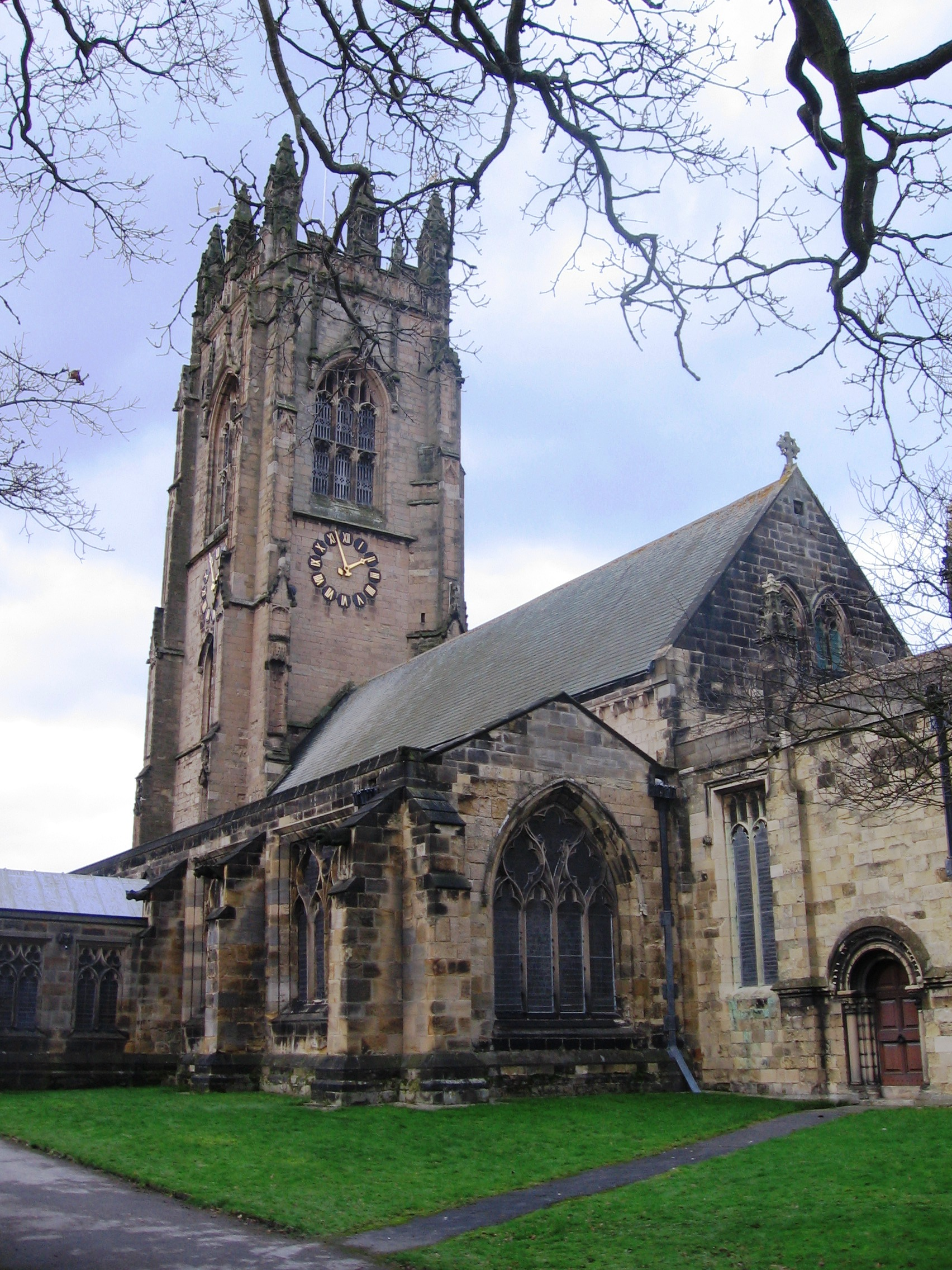
The church, in 2009

All Saints' Church is the parish church of Driffield, a town in the East Riding of Yorkshire, in England.

There was a church in Driffield before the Norman Conquest, and some large stones from it appear to be built into the tower. The earliest substantial parts of the current building are the 12th-century nave and clerestory. Aisles and a chancel were built early in the 13th century, and a tower in the 15th century. The church was altered by George Gilbert Scott Jr. between 1878 and 1880, the work including rebuilding the north aisle and adding a north chapel. The building was grade I listed in 1963.

The church is built in stone, with roofs of slate and lead, and consists of a nave with a clerestory, north and south aisles, a south porch, a chancel with a north chapel, and a west tower. The tower has three stages, a moulded plinth, string courses, angle buttresses, a south pointed window with a hood mould, clock faces, three-light bell openings with hood moulds and crocketed ogee gablets, and an embattled parapet with eight crocketed pinnacles. The south doorway dates from the early 13th century and has three orders, with colonnettes and mouldings, and the clerestory windows are round-headed and date from the 12th century. Inside, the cylindrical font dates from about 1180, there is a 14th-century piscina, and a selection of 12th-century fragments found during the Victorian restoration.

== See also ==
- Grade I listed buildings in the East Riding of Yorkshire
- Listed buildings in Driffield
