= Listed buildings in Hayton, East Riding of Yorkshire =

Hayton is a civil parish in the county of the East Riding of Yorkshire, England. It contains four listed buildings that are recorded in the National Heritage List for England. Of these, one is listed at Grade I, the highest of the three grades, one is at Grade II*, the middle grade, and the others are at Grade II, the lowest grade. The parish contains the villages of Hayton and Burnby and the surrounding area. The listed buildings consist of two churches, a rectory, and a school later used as a village hall.

== Key ==
Grade	Criteria
I	Buildings of exceptional interest, sometimes considered to be internationally important
II*	Particularly important buildings of more than special interest
II	Buildings of national importance and special interest

== Buildings ==
Name and location	Photograph	Date	Notes	Grade
St Martin's Church; 53.90388°N 0.75204°W		12th century	The church has been altered and extended through the centuries. It is built in stone, with roofs of slate and tile, and consists of a nave, a north aisle, a chancel with a north chapel, and a west tower. The tower has three stages, a moulded plinth, string courses, and a two-light pointed west window. The middle stage has two-light pointed windows, and above are lancet windows, and a pierced embattled parapet with eight pinnacles. The round-arched south doorway is Norman, with two orders. Inside, there are many remaining Norman features.	I
St Giles' Church, Burnby; 53.90684°N 0.72950°W		Late 12th century	The church has been altered and extended through the centuries, including rebuilding of the west end in 1840, and a restoration in 1908. It is built in stone with brick patching, it has a slate roof, and consists of a nave and a chancel. On the west end is a bellcote with a double bell opening and a mid-wall shaft under the tympanum. The ornate west door dates from the 19th century and is in Romanesque style.	II*
The Old Rectory; 53.90714°N 0.72871°W		Late 1760s	The house was remodelled and extended to rear in 1840. It is in whitewashed brick, with a floor band, and a hipped slate roof. There are two storeys and five bays. The windows are sashes, and the entrance is on the side.	II
Old Village School; 53.90298°N 0.75127°W		1854	The school, later converted into the village hall, is in brick, with stone dressings and a Welsh slate roof. There is a single storey and three bays. On the right bay of the front and on the right return is a gabled porch. The porch on the front has decorative bargeboards, and a four-centred arched entrance, above which is shield-shaped foundation board with an inscription and the date, and the porch is flanked by iron boot scrapers. The left two bays have cross-mullioned windows with diamond leaded lights.	II
