= Listed buildings in Leconfield =

Leconfield is a civil parish in the county of the East Riding of Yorkshire, England. It contains ten listed buildings that are recorded in the National Heritage List for England. Of these, two are listed at Grade I, the highest of the three grades, and the others are at Grade II, the lowest grade. The parish contains the village of Leconfield and the hamlet of Scorborough, and the surrounding countryside. Most of the listed buildings consist of houses and farmhouses, and the others are two churches and two bridges.

== Key ==
Grade	Criteria
I	Buildings of exceptional interest, sometimes considered to be internationally important
II	Buildings of national importance and special interest

== Buildings ==
Name and location	Photograph	Date	Notes	Grade
St Catherine's Church; 53.88005°N 0.45729°W		12th century or earlier	The church has been altered and extended through the centuries. It is built in limestone, chalk, and brick of various colours, and has tile roofs. The church consists of a nave, north and south aisles, a south porch, a chancel, and a west tower. The tower has one continuous stage, a moulded plinth, quoins, segmental-headed louvred bell openings, a band and an embattled parapet.	I
White House Farm; 53.89572°N 0.45968°W		Early 18th century	The house is in colourwashed brick, with a stepped brick eaves cornice, and a pantile roof with tumbled-in brick to the raised gables. There is one storey and attics, an L-shaped plan, three bays, and an outshut. The doorway has a rectangular fanlight, the windows are sashes, and above are three gabled roof dormers.	II
Cowthorpe; 53.88026°N 0.45612°W		Early to mid-18th century	The house is in red brick, with a dentiled eaves cornice, and a pantile roof, hipped on the right and with a raised gable on the left. There are two storeys, an L-shaped plan, and a front of three bays. The central doorway has a boarded fanlight with a raised head, the windows are sashes, and all the openings have cambered wedge lintels.	II
1 Arram Road; 53.87787°N 0.45813°W		Late 18th century	The house is in orange brick, with a dentilled brick eaves cornice, and a pantile roof, hipped on the left and with tumbled-in brick to the raised gable on the right. There are two storeys and three bays. The central doorway has pilasters, a decorative fanlight, and a projecting cornice on fluted brackets. The windows are sashes under cambered gauged brick arches.	II
Scorborough Hall; 53.89347°N 0.45450°W	—	Late 18th century	The house on a moated site, which was enlarged in 1848–49 by G. Fowler Jones, is in red brick, with stone dressings, and a double-span roof of slate and pantile with coped gables on shaped kneelers. The main range has one storey and attics, and 3½ bays, and the extension to the rear has two storeys and three bays. The doorway has pilasters, a fanlight and a hood on shaped brackets, and there is a garden door on the extreme left. On the front are three canted bay windows with sashes under low pedimented gables. Above are five pedimented roof dormers.	II
Bridge over moat, Scorborough Hall; 53.89288°N 0.45518°W	—	Late 18th century	The bridge over the dry medieval moat is in red brick with stone dressings, and consists of a single round arch. It has a raised parapet containing reused stones, and curved splays.	II
The Manor House; 53.87967°N 0.45592°W		Late 18th century	The house is in red brick and stone, with a hipped pantile roof. There are two storeys and a basement, and five bays. Five stone steps over a brick arch with wrought iron ramped handrails incorporating boot-scrapers lead up to a doorway, with fluted pilasters, a fanlight with radial glazing in panelled reveals and a soffit, and an open dentilled pediment. The windows are sashes under segmental brick arches. At the rear is a semicircular stair turret, and a doorway with a moulded cornice on brackets, and above is a low coped parapet.	II
Bridge over drain, Arram Grange; 53.87708°N 0.40367°W		Early 19th century	The bridge over the Beverley and Barmston Drain, to the northeast of Arram Grange, is in red brick with stone dressings, and consists of a single segmental arch. The bridge has a keystone and a band, a coped parapet, and splayed ends with abutments.	II
Decoy Farmhouse; 53.90039°N 0.4241°W		c. 1830	The farmhouse is in brown brick, with a dentilled eaves cornice, and a slate roof with coped gables. There are two storeys and three bays. The central doorway has pilasters and a fanlight, and the windows are sashes under cambered gauged brick arches.	II
St Leonard's Church, Scorborough; 53.89424°N 0.45581°W		1857–59	The church was designed by J. L. Pearson, and is built in gritstone with a tile roof. It consists of a nave and a chancel in one unit, a south porch, a north vestry, and a west steeple. The steeple has a tower with two stages, a moulded plinth, pilaster buttresses, a band with blind quatrefoils under a decorated cornice, a clock carved from stone in relief, a two-light west window with a hood mould, and a small lancet window. Above these are two-light bell openings with gablets, hexagonal buttresses with pyramidal caps, and a broach spire with blank arcading, trefoil-headed openings and a cross finial.	I
