= Lairgate Hall =

Historic building in the East Riding of Yorkshire

Coordinates: 53.839°N 0.432°W

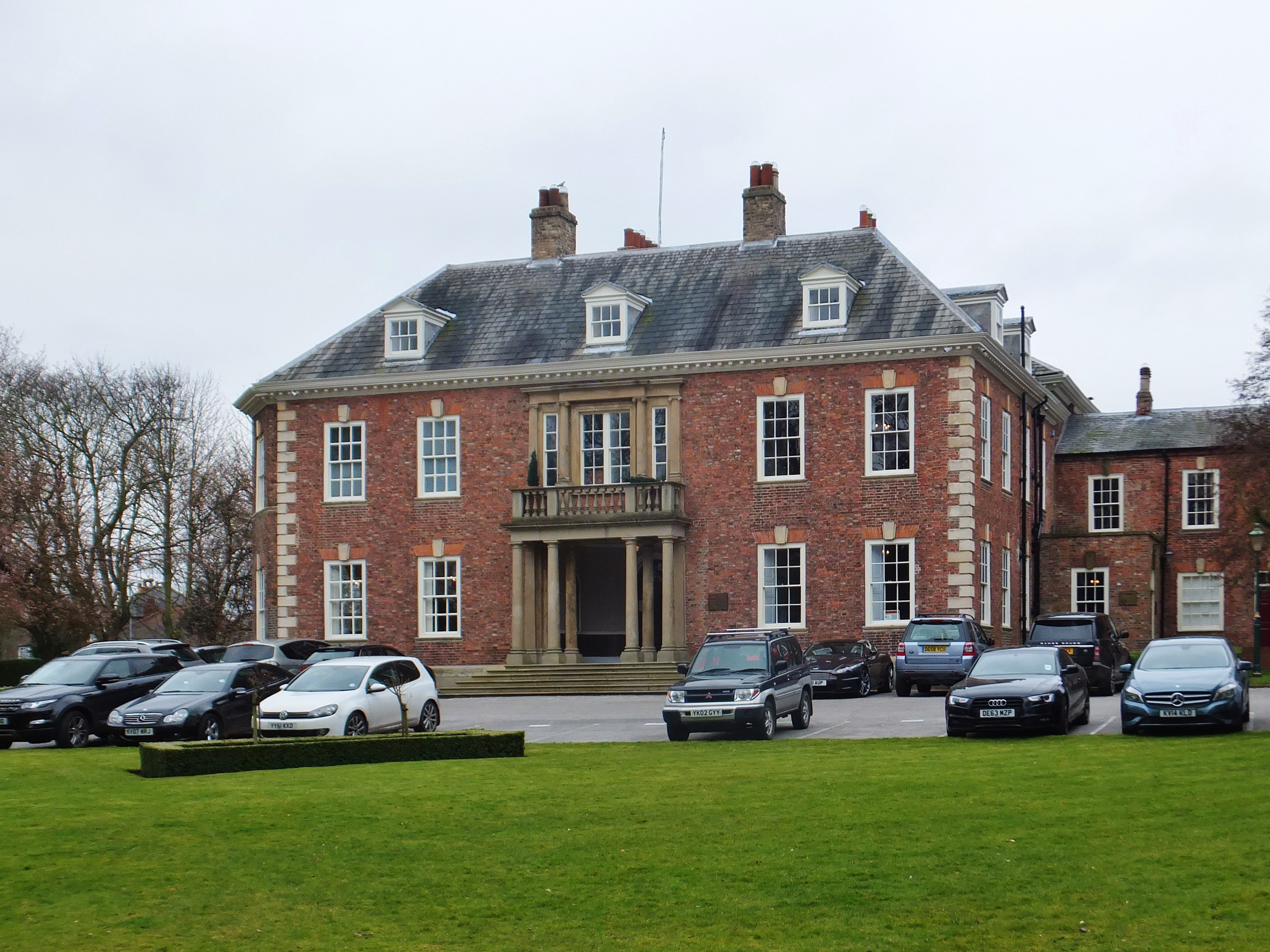
The building, in 2016

Lairgate Hall is a historic building in Beverley, a town in the East Riding of Yorkshire, in England.

The house was built around 1700 for the Pennyman family. Around 1780, it was extended to the west, and the centre of the entrance facade was reworked, all to designs by John Carr. In 1930, the house was purchased by the local council for use as offices, then from 1974 it was used by its successor, the East Yorkshire Borough of Beverley. After its abolition, in 1996, the building became an office complex. The building was grade I listed in 1950.

in red brick on a plinth, with stone dressings, rusticated quoins, a modillion cornice, and a hipped Westmorland slate roof. There are two storeys and attics, and an east front of five bays. In the centre, steps lead up to a tetrastyle Roman Doric portico in sandstone, and a doorway with a reeded architrave and a semicircular fanlight. Above the portico is a balustrade, and a tripartite window with an entablature and flanking attached Geek Ionic columns and pilasters. The outer bays contain sash windows with flat brick gauged heads and triple keystones, and moulded sills, and there are three pedimented roof dormers. The south front is flanked by two large semi-octagonal bays, each with three windows. Inside, there is a grand staircase dating from 1780 and extensive woodwork and plasterwork of high quality, with the dining and drawing rooms particularly noted.

== See also ==
- Grade I listed buildings in the East Riding of Yorkshire
- Listed buildings in Beverley (west and southwest areas)
