= St Leonard's Church, Scorborough =

Church in Scorborough, East Riding of Yorkshire, England

Coordinates: 53°53′39″N 0°27′21″W

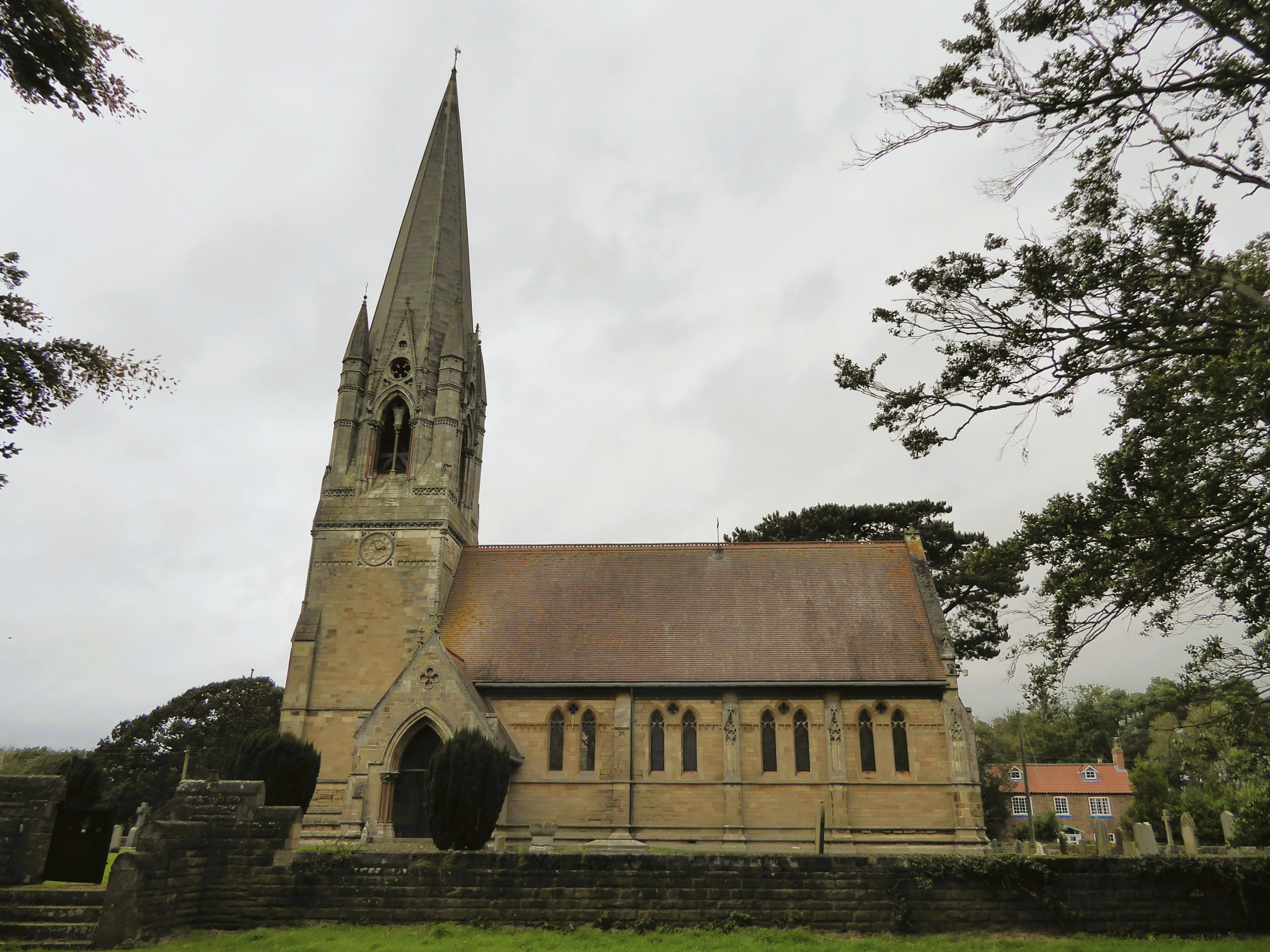
The church, in 2023

St Leonard's Church is an Anglican church in Scorborough, a hamlet in the East Riding of Yorkshire, in England.

The church was built between 1857 and 1859, to a Geometrical Gothic design by John Loughborough Pearson. It replaced a small brick church, and its construction was funded by Beaumont Hotham, 3rd Baron Hotham. Anthony Quiney considered it one of the greatest examples of Victorian church design in the country. The church was grade I listed in 1968.

The church is built of gritstone with a tile roof. It consists of a nave and a chancel in one unit, a south porch, a north vestry, and a west steeple. The steeple has a tower with two stages, a moulded plinth, pilaster buttresses, a band with blind quatrefoils under a decorated cornice, a clock carved from stone in relief, a two-light west window with a hood mould, and a small lancet window. Above these are two-light bell openings with gablets, hexagonal buttresses with pyramidal caps, and a broach spire with blank arcading, trefoil-headed openings and a cross finial. Inside, the windows and various other features have marble shafts. There is an early-16th century grave slab commemorating the priest Henry de Middleton.

== See also ==
- Grade I listed buildings in the East Riding of Yorkshire
- Listed buildings in Leconfield
