= St Peter's Church, Langtoft =

Church in Langtoft, East Riding of Yorkshire, England

Coordinates: 54°05′21″N 0°27′36″W

The church, in 2019

St Peter's Church is the parish church of Langtoft, East Riding of Yorkshire, a village in England.

The church was built in the 13th century, from which period the tower and south arcade of the nave survive. The chancel was added in the 14th century. Between 1900 and 1903, the church was restored and a north aisle was added. This work was designed by C. Hodgson Fowler, and it was the last church funded by Sir Tatton Sykes, 5th Baronet. The church was grade I listed in 1966.

View from the nave into the chancel

The church is built of stone, with lead roofs. It consists of a west tower, six-bay nave with a south porch, and two-bay chancel with a north vestry. The tower has three stages and is supported by buttresses. It has a lancet window at ground floor level, two pointed openings to the belfry, and a later parapet with a corbel table below. The nave also has buttresses and has a chamfered plinth. The windows are pointed and are largely 20th century, while the south doorway is 19th century. The chancel has a priest's door with a trefoil head under an ogee hood mould with a crocketed finial.

The font

Inside the church, there are three sedilia with trefoil heads and a similar piscina under an ogee-headed opening. There are two 12th-century items which were moved from Holy Trinity Church, Cottam before the mediaeval church there was demolished: a lintel and a font. The lintel is carved with the Lamb of God and vines. The tub font has carved panels depicting Adam and Eve, the martyring of Saint Andrew and Saint Lawrence, the Tree of Life, Margaret the Virgin and the dragon, and an unidentified beast.

== See also ==
- Grade I listed buildings in the East Riding of Yorkshire
