= St Mary's Church, Fridaythorpe =

Church in Fridaythorpe, East Riding of Yorkshire, England

Coordinates: 54°01′19″N 0°39′59″W

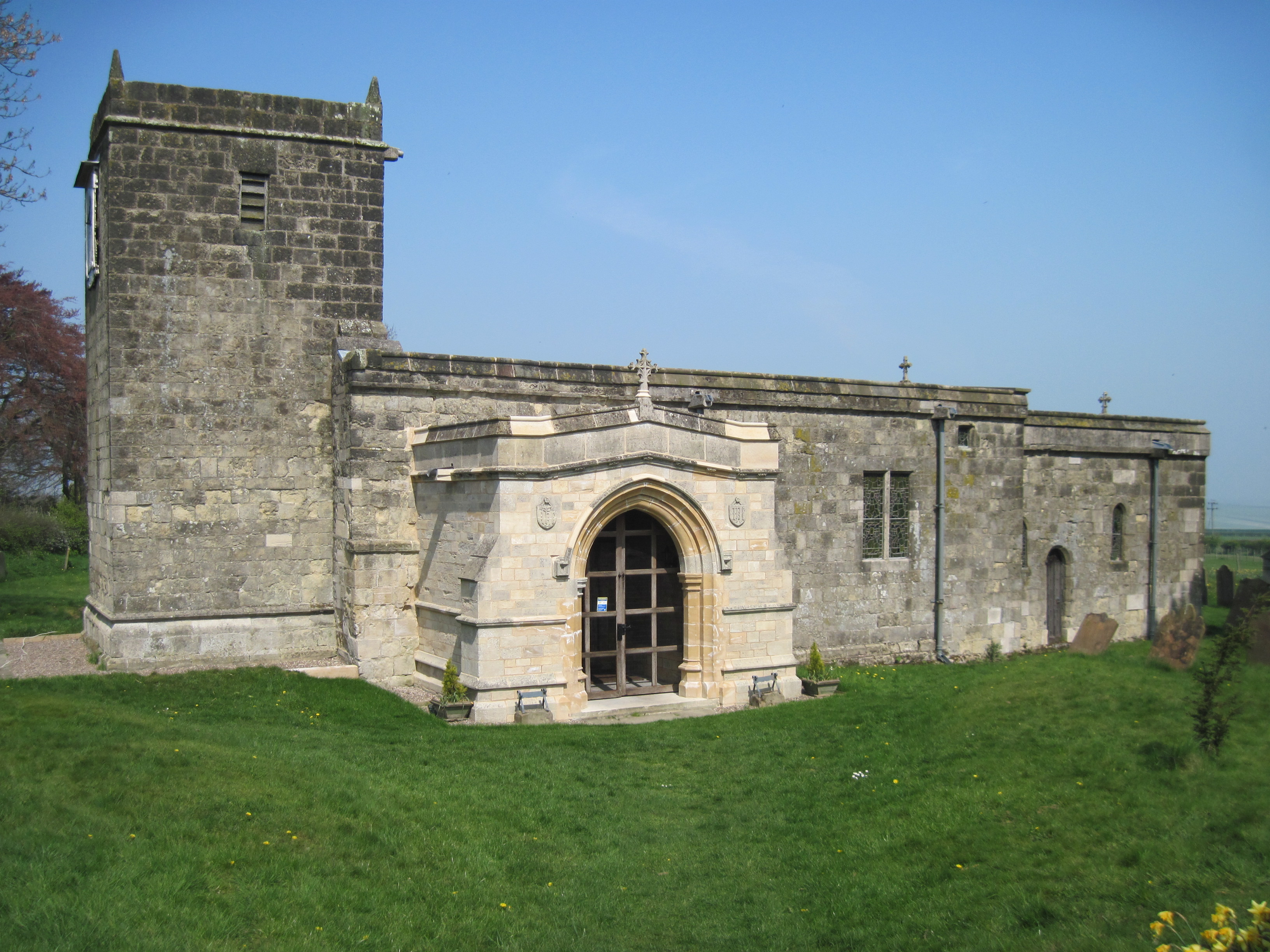
The church, in 2010

St Mary's Church is the parish church of Fridaythorpe, a village in the East Riding of Yorkshire, in England.

The church was built in the 12th century, with features including the door and chancel arch surviving from around 1140, while the tower was built around 1190. The north aisle was added in the 13th century, and the church was further extended in the 17th century and in 1771. Between 1902 and 1903, the church was restored by C. Hodgson Fowler, with funding from Tatton Sykes, which work including rebuilding the porch and north aisle. The church was grade I listed in 1966.

The church is built of limestone and consists of a three-bay nave with north aisle and clerestory and a south porch, a two-bay chancel with a north chapel, and a two-stage west tower. The tower has a low parapet with pyramidal finials in the corners, and a clock dating from 1903. The south doorway has a round arch with three orders of decoration and there are a variety of windows. Inside, there are early-17th century oak altar rails, a Norman font on an octagonal base, and parts of a mediaeval wall painting of the Ten Commandments. There is a grave slab of a priest, dating from around 1350, a bust of Tatton Sykes, carved by Bryan Charles, and an 18th-century altar brought from St Mary's Church, Sledmere.

== See also ==
- Grade I listed buildings in the East Riding of Yorkshire
