= St Martin's Church, Hayton =

Church in Hayton, East Riding of Yorkshire, England

Coordinates: 53°54′14″N 0°45′07″W

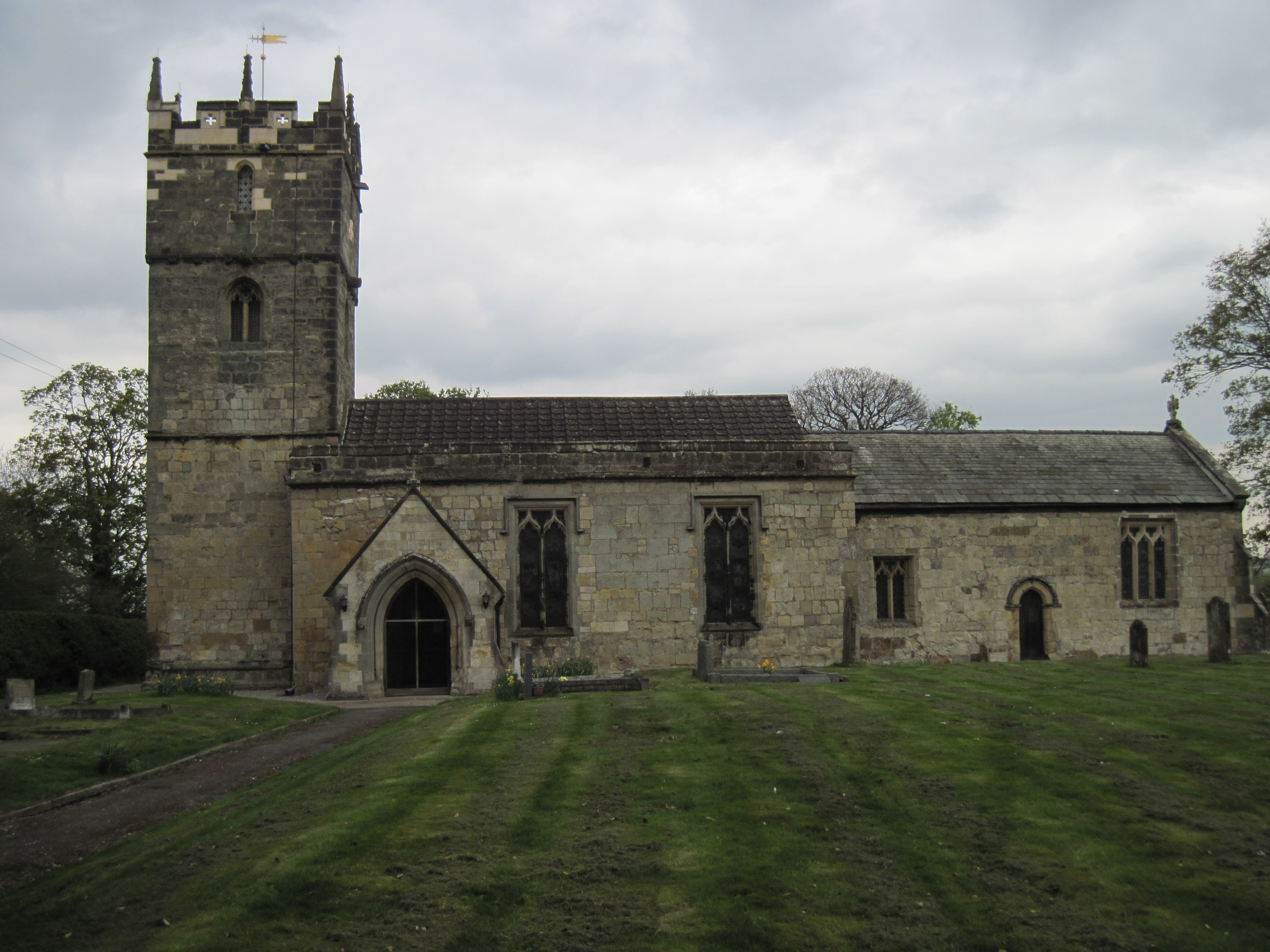
The church, in 2013

St Martin's Church is the parish church of Hayton, East Riding of Yorkshire, a village in England.

The church was built about 1170, from which period the nave and chancel survive. In the 14th century, a tower was built, and most of the windows were altered. The chancel roof was replaced in the 16th century, and the tower was heightened in the 19th century. The building was grade I listed in 1967.

The church is built of stone, with roofs of slate and tile, and consists of a nave, a north aisle, a chancel with a north chapel, and a west tower. The tower has three stages, a moulded plinth, string courses, and a two-light pointed west window. The middle stage has two-light pointed windows, and above are lancet windows, and a pierced embattled parapet with eight pinnacles. The round-arched south doorway is Norman, with two orders. Inside, Norman features include two doorways, corbels and the north arcade. There are also 17th-century wall paintings and an octagonal tub font.

== See also ==
- Grade I listed buildings in the East Riding of Yorkshire
- Listed buildings in Hayton, East Riding of Yorkshire
