= Listed buildings in Kirby Underdale =

Kirby Underdale is a civil parish in the county of the East Riding of Yorkshire, England. It contains ten listed buildings that are recorded in the National Heritage List for England. Of these, one is listed at Grade I, the highest of the three grades, and the others are at Grade II, the lowest grade. The parish contains the village of Kirby Underdale, the hamlets of Garrowby, Painsthorpe and Uncleby, and the surrounding countryside. Most of the listed buildings are houses, and the others consist of a church, a cross base in the churchyard, and a telephone kiosk.

== Key ==
Grade	Criteria
I	Buildings of exceptional interest, sometimes considered to be internationally important
II	Buildings of national importance and special interest

== Buildings ==
Name and location	Photograph	Date	Notes	Grade
All Saints' Church; 54.01701°N 0.76774°W		11th century	The church has been altered and extended thought the centuries, including a restoration in 1870–71 by G. E. Street who also rebuilt the chancel and porch. The church is built in stone with slate roofs, and consists of a nave with north and south aisles, a south porch, a chancel with a north vestry, and a west tower. The tower has two stages, a Norman west doorway with two orders on nook shafts with scallop capitals, above which is a small oblong window, bell openings with two square-headed mullioned lights, and an embattled parapet.	I
Cross base 54.01685°N 0.76777°W	—	14th century	The cross base is in the churchyard of All Saints' Church, to the south of the church. It is in gritstone, and consists of a cubical block with a central socket that has expanded on one side to form a seat.	II
The Manor House; 54.01654°N 0.76912°W	—	Late 17th century	The house is in red brick on a chamfered plinth, with a floor band, an elaborate stepped and dentilled brick eaves cornice, and hipped pantile roofs. There are two storeys, a U-shaped plan, and a front range of five bays, the middle bay projecting slightly. The central doorway has a fanlight, and the windows are cross-mullioned with horizontally sliding sashes.	II
Manor House, Uncleby; 54.02137°N 0.76418°W		Early 18th century	The farmhouse is in red brick on a plinth, with a stone block at the base of each corner, a floor band, a dentiled brick eaves cornice, and a pantile roof with raised coped gables and shaped kneelers. There are two storeys and four bays. On the front is a projecting porch, and the windows are sashes under segmental brick arches.	II
Beech Farmhouse; 54.01399°N 0.76082°W		Mid-18th century	The farmhouse is in red brick on a plinth, with a stepped brick eaves cornice and a pantile roof. There are two storeys, three bays, and a rear wing. The central doorway has a fanlight, and the windows are sashes, those on the ground floor under segmental arches.	II
The Old Rectory; 54.01696°N 0.76889°W		Mid-18th century (probable)	The house is in reddish-grey brick, with a floor band, a stepped brick eaves cornice, and a pantile roof with raised coped gables. There are two storeys, an irregular plan, a main range of three bays, and a gabled cross-wing on the left. On the main range is a full-height canted bay window, and the windows elsewhere are sashes.	II
School Farm House; 54.01687°N 0.77021°W		Mid to late 18th century	The house is in rendered brick with a pantile roof. There are two storeys and four bays. The doorway has a fanlight, the windows are sashes, and all the openings have segmental heads.	II
Cheesecake House; 54.00813°N 0.78554°W	—	Late 18th century	The house is in brown brick, with a stepped and dentilled eaves cornice and a slate roof. There are two storeys and three bays. The doorway has a fanlight, and the windows are sashes under flat gauged brick arches.	II
Painsthorpe Hall; 54.01520°N 0.76154°W		c. 1815	The house is in red-brown brick, with paired eaves brackets and a hipped slate roof. There are two storeys and three bays, the left bay projecting slightly. The central doorway has a fanlight, a sash window to the right and a garden door to the right. The upper floor contains sash windows, and all the openings have flat gauged brick arches. In the centre of the west front is a full-height canted bay window.	II
Telephone kiosk 54.01669°N 0.77039°W		1935	The telephone kiosk in Main Street is of the K6 type designed by Giles Gilbert Scott. Constructed in cast iron with a square plan and a dome, it has three unperforated crowns in the top panels.	II
