= All Saints' Church, Hessle =

Church in Hessle, East Riding of Yorkshire, England

Coordinates: 53.7241°N 0.4358°W

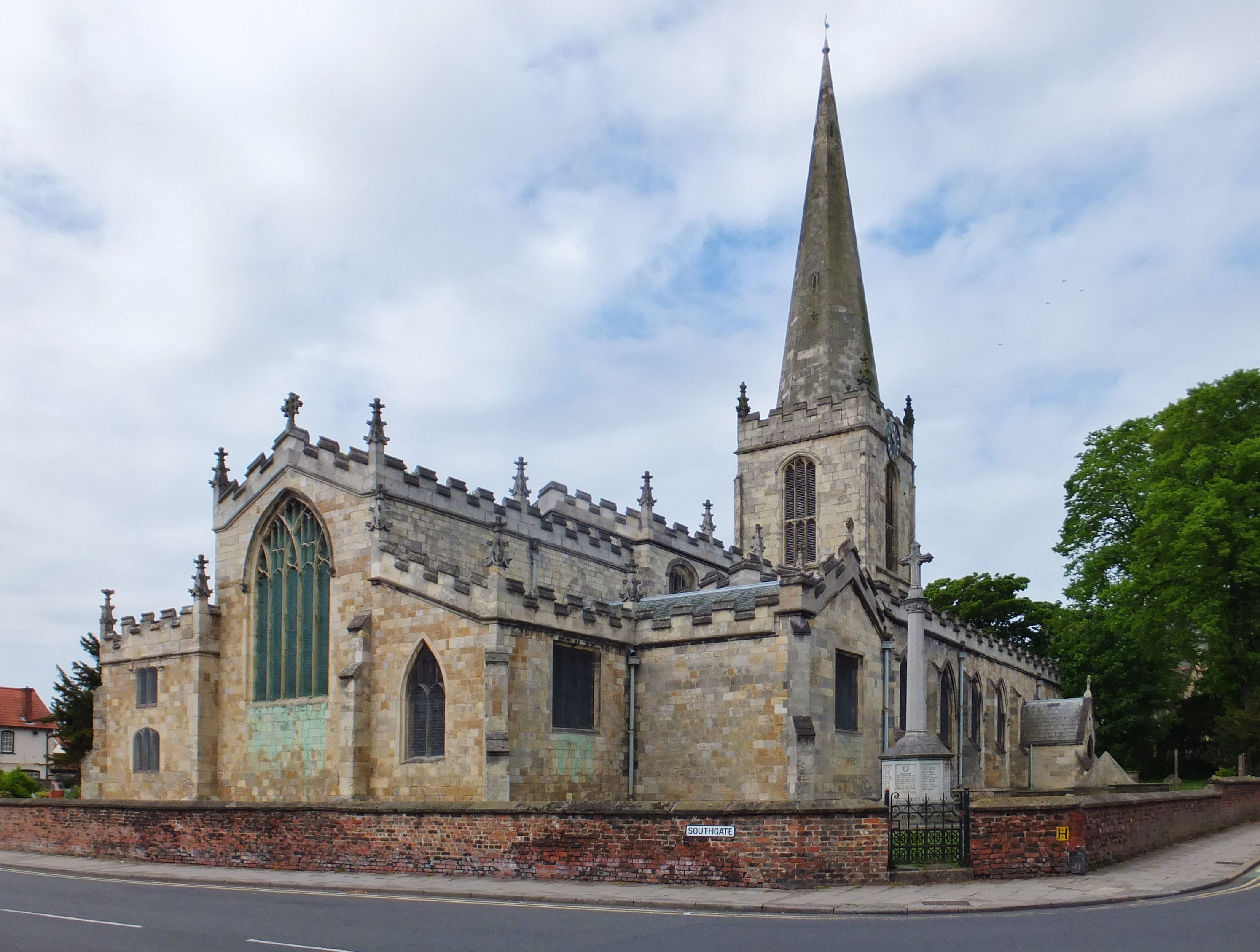
The church, in 2015

All Saints' Church is the parish church of Hessle, a town in the East Riding of Yorkshire, in England.

There was a church in Hessle from the mediaeval period. The oldest part of the current building is the nave, which dates from the reign of Stephen of England, in the 12th century. North and south aisles were added in the 13th century. In the 15th century, the tower was built, the nave was lengthened by two bays, and the aisles were widened. A gallery was added in 1802, but the church was neglected and in 1840 was closed for two years while the roof was repaired. The building was heavily restored between 1868 and 1870 by R. G. Smith. He completely rebuilt the chancel, using old materials, and added an organ chamber. The building was grade I listed in 1967. In 2025, work started to repair the tower and spire.

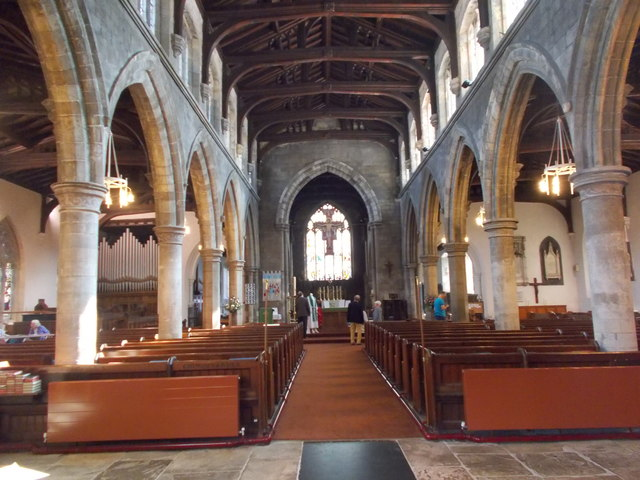
View from the nave into the chancel

The church is built of stone with lead roofs, and consists of a nave with a clerestory, north and south aisles, north and south porches, a chancel with north and south chapels and a north organ chamber, and a west steeple, the tower embraced by the aisles. The tower has three stages, buttresses, a pointed three-light west window, a moulded string course, three-light pointed bell openings, and clock faces, above which is a band and an embattled parapet with crocketed corner finials. On the tower is a tall spire with lucarnes. The whole of the body of the church has embattled parapets. Inside the church, a collection of Romanesque carved stones are set in the wall of the south chapel. One of the windows has stained glass by Morris and Co.

== See also ==
- Grade I listed buildings in the East Riding of Yorkshire
- Listed buildings in Hessle
