= Painsthorpe =

Hamlet in the East Riding of Yorkshire, England

Coordinates: 54°0′51″N 0°45′30″W

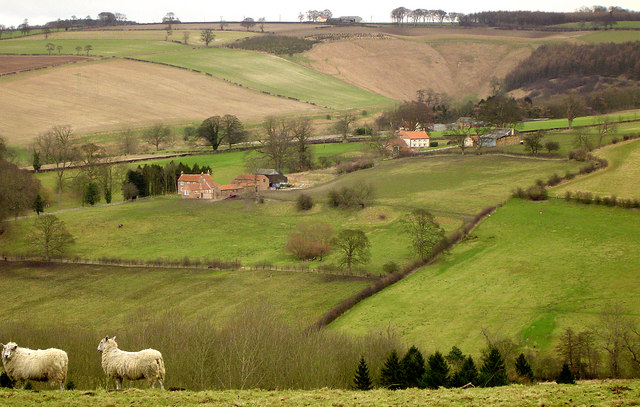
- Painsthorpe, looking west

- Location within the East Riding of Yorkshire
- OS grid reference: SE814583
- Civil parish: Kirby Underdale
- Unitary authority: East Riding of Yorkshire
- Ceremonial county: East Riding of Yorkshire
- Region: Yorkshire and the Humber
- Country: England
- Sovereign state: United Kingdom
- Post town: YORK
- Postcode district: YO41
- Dialling code: 01759
- Police: Humberside
- Fire: Humberside
- Ambulance: Yorkshire
- UK Parliament: Bridlington and The Wolds

Painsthorpe is a hamlet in the East Riding of Yorkshire, England.

It is located about 1 mile (1.6 km) east of the village of Kirby Underdale, the area is remote – the nearest settlement of any size is the small town of Pocklington some 5 miles (8 km) to the south. It forms part of the civil parish of Kirby Underdale and was the site of Painsthorpe Abbey, an Anglican Benedictine monastery.

== See also ==
- Listed buildings in Kirby Underdale
