= All Saints' Church, Market Weighton =

Church in Market Weighton, East Riding of Yorkshire, England

Coordinates: 53°51′54″N 0°40′01″W

The church, in 2014

All Saints' Church is the parish church of Market Weighton, a town in the East Riding of Yorkshire, in England.

The church was built in the 11th century, with the nave and perhaps part of the tower surviving from the period. The chancel was built in the early 13th century, when work was also done on the tower. Later in the century, the chancel was extended to the east. In the late 14th century, aisles were added to the nave. The tower was heightened in the 18th century. The church was heavily restored in the Victorian period, and was further altered between 1870 and 1872. It was grade I listed in 1967.

The chancel

The church is built of stone with freestone dressings, the upper part of the tower is in brick, and the roofs are in lead and slate. The church consists of a nave with a clerestory, north and south aisles, a south porch, a chancel with a north vestry, and a west tower embraced by the aisles. The tower has five stages, chamfered string courses, a west window, two-light bell openings in the upper two stages, clock faces, and an embattled parapet with eight crocketed pinnacles. The east window has five lights and Perpendicular tracery. Inside, there is a squint from the south aisle to the chancel, and there is a plain tub font dating from about 1100.

== See also ==
- Grade I listed buildings in the East Riding of Yorkshire
- Listed buildings in Market Weighton
