= Equestrian statue of William III, Kingston upon Hull =

Statue in Kingston upon Hull, East Riding of Yorkshire

Coordinates: 53.7410°N 0.3335°W

Equestrian statue of William III
- Statue in 2026
- Artist: Peter Scheemakers
- Completion date: 1734
- Type: Equestrian statue
- Medium: Lead with gilding
- Subject: William III
- Location: Kingston upon Hull

Listed Building – Grade I
- Official name: Statue of King William III and flanking lamps
- Designated: 13 October 1952
- Reference no.: 1197697

Listed Building – Grade II
- Official name: Public Toilets to North of King William III Statue
- Designated: 21 January 1994
- Reference no.: 1283102

The equestrian statue of William III stands in the Market Place, Kingston upon Hull, East Riding of Yorkshire, England. Dating from 1734, it was created by Peter Scheemakers. The statue is a Grade I listed structure.

== History ==
William III, Prince of Orange, ascended the English throne in 1688 following the overthrow of James II in the Glorious Revolution. William ruled jointly with his wife, Mary, James's daughter, until her death in 1694, and then solely until his own death in 1702. In the 18th century, it became common for members of the Whig Ascendancy to assert their support for the Protestant Succession, and by implication their opposition to the Jacobite challenge, by commemorating William. This approach was adopted in Hull; the statue being erected in 1734 with a dedication to "The memory of King William III our great deliverer". The designer was Peter Scheemakers, who was paid £893 and 10 shillings. (Note: Peter Scheemakers had originally created the statue for Bristol but the burghers of that city rejected it in favour of one by John Michael Rysbrack.) At the time of the Glorious Revolution, the city authorities in Hull had been supportive of James II, William's predecessor, but had been usurped by a faction supportive of William. These events were subsequently the subject of annual celebration in Hull, on a day known as the Town Talking Day.

The four lamps which stand at the corners of the statue are late-19th century additions. To the north of the statue is an underground public toilet dating from 1900. In the 21st century the condition of the statue had deteriorated, in part due to roadworks in the immediate vicinity relating to an upgrade to the A63 road. Hull City Council commissioned a conservation review of the statue's condition and it is to be restored and re-gilded in Spring 2026. (Note: The statue is the subject of a number of the city's urban myths, some of long standing; among them that the king dismounts his horse at the stroke of midnight and seeks refreshment in the King William public house, and that Scheemakers killed himself when it was pointed out that he had sculpted the king without stirrups.)

== Architecture and description ==
The sculpture is in gilded lead and depicts William in the style of a Roman senator. It stands on a stone plinth. The front of the plinth carries an inscription. The statue is a Grade I listed structure, the highest grading given to buildings and structures of "exceptional interest". David Neave, in his Yorkshire: York and the East Riding volume in the Pevsner Buildings of England series, revised and reissued in 2005, describes it as a "fine gilded equestrian statue".

Neave is equally appreciative of the public lavatory, "a rare survival of a little-altered Art Nouveau" design with tiling by Burmantofts of Leeds. It is a Grade II listed building.

== Gallery ==
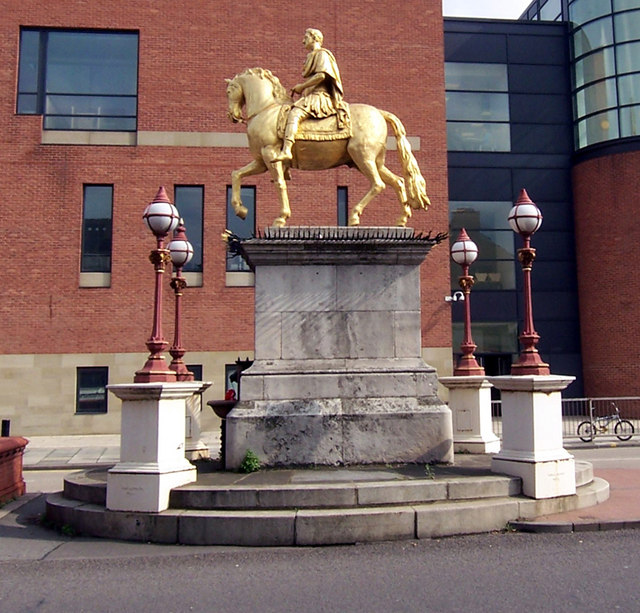
Statue and lamps

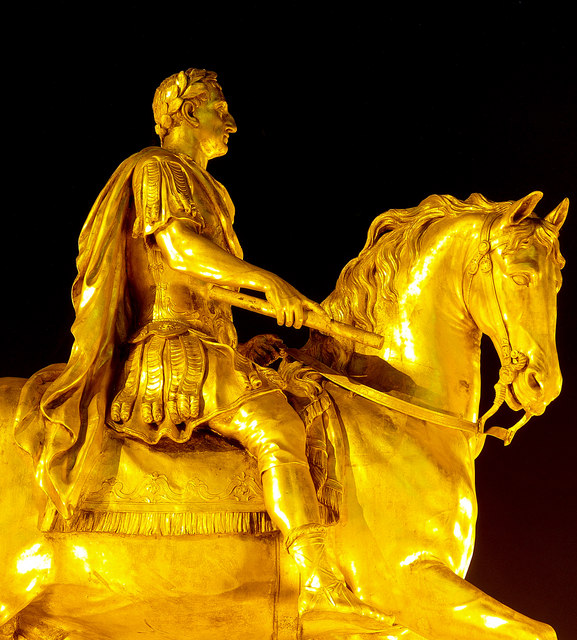
Statue at night in 2010

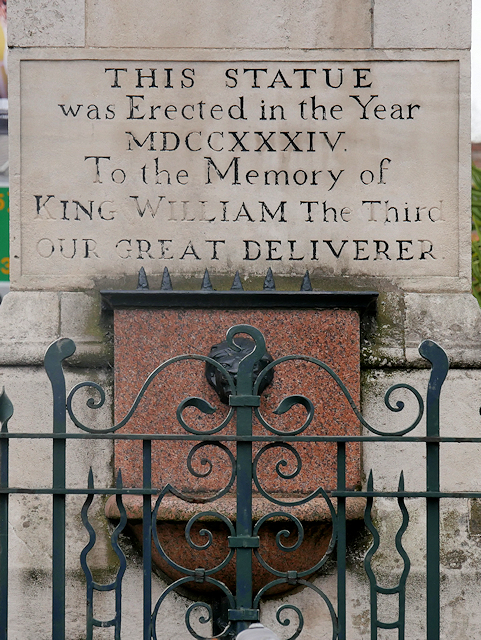
Dedicatory plaque

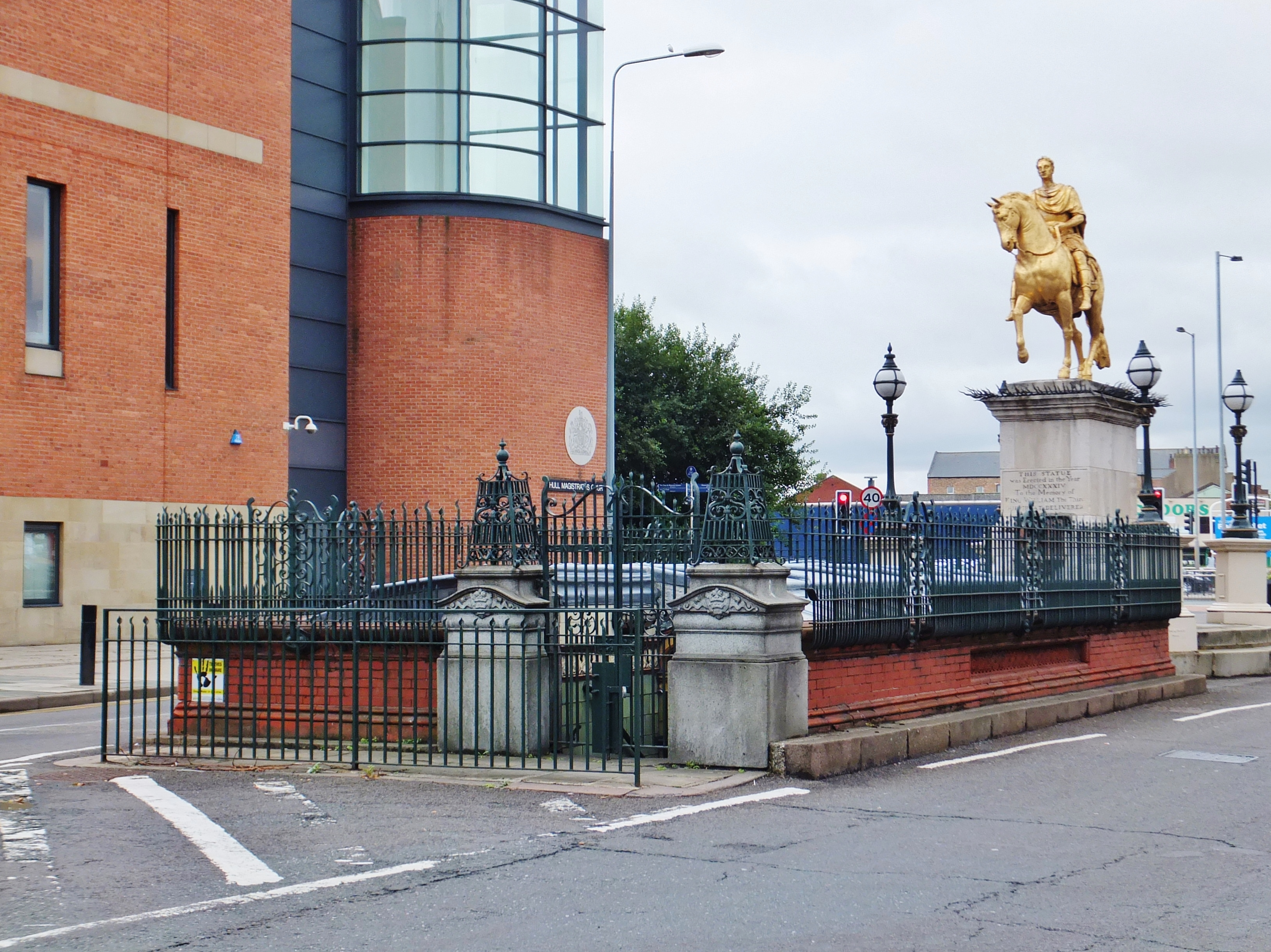
Elaborate railings around the public convenience

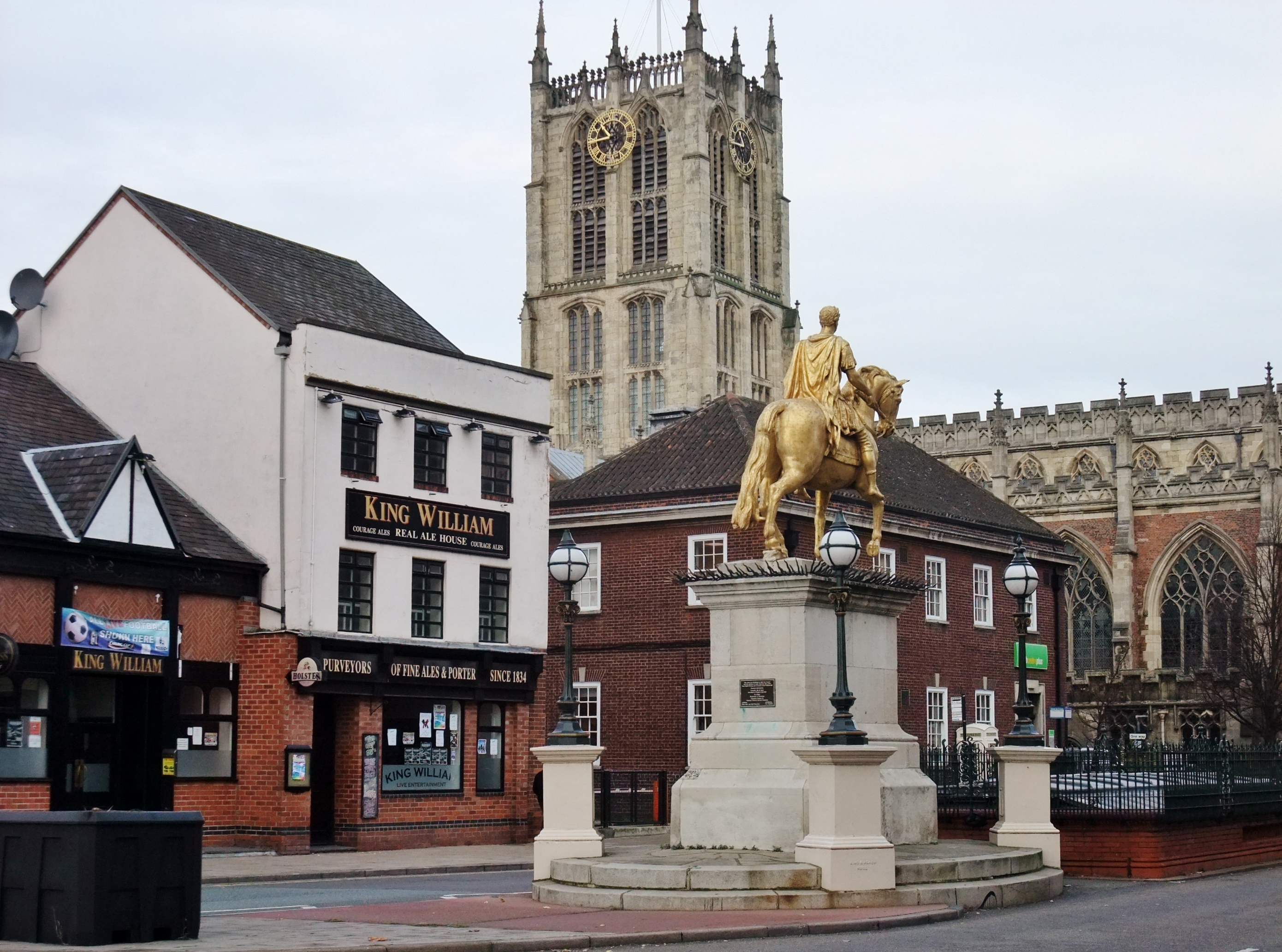
Setting

== See also ==
- Cultural depictions of William III of England
- Grade I listed buildings in East Riding of Yorkshire

== Sources ==
- Neave, David; Neave, Helen (2010). Hull. Pevsner City Guides. New Haven and London: Yale University Press. ISBN 978-0-300-14172-6.
- Pevsner, Nikolaus; Neave, David (2005). Yorkshire: York and the East Riding. The Buildings of England. New Haven and London: Yale University Press. ISBN 978-0-300-09593-7.
- Troost, Wout (2005). William III, The Stadholder-king: A Political Biography. Aldershot, UK: Ashgate Press. ISBN 978-0-754-65071-3. OCLC 470178112.
