= Listed buildings in Paull =

Paull is a civil parish in the county of the East Riding of Yorkshire, England. It contains nine listed buildings that are recorded in the National Heritage List for England. Of these, two are listed at Grade I, the highest of the three grades, and the others are at Grade II, the lowest grade. The parish contains the village of Paull and the surrounding countryside. The listed buildings consist of a church, the remaining tower of an otherwise demolished house, a farmhouse, a house and associated structures, a former battery later used as a museum, and three lighthouses.

== Key ==
Grade	Criteria
I	Buildings of exceptional interest, sometimes considered to be internationally important
II	Buildings of national importance and special interest

== Buildings ==
Name and location	Photograph	Date	Notes	Grade
St Andrew's Church; 53.71492°N 0.22527°W		Mid-14th century	The church has been altered and extended through the centuries, including a restoration in 1877–79. It is built in cobbles, limestone and brick, partly rendered, with slate roofs. The church has a cruciform plan, consisting of a nave, north and south aisles, north and south transepts, a chancel with a north vestry, and a tower at the crossing. The tower has three stages, quoins, moulded string courses, a west doorway, slit windows, pointed two-light bell openings, and a coped embattled parapet.	I
Paull Holme Tower; 53.70697°N 0.20596°W		Late 15th century (probable)	The remaining tower of a demolished house, now derelict, it is in banded red and blue brick, with some limestone dressings. There are three storeys and a parapet, and it is 35 feet (11 m) in height. On the middle floor of the west side is a two-light traceried window, above which is a 15th-century plaque containing a coat of arms. The south side has an entrance with a four-centred arch, and a narrow blocked pointed doorway to the right, and there are various other openings, some blocked.	I
Farmhouse, Old Little Humber Farm; 53.69524°N 0.17495°W		c. 1690–1700	The farmhouse is in rendered brick, with a cogged and stepped brick eaves cornice, and a pantile roof with raised gables. There are two storeys with an attic, a front of three bays, a rear wing, and a rear stair tower flanked by outshuts. On the front are sash windows, the central window inserted in a former doorway. On the right return is a French window, and horizontally sliding sashes on the outshuts. The stair tower has a gable with moulded brick kneelers.	II
The Hall; 53.71147°N 0.20000°W		Early to mid-18th century	The house, which was later extended, is in red brick, with a brick band at eaves level, a stone coped parapet, a double-span pantile roof with tumbled-in brick to the raised gables, and a parapet between the gables on the left return. There are two storeys, the original part with an L-shaped plan, a front range of five bays, and a single-bay extension with a Welsh slate roof recessed on the right. The central doorcase has panelled pilasters, an entablature, a frieze with raised panels, a moulded cornice and a pediment, and a doorway with a moulded cornice and a three-light fanlight in ornate reveals. The windows are sashes in architraves under flat rubbed brick arches. On the left return is a canted bay window.	II
Stables and coach house, The Hall; 53.71184°N 0.19941°W	—	Mid-18th century	The stables and coach house are in red brick with pantile roofs. The stable range has a single storey and five bays, the middle three bays projecting. It has stepped eaves and the roof is hipped on the right. In the centre is a doorway under a cambered arch with a fanlight flanked by oval windows in architraves. The coach house to the left has a single storey and attic, and one bay, and contains a round-arched carriage entrance with a keystone. The raised gable has tumbled-in brick and a circular wooden hatch containing a central circular hole surrounded by six round-headed dove holes. The rear gable has an oculus with radial glazing bars.	II
The Old Lighthouse and keepers' houses 53.71898°N 0.23446°W		1836	The lighthouse, the keeper's house to the south and the house to the east are in stuccoed brick, the houses with Welsh slate roofs. The lighthouse is a round tapered tower with three storeys, and it contains recessed horizontally sliding sash windows. The top floor has a flagstone balcony with wrought iron railings, a wide west-facing window, and a domed top with a flat-topped cylindrical ventilator. To the right is a two-storey single-bay house, and to the left is a single-storey annex leading to a two-storey two-bay house.	II
Paull Point Battery; 53.71345°N 0.22911°W		1861–64	The battery, later used as a museum, has the plan of a large irregular pentagon surrounding a parade ground, the longest face running parallel to the coast and about 200 metres (660 ft) in length. It has gun emplacements in reinforced concrete, and walls in red brick with York stone copings, and it contains wrought iron railings and gates. There are single-storey caponiers in the northwest and southwest corners, a small bastion on the east side, and long single-storey barrack blocks along the northeast and southeast walls.	II
Thorngumbald Clough High Lighthouse; 53.70818°N 0.22566°W		1870	The lighthouse has a base in brick and stone, and the upper parts are in wrought iron and are painted red. The base is drum-shaped and about 1 metre (3 ft 3 in) in height. On it is a tapering round tower with three stages, about 12 metres (39 ft) in height. The first stage is tall, and has an open framework with eight vertical ribs and six horizontal bands, and the middle stage has a rivetted outer casing. The top stage has a balcony with railings, a door to the south and a projecting rectangular window to the north. Above is a gutter, and a domed cap with a cylindrical ventilator.	II
Thorngumbald Clough Low Lighthouse; 53.70883°N 0.22688°W		1870	The lighthouse has a base in brick and flagstone with iron rails, and the upper parts are in wrought iron, and are painted white. The base has a rectangular plan and is about 2 metres (6 ft 7 in) in height, and a flight of steps leads up to a doorway on the south side. On the base is a tapering round tower with two stages, about 10 metres (33 ft) in height, on a concrete plinth. The bottom stage contains a low door, and a projecting rectangular window above. The upper stage has a cast iron balcony with railings, a small door and a small projecting square window. Above is a gutter, and a domed cap with a cylindrical ventilator.	II
