= Beverley Market Cross =

Structure in Beverley, England

Coordinates: 53.843°N 0.4326°W

The structure, in 2026

Beverley Market Cross is a historic structure in Beverley, a town in the East Riding of Yorkshire, in England.

A large market cross was first recorded in Saturday Market in the 15th century. In or shortly before 1707, it was damaged, and between 1711 and 1714 a replacement was constructed, to a design by Samuel Shelton. It was repaired between 1769 and 1770, and between 1797 and 1798, urns designed by E. Rushworth were placed on the roof. The structure was grade I listed in 1950.

The market cross is an open shelter, with an octagonal base of three steps, on which are four pairs of coupled Roman Doric columns, and an entablature with triglyphs and guttae, on which are eight urns. On the south side are cartouches. Above is an octagonal lead cupola roof on which is an elaborate square lantern, surmounted by an obelisk and a weathervane.

== See also ==
- Grade I listed buildings in the East Riding of Yorkshire
- Listed buildings in Beverley (central and northeast areas)
