= Langtoft, East Riding of Yorkshire =

Village and civil parish in the East Riding of Yorkshire, England

Coordinates: 54°05′14″N 0°27′22″W

Langtoft
- Location within the East Riding of Yorkshire
- Population: 492 (2011 census)
- OS grid reference: TA010667
  - London: 180 mi (290 km) S
- Civil parish: Langtoft
- Unitary authority: East Riding of Yorkshire
- Ceremonial county: East Riding of Yorkshire
- Region: Yorkshire and the Humber
- Country: England
- Sovereign state: United Kingdom
- Post town: DRIFFIELD
- Postcode district: YO25
- Dialling code: 01377
- Police: Humberside
- Fire: Humberside
- Ambulance: Yorkshire
- UK Parliament: Bridlington and The Wolds

Langtoft is a small village and civil parish in the East Riding of Yorkshire, England. It is situated 6 miles (10 km) north of Driffield town centre, and on the B1249 road between Driffield and Foxholes.

According to the 2011 UK census, Langtoft parish had a population of 492, an increase on the 2001 UK census figure of 457.

== Toponymy ==
The name Langtoft is derived from Old Norse langr or Old English lang 'long' and Old Norse topt 'site of a house'. It has etymological homonymy with Langtoft, Lincolnshire and Lanquetot (Normandy, Languetot 12th century).

== History ==
In 1823 Langtoft was a civil parish in the Wapentake of Dickering and the Liberty of St Peter's. Population at the time was 416. Occupations included thirteen farmers, two butchers, three shoemakers, two tailors, two grocers, a blacksmith, a corn miller, a stonemason, and the landlords of the George & Dragon and Nelson public houses. Carriers operated between the village and Driffield once a week.

The chronicler Peter Langtoft took his name from the village. Also resident in the village during the same era was Margaret De Langtoft, who later became one of the five nuns that formed the Sisterhood of Rosedale Priory in North Yorkshire.

In the centre of the village is the village green which was a pond, and is still referred to as such by some.

There is a monument to the villagers who died in the two World Wars.

=== 1991 Harrier incident ===
Kate Saunders, aged 22, who studied Classics at Queens' College, Cambridge with Cambridge University Air Squadron, on Wednesday 25 September 1991 ejected from a two-seat Harrier XZ147 from RAF Wittering, with pilot Sqn Ldr Ashley Stevenson, suffering a broken leg and pelvis; she was seriously ill with 28% burns; the ejection seat was typically designed for the weight of a male; she left hospital at the end of November 1991; in September 1994, she married her flight instructor from RAF Cranwell; she left the RAF in September 1995, being medically discharged. The 1991 incident featured on the 999 (British TV series), filmed in April 1993, and broadcast on Tuesday June 8 1993, series 2, episode 7.

=== Flooding ===
The village was flooded in 1657 and 1892. A plaque on the corner of Back Street and Front Street commemorates the floods with the words: "In commemoration of the great flood of Langtoft April 10th 1657 Height of flood unknown. Also the great flood of Langtoft July 3rd 1892 Height of flood 7½ feet".

Front Street floods to a minor extent during heavy rain. In 2007 the 'pond' flooded causing closure of the road.

== Amenities ==
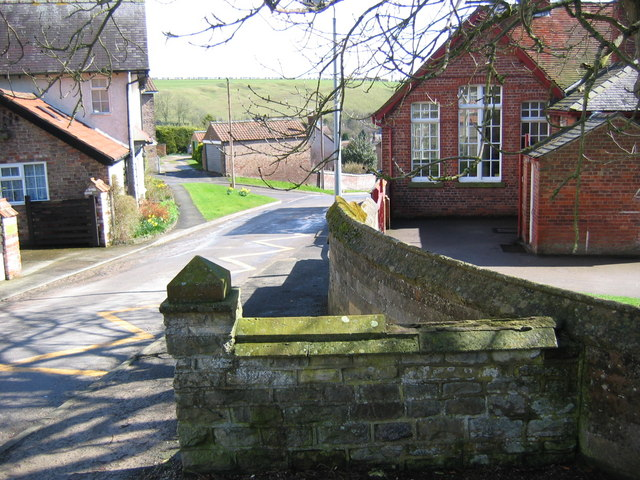
Langtoft primary school

The Anglican St Peter's Church, Langtoft was designated a Grade I listed building in 1968 and is now recorded in the National Heritage List for England, maintained by Historic England.

The village public house is The Ship Inn, which is open and trades 6 days a week. It offers home-cooked food and Sunday lunch. The village shop closed in 2007, and the post office in 2004. Some small businesses are present in the village.

Broadband is available through a scheme to connect all Yorkshire villages by Yorkshire Forward. Broadband is also available over WiFi using Wireless mesh network in a project started before ADSL was made available.

There used to be a primary school, which closed in July 2013. There is a school-bus service to nearby schools.

The village has grown over the past few years, with new houses being built. An estate development, however, has currently halted as the site is for sale; the previous developer ran out of money.
