= St Charles Borromeo, Hull =

Catholic Church in Kingston upon Hull, England

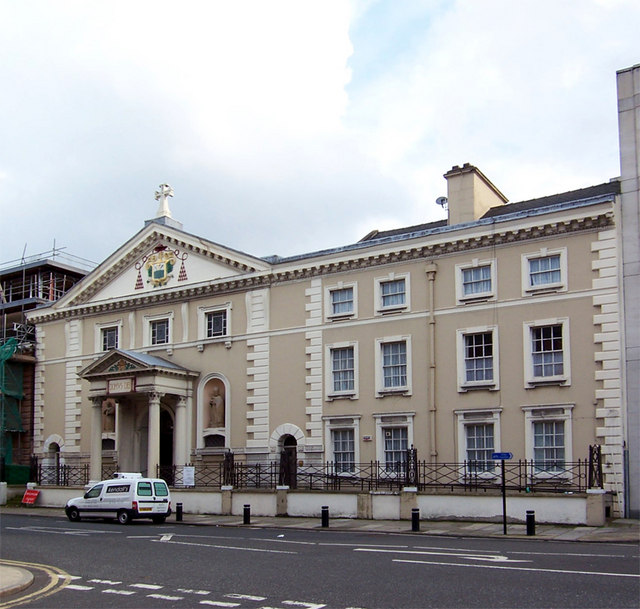
- The Church of St Charles Borromeo

- Church location shown within the East Riding of Yorkshire
- 53.7467°N 0.3386°W
- OS grid reference: TA 096 291
- Location: Jarratt Street, Hull, East Riding of Yorkshire, HU1 3HB,
- Country: England
- Denomination: Catholic Church

History
- Status: Parish church
- Consecrated: 1829

Architecture
- Architect(s): John Earle and J.J. Scoles
- Architectural type: Church: grade I listed

Administration
- District: Southern Vicariate
- Province: Archdiocese of Liverpool
- Diocese: Diocese of Middlesbrough

Clergy
- Rector: Father Philip Cunnah

St Charles Borromeo is a parish in the Diocese of Middlesbrough and is the oldest post-reformation Catholic parish church in the city of Kingston upon Hull, England. The church is a Grade I listed building, having been upgraded from a Grade II* in March 2016.

== History ==
Around 1774, Fr Charles Howard came from Marton to serve the small number of Catholics in Hull. In 1779 a chapel was established in Posterngate but it was destroyed in the Gordon Riots of 1780. Following the loss of the chapel Catholics were forced to meet in private until in 1798 when Fr Pierre Foucher arrived in Hull, fleeing the French Revolution. He was a wealthy man, possibly an aristocrat. He paid for a small chapel in North Street to be built from his own funds. He returned to France in 1820.

Fr John Smith was appointed to replace Fr Foucher. He obtained a site in Jarratt Street and began the construction of the present church. The church opened on 29 July 1829. The building of the church was begun by the architect John Earle (1778–1863). It was remodelled soon afterward by J. J. Scoles.

In later years the aisles were added and the present decor seen in the church was undertaken in 1899 under the stewardship of Canon Sullivan.

== Organ ==
The present organ was bought for St Charles' in about 1866. It had been built for St John's Church, Hull in either 1812 or 1815. Before being placed in St Charles' it had been at St Wilfrid's York. It was rebuilt and the design was modified by Messrs Forster and Andrews in 1909. The organ was further amended in 1959.

=== List of organists ===
- Mr. Cummins, 1829–1833
- T. F. Hewitt, 1833–????
- Richard W. Hall
- James Vincent Bregazzi, 1857–????
- Miss Jenny Cudworth
- James Vincent Bregazzi, ????–1869
- F. R. Muller, 1869–1874
- James Vincent Bregazzi, 1874–1900
- Edward Hunter
- Louis Hermann
- J. F. Harper
- H. F. Fawcett

== Schools ==
Two schools have links with the Church. These are St Charles Roman Catholic School on Norfolk Street and St Mary's College on Cranbrook Avenue.

== Interior decoration ==
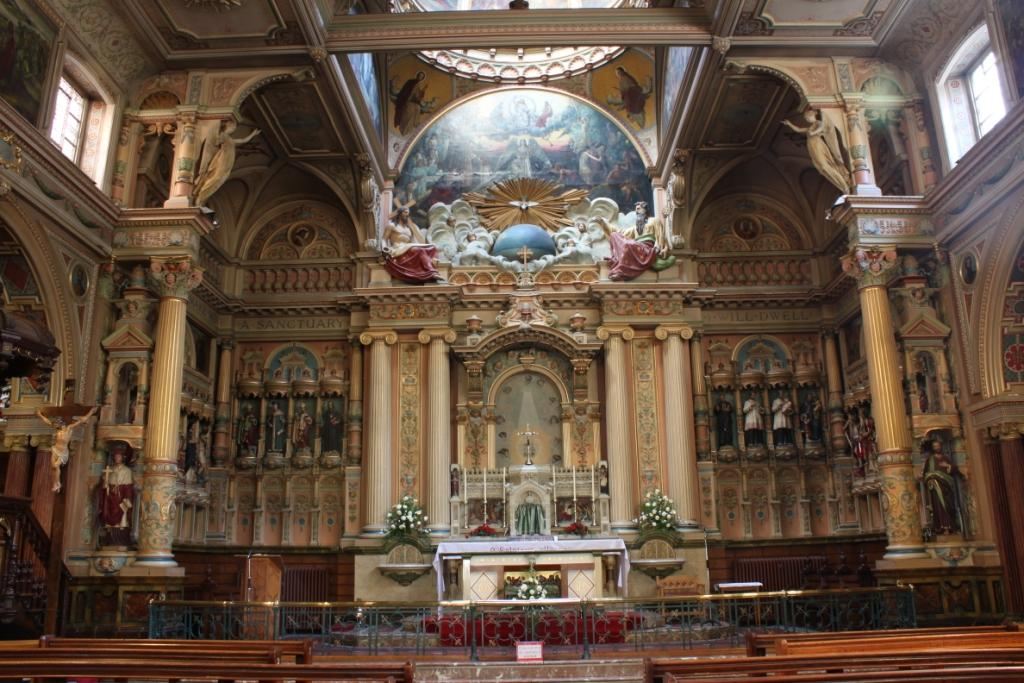
High altar, with altar rails and steps to the pulpit on the left.

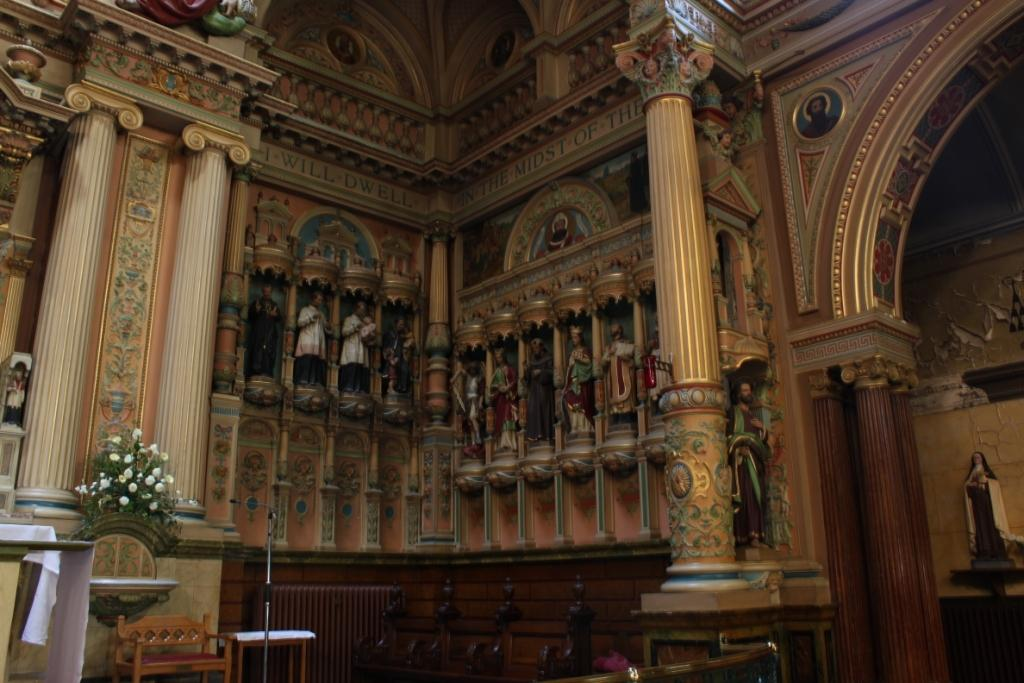
A part of the sanctuary

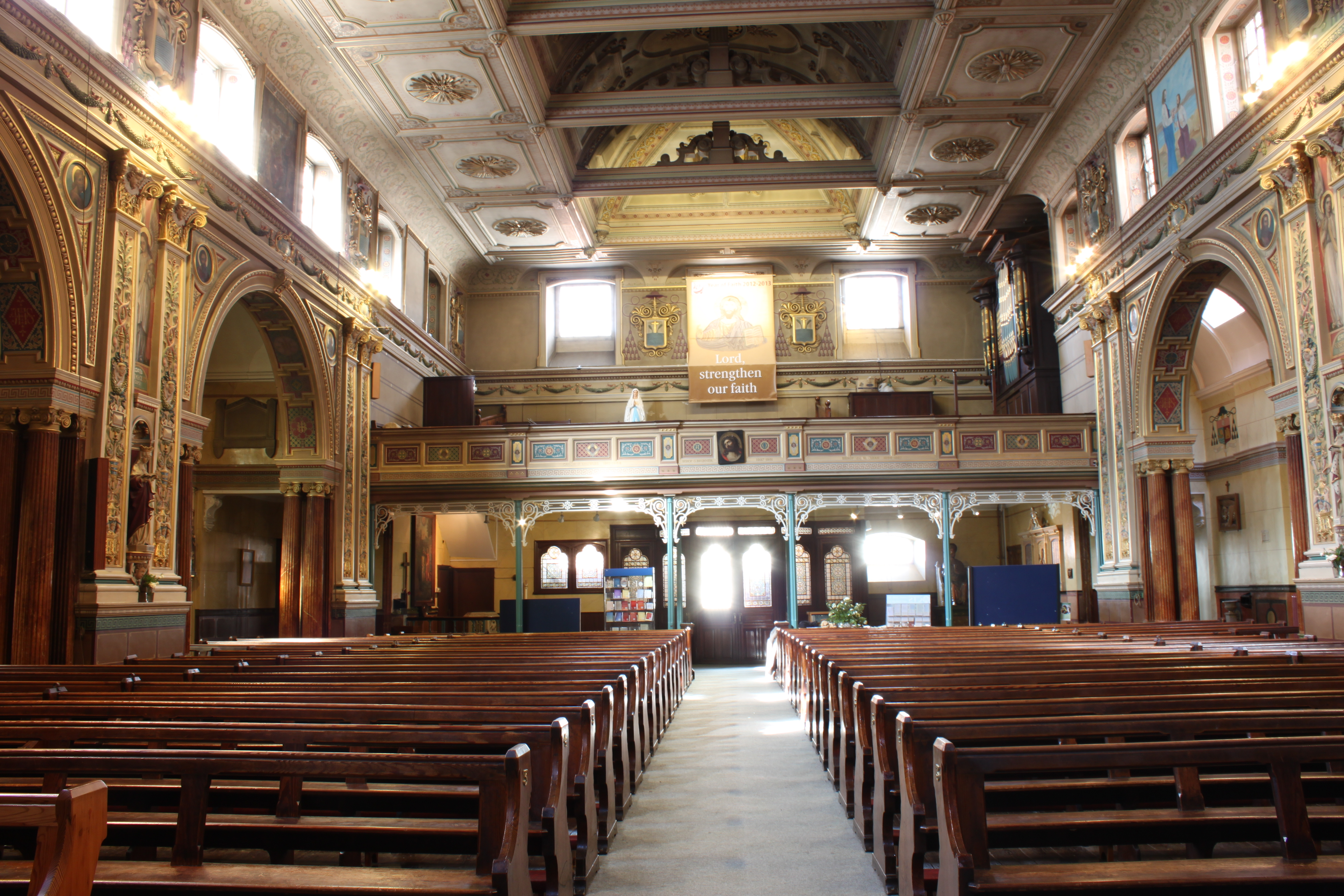
Nave and organ

== See also ==
- Grade I listed churches in the East Riding of Yorkshire
- Listed buildings in Kingston upon Hull (Myton Ward)
