= Hayton, East Riding of Yorkshire =

Village in the East Riding of Yorkshire, England

Coordinates: 53°54′06″N 0°45′13″W

Hayton
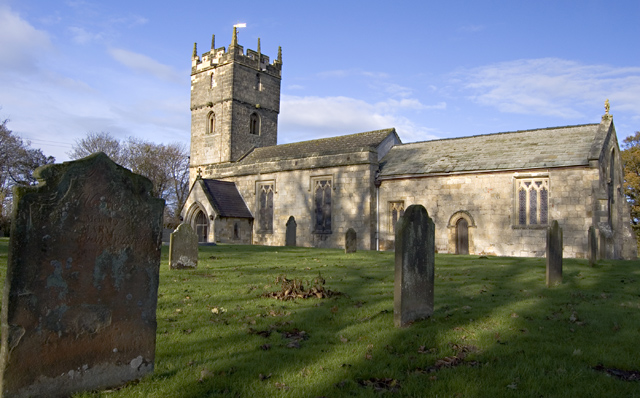
- St Martin’s Church, Hayton

- Location within the East Riding of Yorkshire
- Population: 360 (2011 census)
- OS grid reference: SE819457
  - London: 165 mi (266 km) S
- Civil parish: Hayton
- Unitary authority: East Riding of Yorkshire
- Ceremonial county: East Riding of Yorkshire
- Region: Yorkshire and the Humber
- Country: England
- Sovereign state: United Kingdom
- Post town: YORK
- Postcode district: YO42
- Dialling code: 01759
- Police: Humberside
- Fire: Humberside
- Ambulance: Yorkshire
- UK Parliament: Bridlington and The Wolds

Hayton is a village and civil parish in the East Riding of Yorkshire, England. It is situated approximately 2 miles (3 km) south of the market town of Pocklington and 4.5 miles (7 km) north-west of the market town of Market Weighton. It lies on the A1079 road.

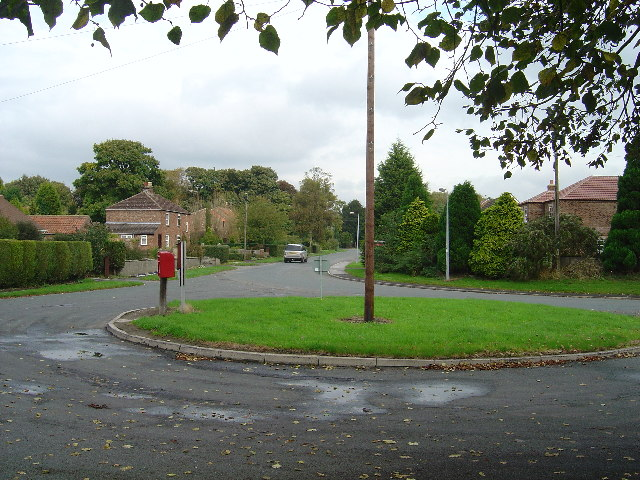
Village of Hayton

The parish includes Burnby together with the hamlet of Thorpe le Street. The parish covers an area of 1,729.333 hectares (4,273.27 acres), According to the 2011 UK census and the parish had a population of 360, an increase on the 2001 UK census figure of 317. Although the civil parish is called "Hayton" its parish council is called "Hayton and Burnby Parish Council". On 1 April 1935 Burnby and Thorpe le Street parish was abolished and merged with Hayton.

The name Hayton derives from the Old English hēgtūn meaning 'hay settlement'.

St Martin's Church, Hayton was designated a Grade I listed building in 1967 and is now recorded in the National Heritage List for England, maintained by Historic England.

In 1823 Hayton was a village and a civil parish in the Wapentake of Harthill. The ecclesiastical parish was Hayton-cum-Beilby, with the parish incumbent living under the patronage of the Dean of York. Population at the time was 177. Occupations included twelve farmers, a blacksmith, a wheelwright, a corn miller, a shoemaker, and the landlord of The White Horse public house.

== See also ==
- Listed buildings in Hayton, East Riding of Yorkshire
