= Fridaythorpe =

Village and civil parish in the East Riding of Yorkshire, England

Coordinates: 54°01′13″N 0°39′56″W

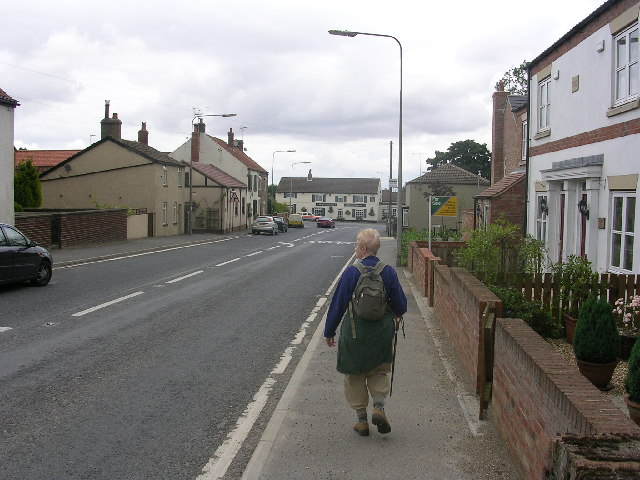
- Fridaythorpe

- Location within the East Riding of Yorkshire
- Population: 319 (2011 census)
- OS grid reference: SE875590
  - London: 170 mi (270 km) S
- Civil parish: Fridaythorpe
- Unitary authority: East Riding of Yorkshire
- Ceremonial county: East Riding of Yorkshire
- Region: Yorkshire and the Humber
- Country: England
- Sovereign state: United Kingdom
- Post town: DRIFFIELD
- Postcode district: YO25
- Dialling code: 01377
- Police: Humberside
- Fire: Humberside
- Ambulance: Yorkshire
- UK Parliament: Bridlington and The Wolds

Fridaythorpe is a village and civil parish in the East Riding of Yorkshire, England. It is situated approximately 8 miles (13 km) north-east of Pocklington town centre and lies on the A166 road. It is 550 feet (170 m) above sea level, making it the highest village in the Yorkshire Wolds.

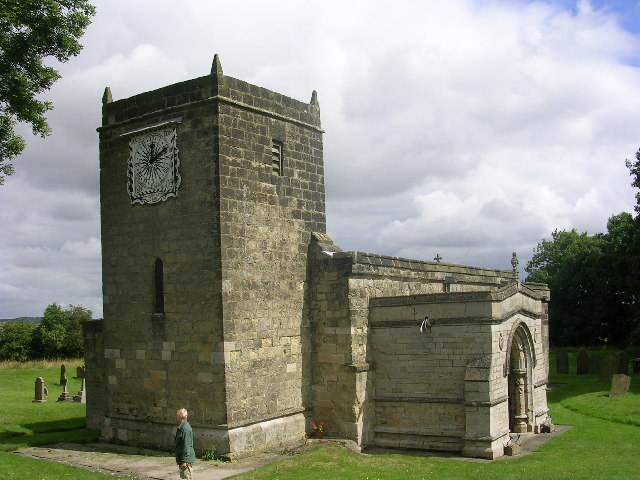
St Mary's Church, Fridaythorpe

According to the 2011 UK census, Fridaythorpe parish had a population of 319, an increase on the 2001 UK census figure of 183.

The name means "village of a man named Fridag", from an Old English name Frigedæg (or a similar Old Scandinavian name Frijádagr) and Old Norse þorp "village".

St Mary's Church, Fridaythorpe was restored in 1902–3 with the addition of a new north aisle designed by C. Hodgson Fowler and stained glass by Burlison and Grylls. In January 1967 the church was designated a Grade I listed building and is now recorded in the National Heritage List for England, maintained by Historic England. It is on the Sykes Churches Trail devised by the East Yorkshire Churches Group.

The Yorkshire Wolds Way National Trail, a long distance footpath passes through the village and the village is the midpoint of the trail.

Village amenities include a Mace general shop and petrol filling station, an agricultural store, a vehicle mechanic business, and a cafe.

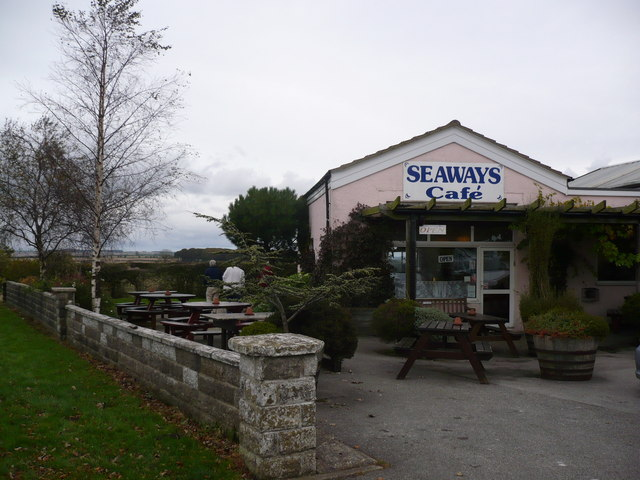
Seaways Cafe

In 1823 Fridaythorpe inhabitants numbered 275. Occupations included eleven farmers, three wheelwrights, two blacksmiths, two grocers, two shoemakers, three tailors, a tanner, and the landlords of the Cross Keys and Hare & Hounds public houses. Carriers operated between the village and Driffield every Thursday, and York every Saturday. In the village was a Methodist chapel.

The village previously hosted the World Championship Flat Cap Throwing Competition at its summer fete. The championship was last contested in 2014.
