= Kirby Underdale =

Village and civil parish in the East Riding of Yorkshire, England

Coordinates: 54°01′00″N 0°46′10″W

- Location within the East Riding of Yorkshire
- Population: 125 (2011 census)
- OS grid reference: SE806585
  - London: 175 mi (282 km) S
- Civil parish: Kirby Underdale
- Unitary authority: East Riding of Yorkshire
- Ceremonial county: East Riding of Yorkshire
- Region: Yorkshire and the Humber
- Country: England
- Sovereign state: United Kingdom
- Post town: YORK
- Postcode district: YO41
- Dialling code: 01759
- Police: Humberside
- Fire: Humberside
- Ambulance: Yorkshire
- UK Parliament: Bridlington and The Wolds

Kirby Underdale is a village and civil parish in the East Riding of Yorkshire, England. It is situated approximately six miles (ten kilometres) north of Pocklington town centre and lies one mile (1.5 km) north of the main A166 road from York to Driffield.

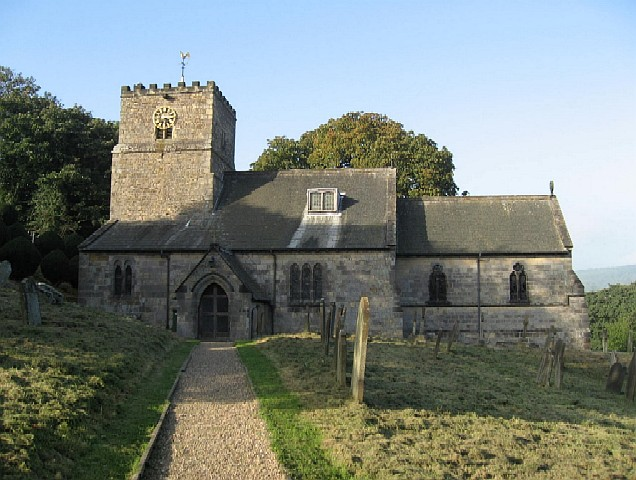
All Saints' Parish Church, Kirby Underdale.

The civil parish is formed by the village of Kirby Underdale and the hamlets of Garrowby, Painsthorpe and Uncleby. According to the 2011 UK Census, Kirby Underdale parish had a population of 125, a decrease on the 2001 UK Census figure of 129.

The name Kirby derives from the Old Norse kirkjubýr meaning 'village with a church'. Underdale derives from the Old Norse personal name Hundolf and the Old English dæl meaning 'dale' (valley).

All Saints' Church, Kirby Underdale was designated a Grade I listed building in 1987 and is now recorded in the National Heritage List for England, maintained by Historic England.

In Baines 1823 History, Directory and Gazetteer of the County of York, Kirby Underdale village and parish was listed as "Kirby Guderdale", and was in the Wapentake of Buckrose. All Saints' Church and its benefice was in the patronage of King George IV. Population at the time was 385, which included two farmers, one of whom was a butcher, a blacksmith, a grocer, and a carpenter. Included in the parish and its population was the hamlet of Garraby, one mile (1.5 km) south-west, with two farmers and Sir F. L. Wood.

Sir Francis Lindley Wood of Garrowby Hall and Hickleton Hall was lord of the manor and owner of most parish land, and provided a schoolmaster to teach poor parish children at Uncleby, a further parish hamlet one mile (1.5 km) north of Kirby. One mile (1.5 km) farther to the north was the parish hamlet of Hanging Grimston, and one mile (1.5 km) southeast, that of Painsthorpe, where Rear-Admiral Charles Richardson lived. The population by 1840 was 293, with parish occupations that included twenty-one farmers, two wheelwrights, two shopkeepers, a tailor, a woodman, and a gamekeeper. Further residents were a schoolmaster and schoolmistress, a parish clerk, a yeoman, and the parish incumbent at the rectory.

In 1868 a tumulus on the Uncleby Wold revealed two barrows, one British (70 feet) and one Anglo-Saxon (94 feet) the former inside the latter. 70 Anglo-Saxon skeletons were found among numerous relics from the two cultures.

== See also ==
- Listed buildings in Kirby Underdale
