= Scorborough =

Village in the East Riding of Yorkshire, England

Coordinates: 53°53′42″N 0°27′21″W

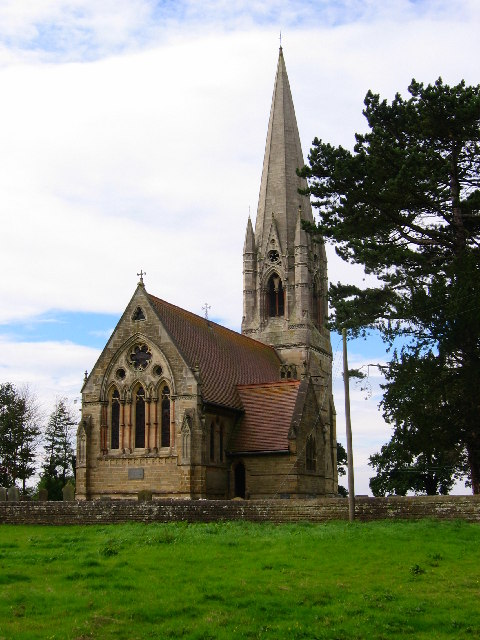
- St Leonards Church, Scorborough

- Location within the East Riding of Yorkshire
- OS grid reference: TA014454
- Civil parish: Leconfield
- Unitary authority: East Riding of Yorkshire
- Ceremonial county: East Riding of Yorkshire
- Region: Yorkshire and the Humber
- Country: England
- Sovereign state: United Kingdom
- Post town: DRIFFIELD
- Postcode district: YO25
- Dialling code: 01964
- Police: Humberside
- Fire: Humberside
- Ambulance: Yorkshire
- UK Parliament: Beverley and Holderness

Scorborough is a village and former civil parish, now in the parish of Leconfield, in the East Riding of Yorkshire, England. It is situated on the A164 road, about 4 miles (6.4 km) north of Beverley and 8 miles (13 km) south of Driffield. In 1931 the parish had a population of 85. On 1 April 1935 the parish was abolished and merged with Leconfield.

The name Scorborough derives from the Old Norse skógrbúð meaning 'temporary building in a wood'.

St Leonard's Church, Scorborough is designated a Grade I listed building and is now recorded in the National Heritage List for England, maintained by Historic England.

== See also ==
- Listed buildings in Leconfield
