= Winestead Drain =

River in the East Riding of Yorkshire, England

Winestead Drain Winstead Drain Winestead Fleet Patrington Channel
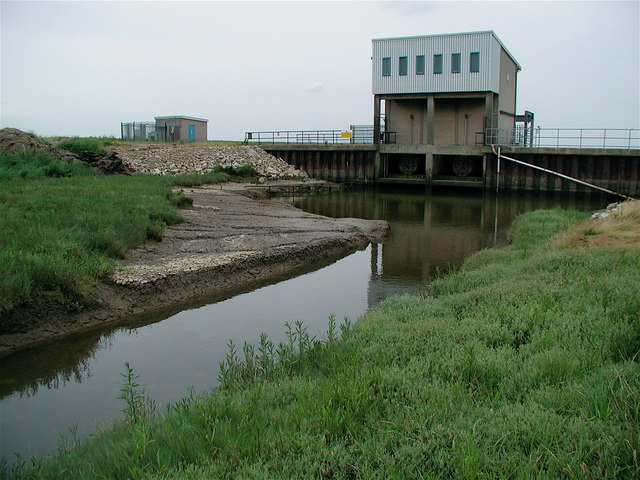
- Patrington Channel on the Humber Estuary. This is the rivermouth showing Winestead Outstrays pumping station

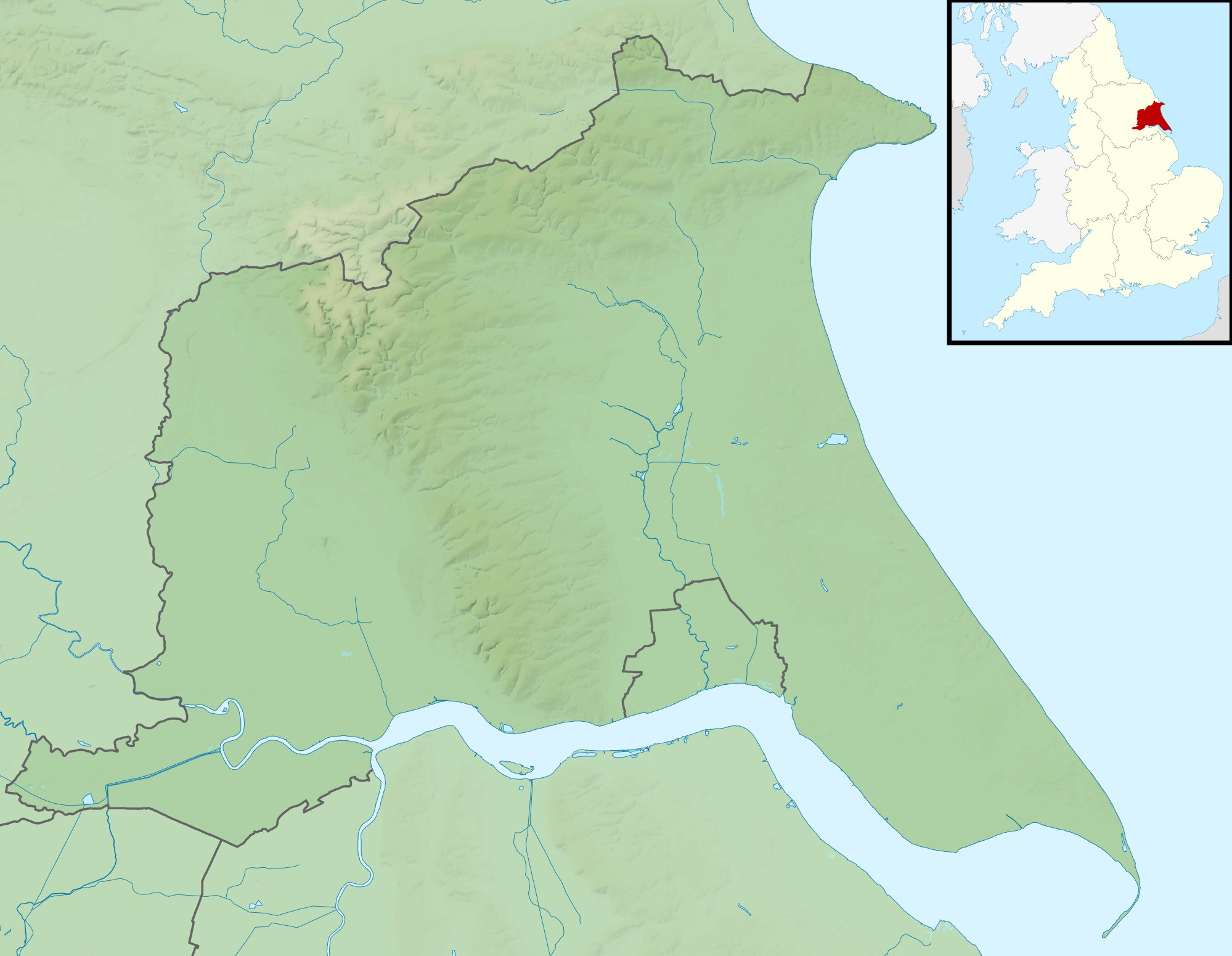
- Location within the East Riding of Yorkshire

Location
- County: East Riding of Yorkshire
- Country: England

Physical characteristics
- Source
  - location: Withernsea
  - coordinates: 53.728°N 0.018°E
  - elevation: 10 metres (33 ft)
- Mouth
  - location: Welwick Marsh
  - coordinates: 53.645°N 0.019°E
  - elevation: 5 metres (16 ft)
- Length: 15.5 kilometres (9.6 mi)
- Basin size: 59.64 square kilometres (23.03 sq mi)

Basin features
- EA waterbody ID: GB104026066570

Winestead Drain is a small river in the East Riding of Yorkshire, England. The river flows south from Withernsea, around Patrington, before turning eastwards towards the Humber Estuary. The river was noted for being an inland waterway bringing shipping to the lower Humber reaches, though the river is now not navigable.

Historically the river emptied into the North Channel of the Humber just south of Patrington Haven. However, due to human intervention for drainage and flood prevention, the North Channel was cut off at the western end, and the installation of a sluice gate stopped the natural scouring of the channel by incoming and outgoing tides. This allowed the river to silt up making it unusable for watercraft.

== Course ==
The river rises to the west of Withernsea between the B1242 and B1362 roads. The river drains a wide flat valley here with mostly alluvium on the surface. It runs in a south-westerly direction towards Winestead, where a measuring station noted a record height of 3.38 metres (11.1 ft) in November 2000. The river then curves to the south before picking up North Channel - the old body of water that separated Sunk Island from the rest of Holderness as part of the Humber Estuary - and then heads eastwards towards the Humber Estuary past Patrington Haven and its silted up access channel to the old port. The river flows for 15.5 kilometres (9.6 mi) and drains an area of 55.6 square kilometres (21.5 sq mi).

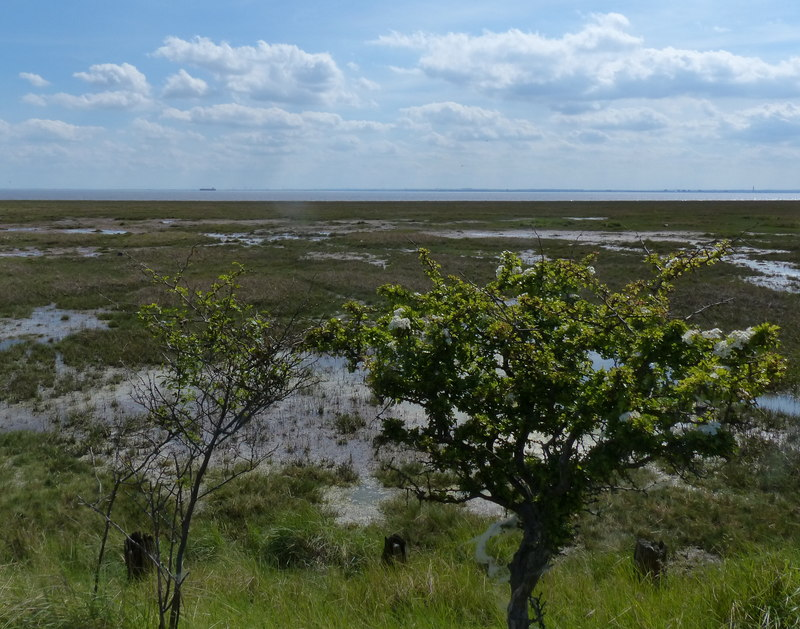
Welwick Saltmarsh Nature Reserve

At the mouth of the river is a pumping station which was built in 1977. The station controls the flow of water between the river and the tidal estuary, preventing tidal waters from entering Winestead Drain. On the eastern side of the river's mouth is Welwick Saltmarsh, a nature reserve covering 44 hectares (110 acres). The pumping station, known as Winestead Outstrays, failed during the floods on 26 June 2007, when the river level reached a height of 2.42 metres (7 ft 11 in), its highest ever recorded. Due to a re-alignment of sandbanks on the tidal Humber, the pumping station at the rivermouth is projected to move 750 metres (2,460 ft) inland upstream, and will incorporate an eel pass.

The expansion of the intertidal wetlands will add 75 hectares (190 acres) of wet grassland to the land north of Winestead Drain. The section of the river that flows across the mudflats of the estuary is Known as Patrington Channel, which is also a name used for the river as far upstream as the old port at Patrington Haven. The banks of the drain have been raised on either side of the river due to the risk of tidal flooding from the Humber Estuary, with most of the hinterland either side of Winestead Drain being below the normal spring tide level.

== History ==
Up until the late seventeenth century, the water from Winestead Drain emptied into the Humber Estuary into what was called the North Channel; a body of water which was part of the Humber Estuary, but which flowed to the north of Cherry Cobb Sands and Sunk Island. Both Cherry Cobb and Sunk Island were saltmarshes covered by water at high tide, but were revealed at low tide. Human interference in the terms of artificial drainage and building up of sandbanks, meant that gradually, the North Channel became separated from the main stem of the estuary at its western end, and by 1850, the North Channel was a small drain feeding waters eastwards only and Sunk island and Cherry Cobb Sands had become fertile lands attached to the mainland of South Holderness. This added a journey of 3.2 kilometres (2 mi) extra for shipping leaving Patrington Haven and reaching the Humber as the water now ran to the east in a narrower channel. The result of the loss of flowing water, both incoming and outgoing tides, allowed the drain to silt up and eventually made the drain impassable to boats which used the small inlet to Patrington Haven. The issue of the drainage over the reclaimed land prompted many Acts of Parliament being passed between 1764 and 1807, with the Winestead Drainage Act being passed in 1774.

After siltation proved problematic in 1819, the Winestead Level Internal Drainage Board installed a clow (a type of sluice gate) on the lower part of the North Channel, and it became known as Winestead Drain instead of the North Channel. In 1839, a novel method of clearing silt and maintaining the navigation was employed on the lower reaches of the drain. A machine known as a Floating Clough was positioned on the drain below where Patrington Haven entered the Winestead Drain. The machine was made of timber with various wooden projections sideways and longways which had serrated edges. It was allowed to sink on the incoming tide, and would then travel downstream with the outgoing tide maintaining the channel and "dressing the mud on the sides". The outgoing tidal force would maintain a dam behind the machine forcing it onwards for about 3 miles (4.8 km) down the drain.

The problems of slow-moving or sluggish water in the drain had an effect on the lives of those living near to it in the 1860s. The Winestead Level Drainage Board notes for 1862 record that drinking water was poisoned, animals of the fields fell ill when drinking the water, and the stationmaster at Winestead noted that "the smell was so great to produce nausea all day, and for railway passengers to close the windows."

Developments further upstream on the Humber have taken areas which were feeding grounds for wading birds such as the golden plover, curlew and redshank. As a result, over a 400 hectares (1,000 acres) of farmland at Skeffling and Sunk Island are being given over to intertidal wetlands. This will mean that the Winestead Drain will have a long southern edge against a new marsh wetland. The South Holderness Internal Drainage Board objected to the defences being moved inland in 2019 as it will make the older pumping station inaccessible during times of flood. The original plan was to have no pumping facilities whatsoever. The South Holderness Internal Drainage Board is responsible for maintaining parts of Winestead Drain, though historically, this was the responsibility of the Winestead Level Internal Drainage Board (IDB) until 2013.

== Wildlife ==
The drain is covered by a conservation of wild birds directive. Where the Winestead Drain meets the Humber is Welwick Saltmarsh, which is home to short-eared owl, hen harrier, peregrine falcon, and marsh harrier. Work has been undertaken to remove the banks around the southern side of Winestead Drain and create a new wetland, which will attract a similar variety of raptors as those listed already. Otters were listed as being present on the beck in the 1960s, even as far north as Winestead village. The waterbody has suffered low oxygen levels and has been exposed to phosphates and sediment, all of which are a problem for aquatic life. The middle section of the river takes on several smaller streams from both the east and the west, including one from Hollym which carries foul water, as there is no drainage for foul water at Hollym.

Fishing is promoted on the drain with bream, roach, rudd and perch known to have been caught in the lower reaches. As part of the conversion of the bank of the Humber to new wetland status, fishing platforms were installed on the lower Winestead Drain.

== Shipping ==
In 1540, John Leland was travelling through the area, and described the port at Patrington Haven as "..a haven or creek for ships." A map of Holderness from 1797, shows a small portion of the land known as Sunk Island being surrounded by saltmarshes, and Winestead Drain spilling into the saltmarsh directly via a watercourse known as North Channel. Due the land reclamation of the saltmarshes which diverted Keyingham Drain and shortened the North Channel, Winestead Drain now extends eastwards towards the Humber, setting the port of Patrington Haven some 3 miles (4.8 km) north of the river, when before reclamation it was only 1.5 miles (2.4 km) distant. Those who used to bring fishing vessels up the creek into Patrington Haven, relocated their vessels to be berthed at Stone Creek, the mouth of Ottringham Drain after it was diverted.

The mass turnpiking of the 18th century, brought favourable life to the port at Patrington Haven, when Sir Robert Hildyard, a local landowner, heavily invested in the road-building scheme from Patrington Haven to Hedon and Hull, which improved trade at the port for some time.

In the early part of the 19th century, about 3,000 chaldrons of lime were being imported in Patrington Haven from the West Riding of Yorkshire. These were brought overland by a trade route that also carried goods to the West Riding from Patrington Haven. Other commodities traded at the port included grain and corn sent to London, and coal imported from the West Riding. The board of Trustees was dissolved in 1865, and the last ship sailed on the Haven in 1867.

A warehouse at the head of the navigation from the sea still exists and has partially been converted into a house. The minor tributary that fed into Winestead Drain from Patrington Haven was infilled c. 1970.
