= Grade I listed churches in the East Riding of Yorkshire =

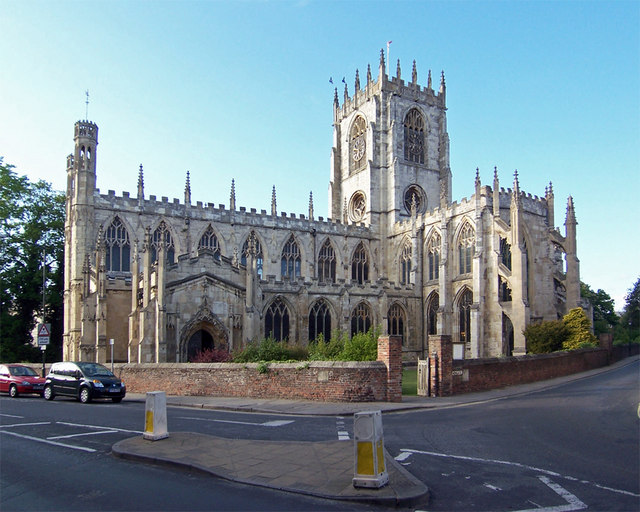
St Mary's Church, Beverley

The East Riding of Yorkshire is a local government district with the status of a unitary authority. For ceremonial purposes it includes the neighbouring city and unitary authority of Kingston upon Hull.

Buildings in England are given listed building status by the Secretary of State for Culture, Media and Sport, acting on the recommendation of English Heritage. Listed status gives the structure national recognition and protection against alteration or demolition without authorisation. Grade I listed buildings are defined as being of "exceptional interest, sometimes considered to be internationally important"; only 2.5 per cent of listed buildings are included in this grade. This is a complete list of Grade I listed churches and chapels in the East Riding of Yorkshire (including Kingston upon Hull) as recorded in the National Heritage List for England.

Christian churches have existed in the area covered by this list since Anglo-Saxon times, although architectural features from that era are uncommon. Norman features are much more common and are found in many churches, including St Martin, Burton Agnes, St Mary, Fridaythorpe, All Hallows, Goodmanham, and St Nicholas, Newbald. All but three of the churches in the list were built before the 17th century, and all of them contain features of English Gothic architecture, all periods of this style being represented. Three churches were built in the 19th century. The Chapel of the Virgin and St Everilda at Everingham (1836–39) is a Roman Catholic chapel in Italianate style. The other two churches are in Gothic Revival style: St Leonard's Church, Scorborough (1857–59), and St Mary's Church, South Dalton (1858–61). Gothic Revival architecture is also found in additions made to churches during the 19th and 20th centuries in, for example, St James, Nunburnholme, and All Saints, Skipsea.

The area contains little good material for building churches, much of it lying on chalk and clay. There are some deposits of limestone and sandstone, but their quality does not allow for the production of a good ashlar finish. Many churches in York are built from better quality limestone quarried from outside the area, from Tadcaster and Thorner. An unusual building material for some of the churches in the area is "cobble", which consists of rounded boulders from the beach at Holderness. Churches in the list containing cobbles include All Saints, Easington, All Saints, Preston, and St Peter and St Paul, Burton Pidsea.

== Churches ==
Name	Location	Photograph	Notes
All Saints	Adlingfleet; 53.6787°N 0.7238°W		All Saints dates mainly from the 13th century, with re-set north and south doorways from the previous century. The south aisle, clerestory and tower were added in the 15th century. The chancel was altered in the late 18th century. The church was restored in 1828, and again in 1955–57, the latter restoration being by George Pace. In the chancel is a 13th-century piscina. Also in the church are numerous monuments, dating from the 14th century and later.
All Saints	Aughton; 53.83934°N 0.9352°W		Part of the church is built in limestone, with the north aisle and the chancel in brick. It originates from the 12th century with a Norman nave, an Early English north aisle, and a Perpendicular west tower and chancel. The church was restored in 1891–93. On the tower are carvings of grotesques, and a row of seven shields. The Norman font is drum-shaped.
St Andrew	Bainton; 53.9584°N 0.5306°W		Most of the church was built in the 1330s–1340s, although the southeast corner of the chancel dates from about 1280. In 1715 the spire was damaged by wind and had to be truncated. In 1840–43 the church was restored by Henry Wheatley, and a further restoration was carried out in 1866–89 by James Fowler when the spire was removed. Inside the church are a Norman font, a pulpit of 1903 by Temple Moore, and stalls of 1949 by George Pace.
All Saints	Barmston; 54.0128°N 0.2366°W		The nave and chancel are originally Norman, dating from the 12th century. The southwest tower and most of the windows date from the 15th century and are Perpendicular in style. The font is Norman, and also in the church is a hogback stone that has been moved from elsewhere. A window in the south aisle contains fragments of medieval stained glass figures.
Beverley Minster	Beverley; 53.8393°N 0.4245°W		It is likely that a monastic church was built on the site in the 9th century. This was replaced by a collegiate church from 1214, with additions and alterations being made until the 15th century. Since the Reformation it has functioned as a parish church. It is mainly in Perpendicular style, with twin towers at the west end. There were restorations in the 18th and 19th centuries, the latter being carried out by George Gilbert Scott.
St Mary	Beverley; 53.8442°N 0.4337°W		Established in the middle of the 12th century, most of the church dates from the 14th and 15th centuries. Around its exterior are battlemented parapets, crocketed pinnacles, and flying buttresses. During the 19th century it was restored by A. W. N. Pugin and E. W. Pugin, and later by George Gilbert Scott. The ceiling of the chancel, dating from 1445, is decorated with panels containing paintings of 40 English kings, and the early 15th-century choir stalls contain 43 carved misericords.
St Edith	Bishop Wilton; 53.9868°N 0.7842°W		The church dates from the 12th century with an elaborately carved Norman chancel arch and south doorway. The west tower with its spire were added in the 14th century. The church was restored in 1858–59 by J. Loughborough Pearson for Sir Tatton Sykes, 4th Baronet. Inside the church is a choir screen designed by G. E. Street and a font and cover by Temple Moore.
St Andrew	Boynton; 54.0952°N 0.2636°W		The west tower dates from the 15th century, and the rest of the church from 1768 to 1770, the likely architect being John Carr. In 1910 the interior of the church was reordered by John Bilston. Inside the church is a Norman font, a pulpit dated 1768, and monuments from the 17th century and later.
St Mary	Brandesburton; 53.9129°N 0.2972°W		The church originated in the 12th century, and has a surviving Norman priest's doorway, and Norman fragments inside the tower. The aisles and west tower date from the 13th century. In 1892 the church was restored by W. S. Weatherley. Inside the church are brasses dating from the 14th century.
Bridlington Priory	Bridlington; 54.0944°N 0.2018°W		This originated as an Augustinian priory. Following the Dissolution of the Monasteries it was demolished, other than the nave and aisles of the church, and the gateway. The nave was converted into the parish church of St Mary, its eastern three bays forming the chancel. At the west end are two dissimilar towers, the northwest dating from the early 13th century, and the southwest from the 15th century. In the 1870s George Gilbert Scott added a top stage to both towers.
All Saints	Bubwith; 53.8170°N 0.9206°W		Originating in the 12th century, additions were made in the following two centuries. In the 15th century, the south aisle, the clerestory and the west tower were paid for from the will of the Rt Revd Nicholas de Bubwith, late Bishop of Bath and Wells. The church has retained a Norman chancel arch. The octagonal font dates from the 15th century.
St Andrew	Bugthorpe; 54.0112°N 0.8227°W		The church dates from the 12th century with a Norman chancel arch. The west tower was added in the 15th century. The nave was rebuilt in 1858–59 by Mallinson and Healey. In 1936–37 the interior was restored and refurnished by H. S. Goodhart-Rendel. Inside the church are a coffin lid from the late 12th or early 13th century, and a cross-slab from the 13th century.
All Saints	Burstwick; 53.7342°N 0.1404°W		The nave dates from the 13th century, the south chapel from the early 14th century, and the tower, chancel, north aisle, and north chapel from the 15th century. There were restorations in 1830, 1853 and 1893. Hanging in the church are the Royal Arms of Charles I, on the reverse of which is a painting of the king's execution, painted by the then vicar and placed in the church in 1676. There are fragments of 15th-century stained glass in a chancel window.
St Martin	Burton Agnes; 54.0535°N 0.3180°W		Originating in the 11th century, the body of the church is basically Norman, with a Perpendicular tower and clerestory added in the 15th century. The chancel was rebuilt in 1730, and other alterations were carried out in 1840–54 by the vicar, Revd Robert Wilberforce, in memory of his father, William. Inside the church is a hammerbeam roof, choir stalls with misericords, a Norman font, a pulpit dated 1730, and monuments, the earliest dating from 1337.
St Peter and St Paul	Burton Pidsea; 53.7612°N 0.1023°W		This church dates from the early 13th century, with additions in the following century, and a tower added in the 15th century. The chancel was rebuilt in 1838, and the church was restored in 1866–68 by Charles Hutchinson. The octagonal font dates from the 13th century.
St Mary	Cottingham; 53.7823°N 0.4116°W		This is a cruciform plan church, the nave, aisles and transepts dating from the early 14th century, and the chancel from the later part of the century. They are in Decorated style, with the 15th-century central tower in Perpendicular style. Pinnacles were added to the tower in 1744. Inside the church are many memorials, and much of the stained glass was designed by Jean-Baptiste Capronnier.
All Saints	Driffield; 54.0077°N 0.4420°W		The church has pre-Conquest origins, the nave and clerestory date from the 12th century, the aisles and chancel from the early 13th century, and the west tower from the 15th century. In 1878–80 George Gilbert Scott, Jr. rebuilt the north aisle, and added the north chapel. Inside the church are fragments of carved stones dating from the 12th and 13th centuries.
All Saints	Easington; 53.6502°N 0.1152°E		All Saints originated in the 12th century, with additions and alterations during the following four centuries. The porch was rebuilt in about 1720. There were restorations in 1863 and 1890. In the chancel is a 12th-century free-standing piscina. On the north arcade are medieval wall paintings. The oldest monument is dated 1671.
St Michael	Eastrington; 53.7601°N 0.7933°W		The church dates from the 11th or 12th century, with Norman features in the south porch and elsewhere. Additions and alterations were made in the 13th-15th centuries, some of which are Decorated, and others are Perpendicular. A window in the north wall of the church contains fragments of 14th-century stained glass. Also in the church are monuments dating from the 15th century.
Chapel of the Virgin and St Everilda	Everingham; 53.8693°N 0.7761°W		This is a Roman Catholic chapel built adjacent to Everingham Hall between 1836 and 1839. It was designed by Agostino Giorgioli, and its construction was supervised by John Harper of York, who also redesigned the entrance front. It is in Italianate style, and consists of a single-bay narthex, a seven-bay nave, transepts at the east end, and a single-bay apsidal sanctuary. Inside the church, the bays of the nave are separated by Corinthian columns, and each bay contains the statue of one of the twelve apostles by Luigi Bozzoni. The ceiling of the nave is a coffered tunnel vault.
St Mary	Fridaythorpe; 54.0220°N 0.6664°W		The remaining Norman features include the west tower with its south doorway, the chancel arch, and a blocked window in the chancel. There were later additions and alterations including a restoration in 1902–03 by C. Hodgson Fowler for Sir Tatton Sykes, which included rebuilding the north aisle, and adding the south porch and a vestry.
St Michael	Garton; 53.7999°N 0.0725°W		The west tower dates from the early part of the 13th century, and the chancel from later in that century. The south aisle and the south chancel chapel are from the later 14th century, and the porch is from the 15th century. Inside the church is a medieval screen with Perpendicular tracery, and a mid 13th-century octagonal font. In the south porch is a re-set medieval cross head.
St Michael	Garton on the Wolds; 54.0206°N 0.5027°W		The church was built in about 1132, with later additions and alterations. During the 19th century, work was carried out by J. Loughborough Pearson, and later by G. E. Street. On the walls of the nave and chancel are paintings executed by Clayton and Bell.
All Hallows	Goodmanham; 53.8769°N 0.6479°W		The church is said to have originated in the 7th century on a site previously occupied by a pagan temple. The present church is basically Norman, with the nave, tower and north aisle from the 12th century, the chancel from the following century, and the south porch added in the 14th century. Inside the church are two fonts, one is hexagonal, dating possibly from the 12th century, which was rescued from a farmyard in about 1850, and the other is octagonal and dated 1530.
All Saints	Halsham; 53.7307°N 0.0793°W		All Saints originated in the 12th century, with later additions and alterations. It was restored in 1869–70 by Ewan Christian. The church includes a pulpit dated 1634, and monuments from the 15th century and later.
St John of Beverley	Harpham; 54.0386°N 0.3336°W		The church is dedicated to John of Beverley who is reputed to have been born in the parish. It dates from the 12th century and has retained some Norman features. The chancel, west tower and north chapel are from the 14th century, and the east window dated 1909 is by Temple Moore. The church contains a number of monuments, the oldest dating from the 14th century.
St Martin	Hayton; 53.9039°N 0.7521°W		With a plain exterior, the interior of the church contains Norman features, some of which have been re-set. Also in the church are 17th-century wall paintings. The tower dates from the 14th century, and was heightened at a later date.
St Augustine	Hedon; 53.7415°N 0.1996°W		The church dates from the 13th century, with the tower at the crossing added in 1428. Otherwise there had been little change since, other than a restoration of the church between 1868 and 1877 by G. E. Street. The tower was restored by J. T. Webster in 1881. The font dates from the 14th century. Also in the church is a 13th-century black marble tomb cover, and the 14th-century effigy of a civilian with a sword.
All Saints	Hessle; 53.7241°N 0.4358°W		A church is recorded in the Domesday Book, but the present church dates from the 12th century, the earliest fabric being in the nave. The west steeple was built in the 15th century. In 1868–70 the church was remodelled by the Hull architect R. G. Smith; this consisted of extending the nave at the east end by two bays, widening the aisles, and demolishing and rebuilding the chancel to the east, using the original material.
All Saints	Holme-on-Spalding-Moor; 53.8403°N 0.7538°W		The nave and aisles date from the 13th century, and the upper part of the tower and the clerestory from the 15th century. The south porch was added in the 18th century. The church was restored between 1906 and 1911 by Temple Moore. Much of the architectural is Perpendicular. Inside the church are a 12th-century octagonal font, a 14th-century piscina, and screens carved by Robert (Mouseman) Thompson.
St Nicholas	Hornsea; 53.9110°N 0.1732°W		The church dates from the 13th century, with later additions and alterations. It was restored in 1865–67 by George Gilbert Scott, and further work was carried out between 1899 and 1907. The octagonal font dates from the 13th century. Also in the church are effigies, the earliest of which are a pair brought here from Nunkeeling Priory dating from the late 13th and the early 14th centuries. Built into the west wall of the porch are two small late-medieval carvings.
Howden Minster	Howden; 53.7453°N 0.8675°W		This consists of a former collegiate church with an attached grammar school and chapter house. After the Reformation the nave continued in use as a parish church, and the east end became a ruin. The church originated in about 1270–75, the tower was begun in the late 14th century, and the grammar school was added in about 1500. Restorations were carried out in the late 19th century, with alterations in 2006–11. The ruins are under the care of English Heritage.
St Mary	Huggate; 53.9881°N 0.6559°W		The nave and aisles date from the 12th century, and the chancel from the following century. Some Norman features have been retained, including the chancel arch. The tower has a recessed spire, and dates from the 14th century. The clerestory is in Perpendicular style. Restoration was carried out in 1864.
St Peter	Humbleton; 53.7956°N 0.1396°W		The nave and chancel are from the 13th century, the west tower was built in the 14th century, the aisles were added the following century, and the south porch is dated 1744. Inside the church is part of an alabaster monument to a man who died in 1637.
St Nicholas	Keyingham; 53.7111°N 0.1149°W		The church dates from the 12th-13th century, with later additions and alterations. It was restored during the 19th century, and again in 1914. The spire was removed from the west tower and its parapet was rebuilt in 1969. The oldest monument is dated 1647.
All Saints	Kilham; 54.0646°N 0.3754°W		The earliest parts of the church date from the early 12th century, and include a Norman nave and south doorway. The chancel dates from the early 14th century, and the west tower from the following century. The church was restored in 1865–66. Inside the church is a 13th-century sedilia, a Norman font, and Georgian wall tablets from the 18th century.
St Charles Borromeo	Kingston upon Hull; 53.7468°N 0.3389°W		The church opened in 1829, it was enlarged in 1835, and remodelled in 1894. It is in brick with a stuccoed entrance front, artificial stone dressings and slate roofs. The front is in Classical Revival style, it is pedimented and has a central porch with Corinthian columns and a pediment. The interior is richly decorated in a combination of Italian Baroque and Austrian Rococo styles. The three-storey presbytery, attached to the right, and the boundary walls and railings are included in the listing.
Hull Minster	Kingston upon Hull; 53.7417°N 0.3343°W		Hull Minster, formerly Holy Trinity is, by area, one of the largest parish churches in England and, when its transepts were built in the early 14th century, substantial amounts of brick were used for the first time in an English church. The church was built mainly between 1300 and 1425, with the tower added in about 1500, and vestries in the 19th and 20th centuries. Restorations were carried out by H. F. Lockwood in 1841–45, and George Gilbert Scott between 1859 and 1872. There was a further restoration in 1906 by F. S. Brodrick. On 13 May 2017, Archbishop of York John Sentamu rededicate the church as Hull Minster.
St James	Sutton-on-Hull; Kingston upon Hull; 53.7809°N 0.3046°W		The church originates from about 1347 when the nave and south aisle were built. The west tower was added in about 1400 when the aisle was extended. There have subsequently been further additions, alterations and restorations. Inside the church are a 13th-century tub font, and a chest tomb dating from about 1349.
All Saints	Kirby Underdale; 54.0170°N 0.7677°W		The west tower and nave are Norman, dating from the 11th century, and the arcades are from the following century. A vestry was added to the south of the tower in 1828. G. E. Street completely rebuilt the chancel in 1870–71, and added a south porch. A Roman sculpture of Mercury has been incorporated into the west end of the north aisle, and there are fragments of medieval graveslabs elsewhere in the walls.
St Mary	Kirkburn; 53.9824°N 0.5076°W		St Mary's was built in the middle of the 12th century and retains many Norman features, particularly in its tower and chancel. The chancel was partly rebuilt in 1818, and the church was restored in 1856–57 by J.Loughborough Pearson for Sir Tatton Sykes, 4th Baronet. Inside the church is a Norman font, and two items designed by George Edmund Street, the chancel screen, and the marble reredos.
St Andrew	Kirk Ella; 53.7539°N 0.4541°W		The chancel dates from the early 13th century, and the west tower, in contrasting white Magnesian Limestone, was built between 1450 and 1454. Its dark pinnacles were added in the 1882–83. There was much rebuilding elsewhere during the 19th century, including the nave, porch, and south chancel chapel. Inside the church, under the tower, are the rare remains of a Decorated screen from the early 14th century. There are also numerous monuments from the 18th and 19th centuries.
St Peter	Langtoft; 54.0892°N 0.4600°W		The west tower and south arcade date from the 13th century, and the chancel and north aisle from the following century. In 1900–03 the church was restored, and the north aisle were added, by C. Hodgson Fowler Inside the church is a 12th-century font removed from a local church that has been demolished.
St Catherine	Leconfield; 53.8801°N 0.4573°W		A church with a nave dating from the 12th century or earlier, the aisles from the early 13th century, and the chancel from later that century. The west tower and south porch are from the 16th century. Some of the windows contain stained glass from the 14th and 15th centuries.
St Mary	Lockington; 53.9083°N 0.4836°W		The church dates from the 12th century, with later additions and alterations. The 13th-century west tower was rebuilt in the 17th century. The 18th-century pulpit has a reader's desk and a sounding board. The south chapel was remodelled in 1634–35; its walls are lined with 173 panels, each of which contains a coat of arms connected with the Estoft family.
All Saints	Londesborough; 53.8974°N 0.6796°W		The south doorway is Norman with a sundial in its tympanum. Incorporated in the wall above the doorway is a cross-head dating from the late 9th or early 10th century. Elsewhere the architecture is in Early English or Perpendicular style. In the church are monuments to the Earls of Burlington, including one to the architect Richard Boyle, the 3rd Earl.
All Saints	Low Catton; 53.9772°N 0.9269°W		The church dates from the 12th century, and there are remaining Norman features in the north transept. The aisles were added in the 13th century, and the southwest tower in the 15th century. In 1866 G. E. Street largely rebuilt the chancel, whose roof is much higher than that of the nave. The east window was designed by Edward Burne-Jones and made by Morris & Co.
All Saints	Market Weighton; 53.8649°N 0.6670°W		The oldest fabric is in the nave and dates from the 11th century. The chancel and lower part of the tower are from the 13th century, and the aisles from the 14th century. The lower part of the tower is in stone and the upper part, heightened in 1785, is in brick. The church was restored in 1870–72. The Norman font dates from the 11th or 12th century.
St Margaret	Millington; 53.9562°N 0.7362°W		St Margaret's is a small church consisting of a 12th-century nave, a 14th—century chancel, and a 19th-century west bellcote and porch. The south doorway is Norman. Inside the church is a west gallery, and altar rails carved by Robert (Mouseman) Thompson.
All Saints	Nafferton; 54.0163°N 0.3906°W		The nave was built in the 12th century, and has a Norman chancel arch. The chancel itself dates from the late 13th century, the aisles from the 14th and 15th centuries, and the west tower from the 15th century. Porches were added during the 19th century. To the south of the chancel arch is a squint. The font consists of a tub with lozenge and cable decoration. All the pews are 19th-century box pews.
St Nicholas	Newbald; 53.8175°N 0.6165°W		This cruciform, aisleless church is considered to be the most complete Norman church in the East Riding, with four Norman arches at the crossing. It dates from about 1140. The belfry stage was added to the tower in the 13th century, and the chancel and north vestry in the 15th century. There were four restorations during the 19th century. The 12th-century tub font stands on eight columns, and is carved with foliage.
All Saints	North Cave; 53.7832°N 0.6405°W		The base of the tower is Norman, dating from the 12th century. The nave and chancel are from the following century, and the Perpendicular clerestory and upper part of the tower were added in the 15th century. The porch is dated 1753. The church was restored in 1892 by Smith and Broderick. On the south wall of the chancel is a painted rubric for the Confession and Absolution.
St James	Nunburnholme; 53.9194°N 0.7107°W		The nave dates from the 12th century, and the chancel from the early part of the following century. A restoration was carried out in 1872–73. The west tower and south porch were added in about 1902 by Temple Moore. Inside the church is a 12th-century font. Under the tower are two fragments of a cross-shaft dating from about 1000.
St Wilfrid	Ottringham; 53.7009°N 0.0811°W		The church dates from the 12th century, with later additions, alterations and restorations. It has a west tower with a recessed broach spire. The octagonal font dates from the 15th century, and the church contains a full set of 18th-century box pews.
St Patrick	Patrington; 53.6828°N 0.0097°W		This church with a cruciform plan dates mainly from the 14th century, with a spire added to its central tower in the 15th century. The fabric of the church incorporates masonry from the 12th-13th century. In the chancel are a sedilia, a piscina and an Easter Sepulchre.
St Andrew	Paull; 53.7149°N 0.2251°W		The church replaces an earlier church on a different site that was destroyed in 1355, and it incorporates material from the earlier church. This church was damaged in the Siege of Hull in 1643. It was repaired in 1663, and again in about 1700, and restored in 1879 by J. T. Webster. All the windows contain Perpendicular tracery. The earliest monuments date from the 15th century.
All Saints	Pocklington; 53.9307°N 0.7796°W		The nave dates from the 12th century or earlier. The transepts were added in the 13th century, the west tower and the chancel were built in the 15th century, and the porch was rebuilt in the 19th century, re-using older materials. The font dates from the 12th century, and is set on a 19th-century base. Inside the church are two monuments dating from the 16th century.
All Saints	Preston; 53.7583°N 0.2009°W		The chancel dates from the 13th century, and was rebuilt in 1870. Other parts of the church date from the 14th to the 16th century. The west tower is Perpendicular. The church was restored in 1878–82 by Smith and Broderick. The octagonal font dates from the 15th century.
All Saints	Roos; 53.7469°N 0.0442°W		The chancel dates from the 13th century, and the nave from the following century. The west tower was built in the 14th century, and raised during the next century. The porch was added in 1842 when the church was restored by L. N. Cottingham. An organ chamber by F. S. Brodrick was built in 1881. There are fragments of medieval stained glass in the clerestory windows.
All Saints	Rudston; 54.0938°N 0.3229°W		The west tower and tower arch are Norman dating from the 12th century. The aisles and chancel were built in the 13th century, and the porch in the 19th century. The church was restored in 1861 by G. Fowler Jones. Inside the church are a 12th-century font and a 14th-century piscina and sedilia. Also in the church is a memorial to the author Winifred Holtby, who died in 1935, and who is buried in the churchyard.
St Leonard	Scorborough; 53.8942°N 0.4558°W		Built in 1857–59 for Lord Hotham and designed by John L. Pearson in Gothic Revival style.
All Saints	Shiptonthorpe; 53.8776°N 0.7050°W		The nave dates from the 12th century. The west tower, the north aisle and the chancel, with its north chapel, are from the 13th century. The tower was heightened in the 15th century. The church was restored in 1883 by James Demaine.
St Helen	Skeffling; 53.6500°N 0.0724°E		All the church, apart from the 19th-century south porch, dates from the 1460s. It was restored in 1901. In the chancel are three plain sedilia. The font dates from the 15th century, and the oldest monument in the church dates from 1494.
St Leonard	Skerne; 53.9815°N 0.4056°W		This is a small church with the nave and chancel dating from the 12th century. The chancel arch, the south doorway, a blocked south window in the nave, and a north window in the chancel are all in Norman in style. The tower was added in the 15th century, and the vestry and south porch in the 19th century. Inside the church are effigies dating from the mid-14th century.
All Saints	Skipsea; 53.9777°N 0.2243°W		The nave and chancel were built in the 11th century, with the tower aisles and clerestory added in the 15th century. In about 1856–60 James Fowler carried out a restoration, adding a south porch, a north vestry, and rebuilding the arcades. Much of the church is in Perpendicular style, the nave and aisles having embattled parapets.
St Augustine	Skirlaugh; 53.8411°N 0.2663°W		The church was built between 1401 and 1405, replacing an earlier church on the site. It was paid for by the Rt Revd Walter Skirlaw, who was born in the parish and became Bishop of Durham. It is entirely Perpendicular in style. The church was restored by William Botterill and Son in 1878, and further alterations were made in the 1980s.
St Lawrence	Snaith; 53.6921°N 1.0308°W		This church is an Anglo-Saxon foundation, but the present church dates from 1086. There have been additions and alterations since, including a 13th-century tower and a 14th-century chancel. It was restored in 1867–68, and repaired in 1883 and 1910. To the north of the tower is a former consistory court. Also in the church is a monument to the 5th Viscount Downe of 1837 by Francis Chantrey.
St Mary	South Dalton; 53.8972°N 0.5295°W		A new church designed by John L. Pearson in Gothic Revival style. It was built in 1858–61 for the 3rd Lord Hotham. The church has a prominent steeple 208 feet (63 m) high. All the internal fittings were designed by Pearson.
St Mary	Swine; 53.8063°N 0.2791°W		Originally this was the eastern part of the nun's church at a Cistercian nunnery dating from about 1180. It was altered in the 14th and 15th centuries. In 1787 the west tower was rebuilt, and a porch and vestry were added in the 19th century. Inside the church are choir stalls with misericords, and monuments dating back to the 14th century.
St Michael and All Angels	Sutton upon Derwent; 53.9171°N 0.9269°W		The nave dates from the 12th century, and the chancel from the following century. The west tower was built in the 15th century, and the south porch followed in the 15th–16th century. Inside the church is a re-set 12th-century round arch, and fragments of an 11th-century carved cross.
All Saints	Thwing; 54.1171°N 0.3966°W		The church dates from the 12th century, with a Norman south doorway and chancel arch. Much of the rest of the church is Perpendicular. It was restored in 1898–1901 by Temple Moore who rebuilt parts of the church. Inside the church is a Norman font, and monuments dating from the 14th century and later.
St Mary	Watton; 53.9336°N 0.4449°W		St Mary's is a brick church built in the 15th century, and incorporating fabric from the 13th century. Alterations and additions were made in the 19th century, and a parapet was added to the west tower in the 20th century. Inside the church is a rood screen, and there is a piscina in the south wall of the nave.
St Peter	Wawne; 53.8162°N 0.3442°W		The nave dates from the 12th century, or earlier, the tower and aisles from the early 13th century, and the chancel from the later part of that century. It is constructed in stone, with repairs in brick.
St Mary	Welwick; 53.6693°N 0.0291°E		The oldest parts of the church are the tower arch, the eastern part of the nave and the western part of the chancel, which date from the late 13th century. Additions were made during the following century, and the tower was rebuilt in the 15th century. Restorations were carried out in the early 20th century and in about 1980. In the south aisle is an elaborate tomb dating from about 1340. It contains the effigy of a priest wearing the vestments of the Mass, surrounded by four angels. This lies under an ogee arch, and the grave slab is carved with the symbols of the Four Evangelists. On the walls of the nave are traces of wall paintings.
St Germain	Winestead; 53.6940°N 0.0346°W		The church has been altered and extended through the centuries, including a restoration and alterations by Temple Moore in 1888–90. It is built in a variety of materials, including cobbles, limestone and red brick, with stone dressings, and has roofs of pantile and lead. The church consists of a two-bay nave, a south aisle, a north porch, and a single-bay chancel with a single-bay south chapel. A length of Norman corbel table is built into the south chancel wall.
