= St Patrick's Church, Patrington =

Anglican parish church in Patrington, East Riding of Yorkshire, England

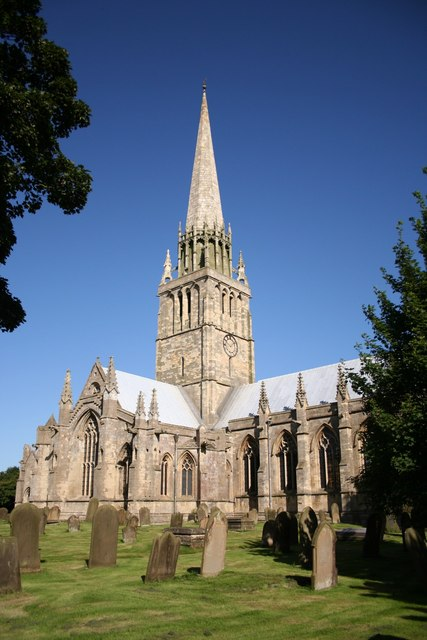
- St Patrick's Church, Patrington

- Location within the East Riding of Yorkshire
- 53°40′58″N 00°00′34″W
- OS grid reference: TA 31554 22541
- Location: Patrington
- Country: England
- Denomination: Church of England
- Churchmanship: Broad Church
- Website: stpatrickspatrington.org.uk

History
- Dedication: St Patrick

Architecture
- Heritage designation: Grade I listed

Administration
- Province: York
- Diocese: York
- Archdeaconry: East Riding
- Deanery: Holderness (South)
- Parish: Patrington

St Patrick's Church, Patrington is an Anglican parish church located in Patrington, East Riding of Yorkshire, England. The church is a Grade I listed building.

== History ==
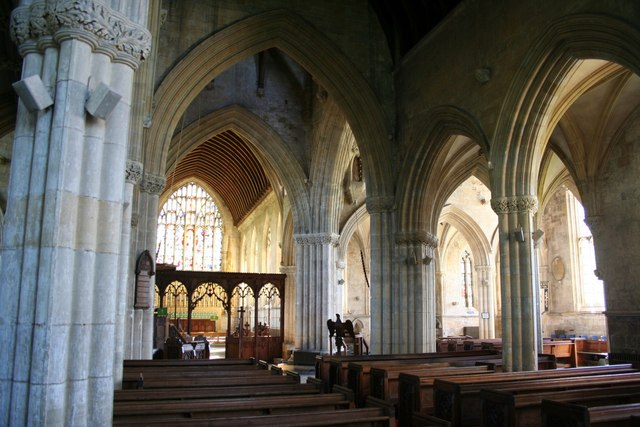
Chancel, crossing, and south transept from nave

The church, an extensive edifice, situated in the centre of the village, is the handsomest in Holderness. It is dedicated to St Patrick, and is valued in the Liber Regis at £22 (around £7,700,000 in today's money). Patron, the master and fellows of Clare hall, Cambridge.

The manor of Patrington was held from 1033 to 1545 by the Archbishops of York, who were granted a charter for a market in 1223. It was a wealthy manor, including a minor port on the Humber and remaining the market town for South Holderness until the later 19th century. It was this wealth that funded the complete rebuilding of the parish church in a relatively short time, giving it a unity and quality much admired by architectural historians and church visitors such as Nikolaus Pevsner and Simon Jenkins. The church is often referred to as ‘The Queen of Holderness’. It is cruciform, 150 feet in length, and consists of a four-bay aisled nave, two-bay aisled transepts, a four-bay aisle-less chancel, and a crossing tower with a spire reaching 175 feet (53 m) high.

Fragments of earlier churches on the site remain; e.g., pieces of Norman masonry in the nave walls, a few early 13th century pier bases, and later 13th century work in the lower parts of the south transept. Evidence in the bases of the nave arcades, the west responds, and the lower parts of the crossing piers indicates a major reconstruction which was begun c. 1280, but probably did not go far.

The present building was begun c. 1300, the work commencing with the south transept. This was completed by about 1310, and work turned to the north transept, completed by about 1320. The crossing tower was built next, then the nave arcades from c. 1320-40. The 1340s saw the construction of the nave aisle walls and the chancel. This meant the near-completion of the church as it is today: only the east window and the spire remained to be built. But these had to wait, for work ceased in the late 1340s, as in so many cases across England, because of the Black Death. They would be in place by 1400.

== Architecture and fittings ==
The church is thus uniformly of the Decorated style, other than the two exceptions just discussed. The tracery of the earliest windows, those of the transept fronts, has left the simple geometrical forms behind but is not yet flowing: it instead consists of foiled spherical triangles (encircled in the larger windows) and unencircled pointed quatrefoils. The north transept front has a small doorway with a stone roof. A Lady Chapel in the form of a shallow three-sided apse projects from the centre of the east wall of the south transept. The nave has a south and a north porch, and flowing tracery in the three-light aisle windows. The five-light great west window also has flowing tracery, though inaccurately restored in 1885. The aisle-less chancel has four large windows on each side, reticulated forms alternating with flowing forms of Lincolnshire type. The great east window, blank below the central transom, is most emphatically Perpendicular. Pinnacled buttresses are employed throughout, those of the transepts being provided with niches and full-length grotesques. The apex of each gable carries a cross. The crossing tower is of three stages, the lower stage (corresponding to the roofs) blank, the second with only very thin single lancets, and the upper with four large blank arches filling each side. From this rises a Perpendicular spire embraced at its base by an arcaded octagonal screen, tied by thin flying buttresses to corner pinnacles on the tower. Jenkins praises this as ‘a device of great delicacy’, and the whole composition as perfect in proportion with the nave and transepts. Pevsner calls the spire ‘one of the finest in the country, not at all showy, but wonderfully satisfying’.

The interior is as unified as the exterior. Clustered piers rise to foliate capitals, the foliage more stylized here than on the naturalistic capitals of several decades before. The arches have the complicated mouldings typical of the period. The aisles of the south transept and nave are all vaulted in stone. Only the vault of the east aisle of the south transept is original. The rest of the roofs consist of thin and closely spaced arched brace trusses forming pointed arches, very simple and harmonious. These are original, though the chancel roof has been restored. The Lady Chapel in the form of a small apse in the south transept aisle has an original structural stone reredos, its own stone vault, and a very fine late 13th century statue of the Virgin and Child. (This statue, relocated from the exterior below the east window, has been 'linked stylistically' by Pevsner to a similar statue over the south door of St Mary's Church, Welwick, and attributed to a school of Beverley masons who produced numerous sculptures and monuments in the area, including the famous Percy tomb in Beverley Minster.) An extra bay between the crossing and the chancel arch, corresponding to the transept aisles, adds a surprisingly satisfying depth to the composition. In the chancel are sedilia and piscina with low ogee gables and much crocketing, opposite a stone Easter Sepulchre in the same spirit. A most unusual feature is the tower stairway in the south transept, which emerges into the open through doorways above both the east and west arcades. It ascends both sides of the crossing arch, the steps forming a bold zigzag pattern, and continues up through a door above the apex of the arch. The corbels supporting the stairs are richly carved.

The font is positioned centrally at the west end of the church. It is Decorated, twelve-sided, ornately carved with crocketed gables. Pevsner states that two of the benches at the western end are 17th century; the rest presumably are modern. The pulpit, heavily restored, is dated 1612. The chancel screen is of the late 14th century. A large reredos of gilded oak with twelve Northumbrian saints and the Virgin fills the space below the east window. It is of 1936 by J. Harold Gibbons.

== Parish status ==
The church is part of a group of parishes which includes:

- St Nicholas' Church, Keyingham
- St Wilfrid's Church, Ottringham
- St Germain's Church, Winestead
- St Mary's Church, Welwick
- All Saints' Church, Easington with St Helen's Church, Skeffling

== Monuments ==
- John Duncalfe, 1637. North wall
- Mrs Emot Shaw, 1652. South wall
- Elizabeth and John Featherstone, 1796 and 1802
- Mary Robinson, 1763. South aisle
- Mary French, 1782. South aisle
- Robert Robinson, 1783. South aisle
- Mary Pearson, 1800. North aisle
- George French, 1802. North wall
- Susanna and John Featherstone, 1804 and 1805

== Organ ==
The organ was built by Forster and Andrews in 1891. A specification of the organ can be found on the National Pipe Organ Register.

== Bells ==
The peal of 8 bells contains 2 from 1948 and 3 from 1906 by John Taylor of Loughborough. The largest three are a bell of 1674 by George Oldfield, a bell of 1570 from Nottingham and the tenor of 1846 by John Taylor.

== See also ==
- Grade I listed churches in the East Riding of Yorkshire
- Listed buildings in Patrington
