= Weeton =

Weeton is the name of various locations in England:

- Weeton, East Riding of Yorkshire
- Weeton-with-Preese, Lancashire
- Weeton, North Yorkshire
