= Patrington Mill =

Mill in Patrington, East Riding of Yorkshire, England, UK

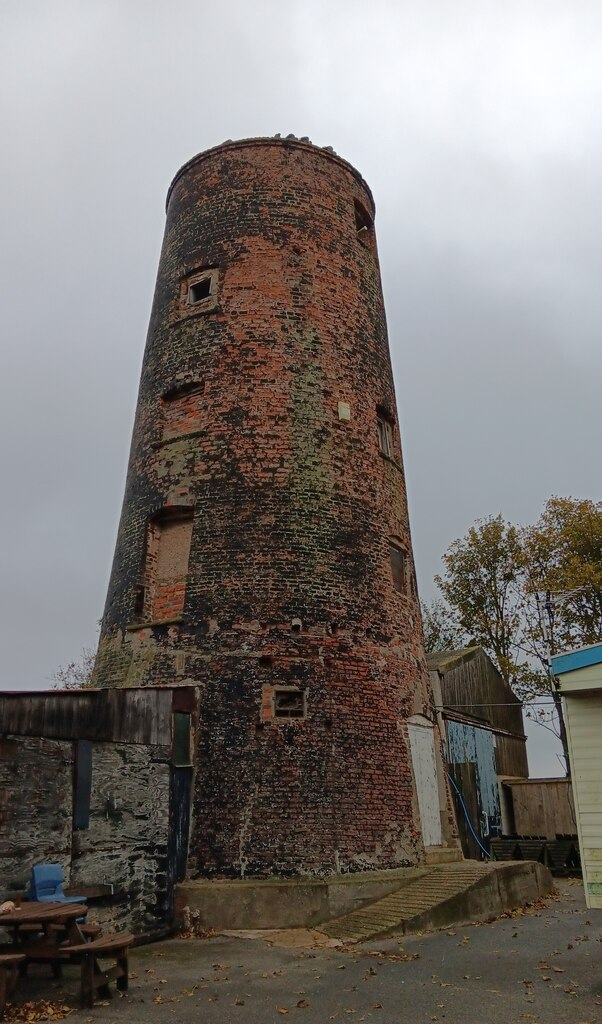
The mill, in 2025

Patrington Mill, formerly also known as East Mill, is a historic windmill in Patrington, a village in the East Riding of Yorkshire, in England.

The mill was built around 1800. A plaque on the first floor, reading "OPPERS. T. ROWNTREE. P. MILLERS. JE. 27. 1840", commemorates later owners. It operated as a windmill until about 1940, then machines were installed and occasionally used to grind corn for several decades. The building was grade II listed in 1987.

The former tower windmill is in tarred red brick, and consists of a tapering round tower with five storeys. It contains two doorways, a blocked door on the first floor, and windows, some blocked, all with segmental heads.

== See also ==
- Listed buildings in Patrington
