= John Hawley (footballer) =

English footballer and coach

Personal information
- Full name: John East Hawley
- Date of birth: 8 May 1954 (age 72)
- Place of birth: Patrington, England
- Height: 1.82 m (5 ft 11 1/2 in)
- Position: Forward

Senior career*
Years	Team	Apps	(Gls)
1972–1978	Hull City	114	(22)
1975–1976	→ St. Louis Stars (loan)	20	(11)
1978–1979	Leeds United	33	(16)
1979–1981	Sunderland	25	(11)
1981–1983	Arsenal	20	(3)
1982	→ Leyton Orient (loan)	4	(1)
1982	→ Hull City (loan)	3	(1)
1983	Happy Valley	16	(4)
1983–1985	Bradford City	67	(28)
1985–1986	Scunthorpe United	21	(7)
Total		323	(104)
- * Club domestic league appearances and goals

John East Hawley (born 8 May 1954) is an English former professional footballer and coach who played as a forward. Hawley played for several English clubs: Hull City, Leeds United, Arsenal, Sunderland, Leyton Orient, Bradford City, and Scunthorpe United. He also played for NASL's St. Louis Stars.

At the end of his playing days, Hawley went on to work as a coach in the Nottingham Forest academy.

== Career ==
Born in Patrington, East Riding of Yorkshire, Hawley first played as a professional footballer in 1972, for Hull City. He was loaned for the 1975–76 season to the St. Louis Stars, rejoining Hull at that season's end. In 1978, Hawley made the switch for £81,000 to local rivals, Leeds United. Hawley was the Whites' top scorer, scoring 16 goals in 33 appearances. He left in the summer of 1979 for Sunderland, for £200,000.

In 1981, he moved to Arsenal for £51,000, where he made 23 appearances, scoring three times. Whilst on Arsenal's books, Hawley was loaned to Leyton Orient and Hull City. He left Arsenal in 1983 for Valley Parade, where he helped Bradford City win the 1984–85 Third Division title. He left Bradford to join Scunthorpe United, with whom he brought his career to a conclusion.

After he retired, Hawley firstly worked in his family's antique business, and then as a coach within the Nottingham Forest academy.

== Personal life ==
While playing for Bradford City, he was involved with rescue efforts during the Bradford City stadium fire. He has been credited with saving the life of a supporter by pulling him to safety.

As of 2014 he was running an auctioneering business in East Yorkshire. He is married to Caroline Hawley, an auctioneer and Bargain Hunt presenter.

== Honours ==
Bradford City

- Football League Third Division: 1984–85
