= Listed buildings in Skeffling =

Skeffling is a civil parish in the county of the East Riding of Yorkshire, England. It contains five listed buildings that are recorded in the National Heritage List for England. Of these, one is listed at Grade I, the highest of the three grades, and the others are at Grade II, the lowest grade. The parish contains the village of Skeffling and the surrounding area. All the listed buildings are in the village, and consist of a church, a cross in the churchyard, a manor house, a farmhouse and farm buildings.

== Key ==
Grade	Criteria
I	Buildings of exceptional interest, sometimes considered to be internationally important
II	Buildings of national importance and special interest

== Buildings ==
Name and location	Photograph	Date	Notes	Grade
Churchyard cross 53.65000°N 0.07243°E		14th or 15th century	The cross is in the churchyard of St Helen's Church, to the south of the church. It is in limestone, and about 1.6 metres (5 ft 3 in) in height. The cross consists of the stump of a tapered shaft, on an octagonal drum pedestal with a square base. On the top is a later inscribed brass sundial.	II
St Helen's Church; 53.65000°N 0.07243°E		1460s	The church has been altered and extended through the centuries, including a restoration in 1901. It is built in cobbles with limestone dressings, the nave has a sandstone parapet, and the porch is in red brick. The porch has a pantile roof, and the rest of the roof is in lead. The church consists of a nave with a clerestory, north and south aisles, a south porch, a chancel and a west tower. The tower has two stages, a moulded plinth, diagonal buttresses, quoins to the top section, a three-light west window with Perpendicular tracery, a four-centred arched head, and a hood mould, slit windows, moulded string courses, two-light bell openings with trefoil heads and incised spandrels under a four-centred arched head, and a coped embattled parapet with truncated pinnacles.	I
Old Hall; 53.65603°N 0.07223°E	—	1717	A manor house, also known as Skeffling Hall, it is in red brick, with painted brick dressings, the main block with a pantile roof, and the rear wing with a slate roof. There are two storeys. The main front has a doorway with a moulded surround and a pulvinated hood, and the windows are sashes with painted lintels. Above them is a painted band, and a tall parapet with moulded stone coping. On the west front is a slightly projecting porch.	II
Barn, stable and granary 53.65481°N 0.07134°E	—	Mid-18th century	The farm buildings are to the northwest of Bleak House Farmhouse. The barn is in cobbles with brick dressings and quoins, and the later stable with granary is in brick. They have a pantile roof with tumbled-in brick to the raised gables. The buildings form a rectangular plan with two storeys, the barn with four bays, and the rest with one. They contain doorways, windows and vents.	II
Wilberforce Farmhouse; 53.65065°N 0.07515°E		Late 18th to early 19th century	The farmhouse is in colourwashed brick, with stepped eaves, and a pantile roof with tumbled-in brick to the raised gables. There are two storeys, three bays, and a single-bay extension to the left with one storey and an attic. The doorway has a fanlight, and a cornice and hood on scrolled consoles. The windows are sashes, on the ground floor under stucco flat arches, and those on the upper floor have architraves.	II
