= Henry Maister (cricketer) =

English cricketer

Personal information
- Full name: Henry Maister
- Born: 27 July 1813; Winestead, Yorkshire, England
- Died: 18 June 1898 (aged 84); Skefflington, Yorkshire, England
- Batting: Unknown

Domestic team information
- Years: Team
- 1832: Marylebone Cricket Club

Career statistics
| Competition | First-class |
|---|---|
| Matches | 2 |
| Runs scored | 9 |
| Batting average | 3.00 |
| 100s/50s | –/– |
| Top score | 4* |
| Catches/stumpings | 1/– |
- Source: Cricinfo, 4 August 2019

Henry Maister (27 July 1813 – 18 June 1898) was an English first-class cricketer.

Maister was born at Winestead, a village in the East Riding of Yorkshire long associated with the Maister family. He was educated at Winchester College, before going up to Balliol College, Oxford. He made two appearances in first-class cricket in 1832, the first coming for the Marylebone Cricket Club against the Gentlemen of Kent in August, with his second match coming for the Gentlemen of England the following month against the Gentlemen of Kent, with both matches played at Chislehurst. After graduating from Oxford he became a reverend and married Grace Sutton in June 1850 at Elton, County Durham. He died in June 1898 at Skefflington, Yorkshire.
