= White Hall, Winestead =

Historic building in Winestead

White Hall, also known as Whitehall, is a historic building in Winestead, a village in the East Riding of Yorkshire, in England.

The small country house was built between 1814 and 1815 for Arthur Maister, replacing his existing house on the site. It is believed to have been designed by John Nash, and possibly altered later by Charles Mountain. Historic England describes it as "a well-designed house with good details". The building was grade II* listed in 1966. In the 21st century, it operates as a wedding venue.

The house is built of yellow-grey brick, with dressings in sandstone and yellow brick, hipped Westmorland slate roofs, and two storeys. The west front has three bays, and a recessed centre with a projecting Greek Doric sandstone portico with paired fluted columns, a plain entablature, and a moulded cornice and blocking course. The doorway has an architrave, a panelled surround, and an entablature, with a plain frieze, and a moulded cornice on consoles with shell ornament. The east front has six bays, the middle two bays projecting under pediments. The south front has a central full-height bow window. The windows on all fronts are sashes. To the north are two service wings forming a rear courtyard.

Inside, the house has been little altered, and retains its original staircase, white marble flooring, extensive panelling, chimneypieces, and fitted bookcases in the library. The library has wallpaper from around 1870.

== See also ==
- Grade II* listed buildings in the East Riding of Yorkshire
- Listed buildings in Patrington
