= Listed buildings in Patrington =

Patrington is a civil parish in the county of the East Riding of Yorkshire, England. It contains 38 listed buildings that are recorded in the National Heritage List for England. Of these, two are listed at Grade I, the highest of the three grades, one is at Grade II*, the middle grade, and the others are at Grade II, the lowest grade. The parish contains the villages of Patrington and Winestead, the hamlet of Patrington Haven, and the surrounding countryside. Most of the listed buildings are houses, cottages, farmhouses and associated structures. The parish contains Enholmes Farm, a model farm, and most of the farm buildings are listed. The other listed buildings include two churches, a column base in a churchyard, a public house, a former windmill, a milestone, a row of almshouses, and two war memorials.

== Key ==
Grade	Criteria
I	Buildings of exceptional interest, sometimes considered to be internationally important
II*	Particularly important buildings of more than special interest
II	Buildings of national importance and special interest

== Buildings ==
Name and location	Photograph	Date	Notes	Grade
St Germain's Church, Winestead; 53.69404°N 0.03461°W		12th century	The church has been altered and extended through the centuries, including a restoration and alterations by Temple Moore in 1888–90. It is built in a variety of materials, including cobbles, limestone and red brick, with stone dressings, and has roofs of pantile and lead. The church consists of a two-bay nave, a south aisle, a north porch, and a single-bay chancel with a single-bay south chapel. A length of Norman corbel table is built into the south chancel wall.	I
St Patrick's Church; 53.68281°N 0.00960°W		Early 14th century	The church, which incorporates earlier material, has been altered and extended through the centuries. It is built in limestone, mainly with lead roofs, and with some flagstone roofs. The church has a cruciform plan, consisting of a nave, north and south aisles, north and south porches, north and south transepts with aisles, the south transept with a Lady Chapel, a chancel with a north sacristy, and a steeple at the crossing. The steeple has a tower with three stages, angle buttresses, moulded string courses, lancet windows and clock faces. The top stage has blind arcades containing square-headed bell openings, over which are gargoyles and a coped parapet. On this are crocketed angle pinnacles with flying buttresses carrying an octagonal corona screen and an octagonal spire with a ball finial and a weathercock.	I
Column base 53.69384°N 0.03447°W	—	14th century	The column base is in the churchyard of St Germain's Church, Winestead, to the south of the church. It consists of the base of an octagonal column on a square base, with the top hollowed out, and is about 30 centimetres (12 in) in height.	II
Southside Farmhouse; 53.68134°N 0.01450°W		Late 17th century	The farmhouse is in red brick on a high moulded plinth, with boxed eaves, and a pantile roof with brick coped gables, tumbled-in brick, and brick kneelers. There are two storeys and attics, and an L-shaped plan, with a front range of three bays, a rear wing and an outshut in the angle. The central doorway has an architrave, a blocked fanlight, and a flat brick arch. The windows are sashes in architraves, those on the ground floor under cambered brick arches. Above the doorway is a reset datestone. On the right return is a casement window and two horizontal sliding sashes.	II
The Old Rectory and coach house 53.69772°N 0.03367°W	—	1728	The house is mainly in red brick, with brown brick on the northwest wing, a dentilled brick eaves cornice, and a pantile roof with tumbled-in brick to the raised gables. There are two storeys and attics, and an approximately U-shaped plan, with a front range of five bays, the outer bays projecting and containing canted bay windows. The central doorway has a shouldered architrave, a stepped keystone containing a crest, a pulvinated frieze and a dentilled pediment, over which is a datestone. The windows are sashes with flat rubbed brick arches, and keystones inscribed with a monogram and a date. The coach house, recessed on the right, has a single storey and an attic and three bays, and a single-storey rear wing. It contains a central carriage entrance, doorways and a horizontally sliding sash window, all under segmental arches.	II
Former Holderness Inn; 53.68371°N 0.01082°W		Early 18th century	The public house is in stuccoed and incised brick, with a moulded wooden eaves board, and a double-span pantile roof. There are two storeys and attics, and five bays. In the centre is a recessed doorway with an architrave and a fanlight under a channelled flat arch, flanked by narrow side windows in architraves. Outside these are two canted bay windows to the left and one to the right. The upper floor contains sash windows in architraves under channelled stucco flat arches.	II
Keeper's Cottage and garden walls 53.71221°N 0.03354°W	—	Early to mid-18th century	The cottage is in brick, and has a pantile roof with tumbled-in brick to the raised gables. There is a single storey with an attic, and two bays. The doorway has a segmental head, to the right is a basket-arched sash window under an oak lintel, to the left is a window under an inserted lintel in a blocked arch, and on the gables are attic windows. The garden walls are in brick, with coping in brick and stone, and enclose two rectangular gardens. On each side are projecting gateways with doors under segmental arches with moulded stone cornices, and the walls contain projecting square piers.	II
House behind The Burn's Head Inn; 53.67081°N 0.02499°W	—	Early to mid-18th century	The house is in brick on a plinth, with stepped eaves, and a pantile roof with brick coped gables and tumbled-in brick. There are two storeys and an attic, and three bays. The openings, some of which are blocked, include sash windows, and are under segmental arches.	II
The Manor House; 53.68421°N 0.01295°W		1743	The house is in red brick, and has a pantile roof with stone coped and brick tumbled-in gables. There are two storeys and four bays, and a lower bay to the left. The doorway has a moulded hood on ornate carved wooden consoles, and above it is a stone tablet with a moulded surround inscribed with a name and the date. The windows are sashes in wooden architraves.	II
Elmtree Farmhouse; 53.68386°N 0.00734°W	—	1750	The south front was added to the farmhouse later in the 18th century. The house is in colourwashed brick, with stepped eaves and a pantile roof with tumbled-in brick to the right gable. There are two storeys and an L-shaped plan. The south front has three bays, and contains a central doorway with a fanlight in an architrave under a rubbed brick flat arch with a raised stone keystone. To its right is a canted bay window, to the left is a door under a flat stucco arch, and on the upper floor are sash windows. On the right is a central doorway and casement windows, all with segmental heads. On the rear wing is an initialled datestone.	II
North House; 53.68467°N 0.01110°W	—	Mid-18th century	The house, later divided into two, is in red brick, rendered and incised on the front, with a pantile roof and tumbled-in brick to the raised gables. There are two storeys and an attic, a front of three bays, and a lower two-storey single-bay to the right. The central doorway on the main block has pilasters, a fanlight and a bracketed cornice, flanked by canted bay windows with a bracketed cornice. On the upper floor are sash windows in architraves under stucco flat arches. On the right wing is a similar doorway and sash windows.	II
Wyke House; 53.68209°N 0.01230°W	—	Mid-18th century	The house is in red brick, with a wooden eaves board, a bracketed gutter, and a tile roof with stone coped gables and tumbled-in brick. There are two storeys and four bays. The central doorway has panelled and fluted pilasters, an entablature, a fanlight in panelled reveals, a dentilled cornice and a hood. The windows are sashes in architraves, those on the ground floor with stucco flat arches and keystones, and on the upper floor with painted rubbed brick flat arches.	II
Former stable block, Winestead Hall; 53.71359°N 0.03534°W	—	1762	The stable block, later used for other purposes, to a hall that has been demolished, is in red brick on a plinth, with a moulded wooden cornice, and a hipped Westmorland slate roof. There is a single storey and attics, a U-shaped plan, and a front of seven bays, the second and sixth bays projecting under pediments. The entrance is in the centre, and the windows are sashes. On the roof is a two-stage wooden clock tower, the lower stage square with recessed half-columns on the corners, a clock face, moulded segmental pediments and a domed roof, on which is circular belfry with a colonnade, a frieze, a bell-shaped lead roof, with a ball finial, and a wrought iron weathervane with a gilded weathercock.	II
17 Westgate; 53.68369°N 0.01470°W		Mid to late 18th century	The house is in brown brick, with a wooden eaves board, and a pantile roof with a rendered raised gable on the left. There are two storeys and five bays. The doorway has a fanlight in an architrave, and a cornice under a stuccoed flat arch. The windows are sashes, most in architraves under stuccoed flat arches.	II
Green Farmhouse and left range 53.68401°N 0.01419°W		Mid to late 18th century	The farmhouse and stable with a granary range to the left are in red brick, colourwashed on the front, rendered on the gabled ends, with pantile roofs. The house has stepped eaves, a wooden eaves board, stone coped gables, and a shaped kneeler on the right. There are two storeys and three bays. The central doorway has a fanlight, and the windows are sashes, all in architraves, and under segmental stretcher arches. The left range projects, and has a single storey and attics, and two bays. It contains a sash window, a casement window in a blocked basket-arched opening, two vents, and two blocked hatches in the attic.	II
Rose Cottage and the Old Post Office; 53.70531°N 0.03249°W		Mid to late 18th century	A farmhouse, later two houses, in red brick, partly colourwashed, with a moulded wooden eaves board, and a pantile roof with tumbled-in brick to the raised gables. There are two storeys and attics, six bays, and rear wings. The Old Post Office, on the left, has a central doorway with panelled pilasters, partly reeded, an ornamental entablature, a radial fanlight a moulded cornice and a dentilled open pediment. Rose Cottage has a timber porch in the right bay, and both cottages have sash windows in architraves. There is a horizontally sliding sash window on the right gable, and a casement window on the left gable.	II
Winestead Grange Farmhouse; 53.69814°N 0.03230°W	—	Mid to late 18th century	The farmhouse is in red brick, with a stepped and cogged brick eaves cornice, a moulded gutter, and a pantile roof with tumbled-in brick to the raised gables. There are two storeys and an attic and an L-shaped plan, with a main range of five bays. The doorway has pilasters, fluted below and panelled above, an entablature with an ornamental frieze, a modillion cornice, and a fanlight in a panelled reveal. The windows are sashes, most with segmental stretcher arches. On the returns are horizontally sliding sashes.	II
Urn west of The Old Rectory; 53.69764°N 0.03432°W	—	1794	The urn is in Coade stone on a limestone pedestal, and is about 2 metres (6 ft 7 in) in height. The pedestal is square with a moulded plinth and cornice, a raised panel and a festoon on the east side, and a stepped cap. The urn has an inscribed and dated base, a frieze of roundels with bears' heads biting swags, a fluted neck and a domed lid.	II
Manor Farmhouse; 53.70296°N 0.03348°W		c. 1800	The house is in grey brick on a plinth, with a hipped Welsh slate roof. There are two storeys and an L-shaped plan, with a front range of three bays, a rear wing on the left with three bays, and a rear outshut on the right. The central doorway has Doric pilasters, a plain entablature, a round-arched entrance with an archivolt and moulded impost bands, and a fanlight in a panelled reveal. The windows are sashes in reveals with channelled wedge lintels and keystones.	II
Patrington Mill; 53.68017°N 0.00239°W		Late 18th to early 19th century	The former tower windmill is in tarred red brick, and consists of a tapering round tower with five storeys. It contains two doorways, a blocked door on the first floor, and windows, some blocked, all with segmental heads. On the first floor is an inscribed plaque.	II
The White Hall; 53.69490°N 0.04311°W	—	c. 1814–15	A small country house in yellow-grey brick, with dressings in sandstone and yellow brick, hipped Westmorland slate roofs, and two storeys. The west front has three bays, and a recessed centre with a projecting Greek Doric sandstone portico with paired fluted columns, a plain entablature, and a moulded cornice and blocking course. The doorway has an architrave, a panelled surround, and an entablature, with a plain frieze, and a moulded cornice on consoles with shell ornament. The east front has six bays, the middle two bays projecting under pediments. The south front has a central full-height bow window. The windows on all fronts are sashes. To the north are two service wings forming a rear courtyard.	II*
Stable and coach-house range, The White Hall; 53.69541°N 0.04310°W	—	c. 1814–15	The range is in yellow-brown brick, with a slate roof, and it has a U-shaped plan, with a central coach house flanked by stable wings. The coach house has two storeys and three bays, and contains three double doors under a panelled timber lintel, over which are three recessed panels, and a hipped roof with a weathervane. This is flanked by single-story bays with further projecting bays at the ends. The openings have rubbed brick flat arches and hipped roofs.	II
Ruston House; 53.68183°N 0.00746°W	—	c. 1815	The front of the house is in grey brick, with red brick and yellow brick dressings elsewhere, on a stuccoed plinth, with a sill band, a wooden gutter on brackets with roundels, and a hipped roof in Welsh slate and pantile. There are two storeys, and L-shaped, double depth plan, with a front range of three bays. In the centre is a projecting Doric porch with tapering octagonal columns and moulded capitals, an entablature with triglyphs and guttae, and a modillion cornice. The doorway has pilasters, a reeded architrave with roundels, a fanlight and side windows. This is flanked by full-height bow windows with sashes and channelled stucco flat arches. At the rear of the right return are two segmental-arched carriage entrances.	II
Milestone; 53.69666°N 0.04897°W		Early 19th century	The milestone on the north side of Patrington Road (A1033 road) is in limestone. It consists of a round-headed stone about 30 centimetres (12 in) square and 70 centimetres (28 in) in height. Attached to it is a cast iron plate with the distances to Patrington and to Hull. Under this is an Ordnance Survey datum mark.	II
Pair of urns north of The Old Rectory; 53.69822°N 0.03362°W	—	Early to mid-19th century	The urns are in stone, and about 1 metre (3 ft 3 in) in height. Each has a square pedestal with a stepped cap, and an urn with waisted base, a ribbed body and an everted rim with leaf and dart moulding.	II
Urn north of The Old Rectory; 53.69823°N 0.03325°W	—	Early to mid-19th century	The urn is in stone, and about 1.6 metres (5 ft 3 in) in height. It consists of a base and a moulded pedestal, on which is an urn with a narrow waisted base, a ribbed body and an everted rim with leaf and dart moulding.	II
Linsdall's Hospital and walls 53.68251°N 0.00628°W		1843	A row of four almshouses in red and yellow brick, with a moulded wooden eaves cornice, deep eaves, and a hipped Welsh slate roof. There is a single storey and four bays. The doors have plain fanlights, and the windows are sashes in architraves under flat rubbed brick arches. On the front is an inscribed and dated plaque. The almshouses are flanked by screen walls, the inner part of each has a recessed round-arched panel, outside which is a pair of square piers with stone coping, a curved section, a pier, a straight section, and another pier.	II
Enholmes Brick and Tile Works; 53.69050°N 0.03312°W	—	Late 1840s	The works, later used for other purposes, are in red brick, with projecting eaves on shaped brackets, plain bargeboards, and a pantile roof. The south front has two storeys, five bays, and twin gables. On the east side are four recessed bays. The west front has 22 bays, six with sliding doors, and on the east front are 15 bays.	II
Cart shed and granary range, Enholmes Farm; 53.67797°N 0.03099°W	—	1849	The farm buildings are in orange-brown brick, with dressings in orange rubbed brick and a hipped pantile roof. There are two storeys and a rectangular plan. In the centre is a cart shed, to the left is a blacksmith's shop, to the right are stables, and above are a granary and lodgings. On the west front are cart openings, a stable door, windows and other openings, all under segmental arches. On the east side is a single-storey lean-to cart shed with a roof on square brick piers.	II
Cattle house range, Enholmes Farm; 53.67793°N 0.03227°W	—	1849	The farm buildings are in orange-brown brick on a largely rendered plinth, with dressings in orange rubbed brick, overhanging eaves, and hipped pantile roofs. There is a rectangular plan, consisting of a series of five parallel ranges divided by passages and linked by a range along the north side to provide covered accommodation for cattle.	II
Engine house and granary range and barn, Enholmes Farm; 53.67823°N 0.03222°W	—	1849	The farm buildings are in orange-brown brick, with dressings in orange rubbed brick, and hipped asbestos roofs. They consist of two parallel ranges, the engine house and granary with 13 bays, and the barn to the north, wider and longer, with eleven bays. The central bay of the southern range has three storeys and forms a tower to the engine house, and the outer bays have two streys. The tower has a band, a panel containing a hole for a former clock, and a cast iron water tank around a truncated octagonal chimney.	II
Implement shed, Enholmes Farm; 53.67831°N 0.03290°W	—	1849	The shed has cylindrical brick piers, later infilled with breeze block and casement windows, and a hipped pantile roof. There is a single storey, a rectangular plan, and six bays.	II
Laundry, Enholmes Farm; 53.67766°N 0.03144°W	—	1849	The laundry is in brick with a hipped pantile roof. There are two storeys and two bays. On the front are two doorways, the windows are horizontally sliding sashes, and the ground floor openings have segmental arches.	II
Main implement shed, Enholmes Farm; 53.67802°N 0.03305°W	—	1849	The shed is in orange-brown brick, with dressings in orange rubbed brick, and a hipped pantile roof. There is a single storey, a rectangular plan, and a range of 16 bays, flanked by single-bay storerooms. On the central section of the east side, the roof is carried on alternate cast iron columns and square brick piers with rounded corners. On the storerooms are segmental-headed doors.	II
Manure shed, Enholmes Farm; 53.67764°N 0.03232°W	—	1849	The manure shed is in brick with a hipped pantile roof. There is a single storey, a rectangular plan, and twelve bays. On the south front is an arcade of recessed round arches between square [piers. On the north side are square piers and later infilling with breeze blocks.	II
Stable range, Enholmes Farm; 53.67785°N 0.03133°W	—	1849	The stable range is in orange-brown brick, with dressings in orange rubbed brick, and hipped pantile roofs. There is a single storey and a U-shaped plan, with a higher single-storey butcher's shop in the northeast corner. Most of the openings have segmental-arched heads.	II
Patrington War Memorial; 53.68389°N 0.01352°W		1917	The war memorial stands in a closed triangular area by a road junction. It consists of a square monolith with a marble tablet on each face, and granite columns at the corners, each with a moulded cap and foot. On the top is a square stone entablature with a granite ball finial on each corner. The memorial stands on a square plinth, chamfered on the corners and the top, on a base of two steps. On the tablets are inscriptions, and the names of those who served and returned, and those who were lost in the First World War. The area is enclosed by fence posts and pairs of chains.	II
Patrington Haven War Memorial; 53.67169°N 0.02456°W	—	1919	The war memorial is in stone, and consists of a small wheel cross on a cylindrical column, on a square plinth, on a square stepped base. On the plinth are four corner columns, between which are recessed panels in darker stone, with inscriptions and the names of those lost in the First World War.	II
