= Listed buildings in Welwick =

Welwick is a civil parish in the county of the East Riding of Yorkshire, England. It contains two listed buildings that are recorded in the National Heritage List for England. Of these, one is listed at Grade I, the highest of the three grades, and the other is at Grade II, the lowest grade. The parish contains the village of Welwick and the surrounding countryside, and the listed buildings consist of a church and a farmhouse.

== Key ==
Grade	Criteria
I	Buildings of exceptional interest, sometimes considered to be internationally important
II	Buildings of national importance and special interest

== Buildings ==
Name and location	Photograph	Date	Notes	Grade
St Mary's Church; 53.66933°N 0.02905°E		Late 13th century	The church has been altered and extended through the centuries. It is built in cobble and limestone, with some brick, the main roof is in lead, and the porch has a pantile roof. The church consists of a nave with a clerestory, north and south aisles, a south porch, a chancel, and a west tower. The tower has two stages, a moulded plinth, diagonal buttresses, quoins, and a square-headed west window with a hood mould under a pointed relieving arch. The pointed bell openings have Y-tracery, and above is a moulded string course and a coped parapet.	I
Haverfield House; 53.66982°N 0.01216°E	—	1779	The farmhouse is in colourwashed red brick, on a plinth, with a floor band, a moulded bracketed wooden eaves cornice and gutter, and a slate roof with stone coped gables. There are two storeys, a double depth plan and five bays. Steps lead to a Doric doorcase with fluted pilasters, an entablature with triglyphs, and a broken pediment, and the doorway has a Gothic fanlight and a moulded cornice. The windows are sashes, those on the ground floor are full-length, and all are under rubbed brick cambered arches.	II
