= Patrington Haven =

Hamlet in the East Riding of Yorkshire, England

Coordinates: 53.671386°N 0.025629°W

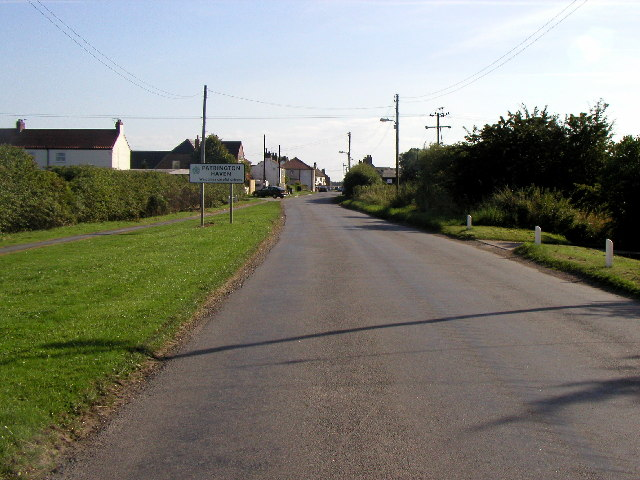

- Location within the East Riding of Yorkshire
- OS grid reference: TA305212
- Civil parish: Patrington
- Unitary authority: East Riding of Yorkshire
- Ceremonial county: East Riding of Yorkshire
- Region: Yorkshire and the Humber
- Country: England
- Sovereign state: United Kingdom
- Post town: HULL
- Postcode district: HU12
- Dialling code: 01964
- Police: Humberside
- Fire: Humberside
- Ambulance: Yorkshire
- UK Parliament: Beverley and Holderness

Patrington Haven is a hamlet in the East Riding of Yorkshire, England, in an area known as Holderness. It is situated approximately 8 miles (13 km) south-east of the town of Hedon and 1 mile (1.6 km) south-west of the village of Patrington.

It forms part of the civil parish of Patrington and was historically called Havenside and had a port on the haven, an arm of water that stretched south towards the North Channel of the Humber estuary (now known as Winestead Drain). The port was closed in 1869 due to siltation of the channels which made the watercourses not able to be navigated by boats. The hamlet has a pub called the Burns Head that is directly opposite the village green with the pond stocked with fish.

The village of Patrington, just 1 mile (1.6 km) away, is dominated by its church known locally as "The Queen of Holderness". Surrounding the church are four public houses, and a fifth public house in Patrington Haven itself.

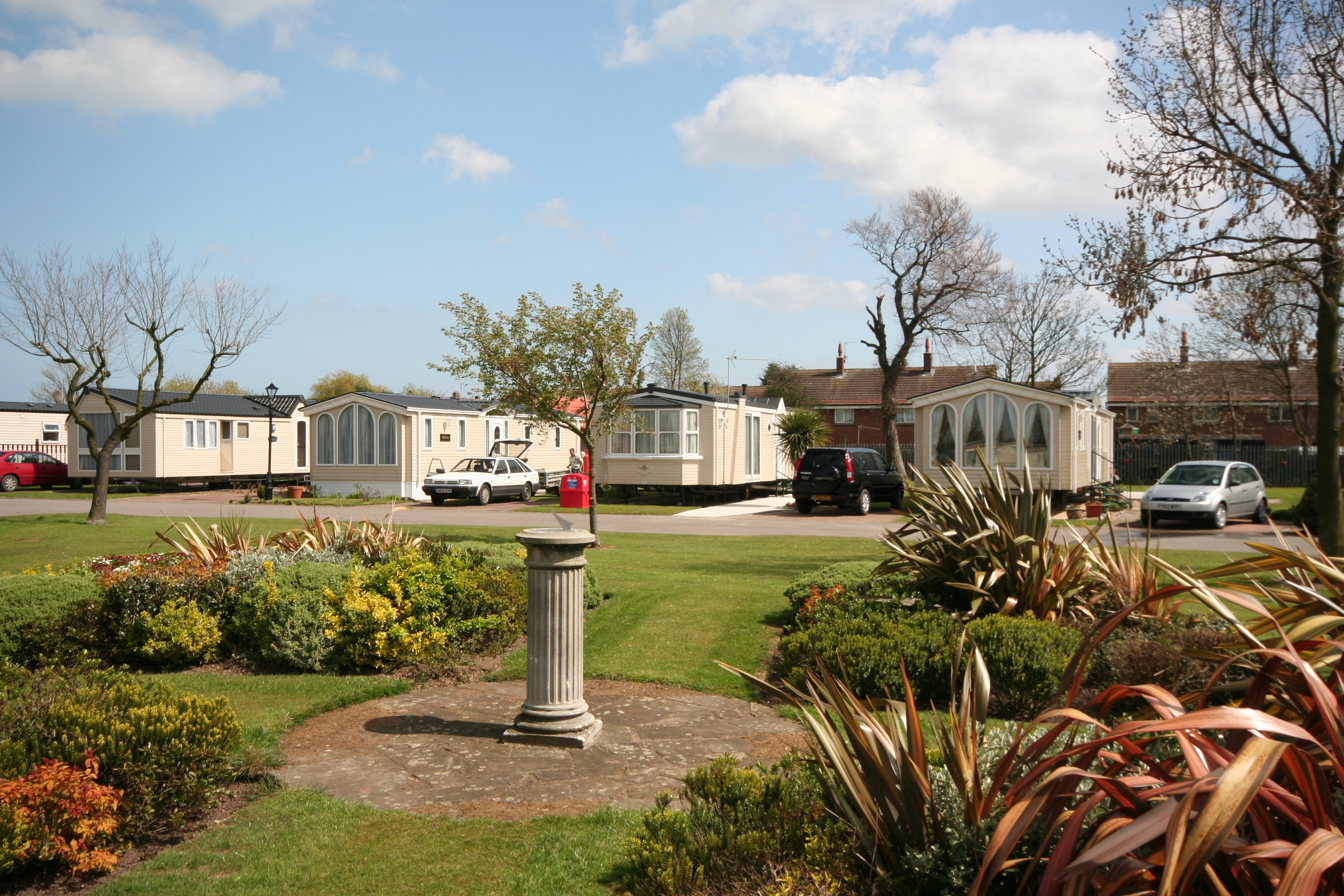
Patrington Haven Leisure Park

In Patrington Haven is an established 5 Star Award Winning Leisure Park called "Patrington Haven Leisure Park". The leisure park was established around 1985 when the RAF Station Patrington closed and the land purchased was by the leisure park. In June 2013 a memorial sculpture to the RAF station was unveiled at the site.

The village was visited by the Beatles in November 1963 before playing a gig in nearby Hull. The fab four enjoyed a pint and sing-song in the Burns Head pub before returning to Hull.

Spurn Point with its bird sanctuary is supported by the RSPB and is a few miles south-east of Patrington Haven village.

== See also ==
- Listed buildings in Patrington
