= Hollym Gate railway station =

Disused railway station in the East Riding of Yorkshire, England

Hollym Gate
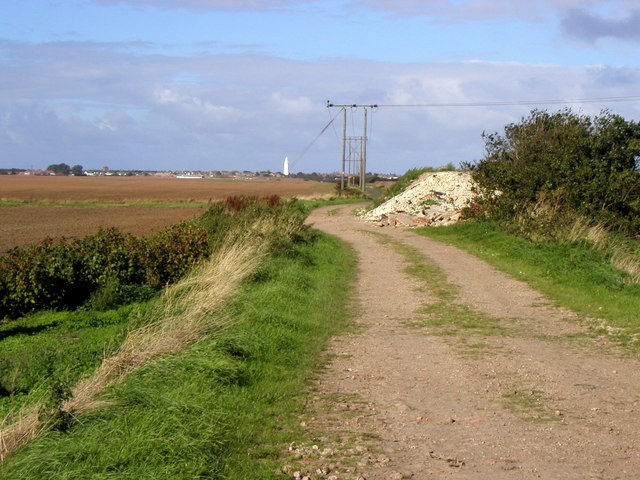
- Former track bed at the site of the former station (2006)

General information
- Location: Hollym, East Riding of Yorkshire; England
- Coordinates: 53.7096°N 0.0170°E
- Grid reference: TA332255
- Platforms: 1

Other information
- Status: Disused

History
- Original company: Hull and Holderness Railway
- Pre-grouping: North Eastern Railway

Key dates
- 1855: Opened
- 1870: Closed
Location

Hollym Gate railway station is a disused railway station on the North Eastern Railway's Hull and Holderness Railway to the west of Hollym, East Riding of Yorkshire, England. It was opened in 1855. The station was closed to passengers on 1 September 1870.

Preceding station	Disused railways	Following station
Patrington	North Eastern Railway; Hull and Holderness Railway	Withernsea
