= St Mary's Church, Welwick =

Coordinates: 53°40′9.58″N 0°01′44.71″E

The Parish Church of St Mary, Welwick
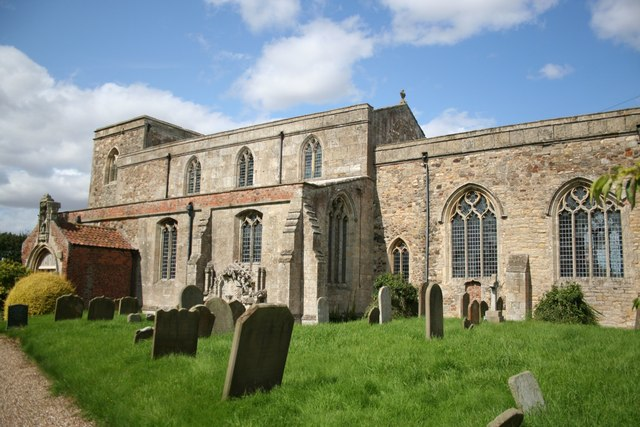
- The Parish Church of St Mary, Welwick
- OS grid reference: TA 34156 21115
- Country: England
- Denomination: Church of England

History
- Dedication: St Mary

Architecture
- Heritage designation: Grade I listed building
- Style: Gothic (Early English, Decorated, and Perpendicular)
- Years built: 13th-15th centuries and 18th century

Administration
- Province: Province of York
- Diocese: Diocese of York

St Mary's Church is an Anglican parish church in the English village of Welwick in the East Riding of Yorkshire. It is a Grade I listed building.

== History ==
The church consists of a west tower of two stages, a four-bay aisled nave (with clerestory) entered through a south porch, and a three-bay chancel. The building material used throughout (except for the later south porch and aisle parapet, built of brick) is limestone in the form of cobble and ashlar. The earliest remains of previous churches on the site date to the 13th century, and are incorporated into the present structure. These include the arch between tower and nave, the eastern corners of the nave, and the western portion of the chancel. Above the tower arch is an asymmetrically set blocked doorway. But the majority of the work is from a rebuilding which occurred during the first half of the 14th century, i.e. entirely during the Decorated period, when aisles and a clerestory were added to the nave and the chancel was extended eastward. The tower was rebuilt during the 15th century, and the south porch during the 18th making use of the original south door.

== Architecture ==
=== Exterior ===
The windows of the nave all feature typical early- to mid-14th century tracery. The forms of these windows are varied, some pointed, some segment-headed, several (three of the four aisle end windows) square-headed: the masons of the East Riding during this time commonly employed square-headed windows, adapting Decorated tracery motifs for use in them (see St Helen's Church, Skipwith, the foremost example). Buttresses are used between bays and at the angles. There is an elaborate projection below a window on the south aisle wall; this is only explained when one goes inside the building (see below). The nave clerestory has three windows on each side, of two lights with cusped Y-tracery. The original nave gable can be traced below the 14th-century gable, which carries a cross, as does the chancel gable. The western portions of the chancel walls are of the 13th century, with an original lancet window on the north side, and on the south side a window of two trefoiled lights with an unencircled quatrefoil above. The rest of the chancel is of the 14th-century extension. This part has two large pointed three-light windows on each side, all with graceful flowing tracery of the same pattern. The southeast window was later altered very lopsidedly to include a fourth light. Below the southwest window is a blocked doorway. The fine east window of five lights with subdivided reticulations can be dated to 1358 by a will bequeathing money for its construction. Short buttresses reaching only to mid-window level are employed at the eastern corners of the chancel and between the windows. The tower, rebuilt in the Perpendicular style of the 15th century, is of two stages with angle buttresses. It has a square-headed lower west window of two lights with three-centred heads, and pointed belfry openings with uncusped Y-tracery. The south porch has a beautiful 14th-century doorway with continuous mouldings under an ornate niche with a figure of the Virgin and Child, all left over from the original two-story porch and all reset within 18th-century brick. Simple coped parapets occur on all the walls of the building.

=== Interior ===
Inside are four-bay Decorated arcades with octagonal piers and double-chamfered arches. The five-bay oak screen is Perpendicular, restored by John Bilson in 1906. The font is of the same period, with an 18th-century cover. The pulpit is dated 1618. On the clerestory walls are remains of post-Reformation wall paintings. For stained glass, Pevsner mentions only the east window of 1877, attributed to Clayton & Bell, and calls it ‘good’.

The most outstanding feature of the interior is the tomb in the south aisle, much mutilated by being reset into the wall. Indeed one side is now exposed on the exterior wall of the church. Dating to c. 1340-50, it commemorates a priest, thought to be either William de la Mare, Provost of Beverley or his brother Thomas, vicar of Welwick. It is of the highest quality and enriched with flowing tracery, foliate carving, figures of saints and angels, the symbols of the Evangelists and the Passion, and heraldry. Under an ogee canopy with a ribbed vault lies the effigy of a priest in mass vestments. Pevsner attributes the monument to one of the carvers of the Percy tomb in Beverley Minster, and assigns the south doorway with its sculpture (described above) to the same Beverley workshop which produced these tombs. The Beverley workshop supplied numerous sculptures and monuments to churches throughout the region. As an example, see the statue of the Virgin in St Patrick's Church, Patrington.

== See also ==
- Grade I listed churches in the East Riding of Yorkshire
- Listed buildings in Welwick
