= Weeton, East Riding of Yorkshire =

Hamlet in the East Riding of Yorkshire, England

Coordinates: 53.660868°N 0.049253°E

Weeton
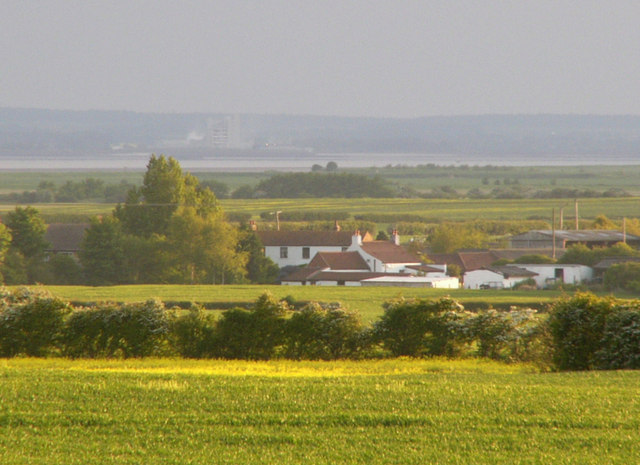
- Weeton village centre

- Location within the East Riding of Yorkshire
- OS grid reference: TA355202
- Civil parish: Welwick
- Unitary authority: East Riding of Yorkshire
- Ceremonial county: East Riding of Yorkshire
- Region: Yorkshire and the Humber
- Country: England
- Sovereign state: United Kingdom
- Post town: HULL
- Postcode district: HU12
- Dialling code: 01964
- Police: Humberside
- Fire: Humberside
- Ambulance: Yorkshire
- UK Parliament: Beverley and Holderness

Weeton is a hamlet in the East Riding of Yorkshire, England, in an area known as Holderness. It is situated approximately 1 mile (1.6 km) south-east of the village of Welwick on the B1445 road from Patrington to Easington.

It forms part of the civil parish of Welwick.
