= Robert Thew =

English engraver

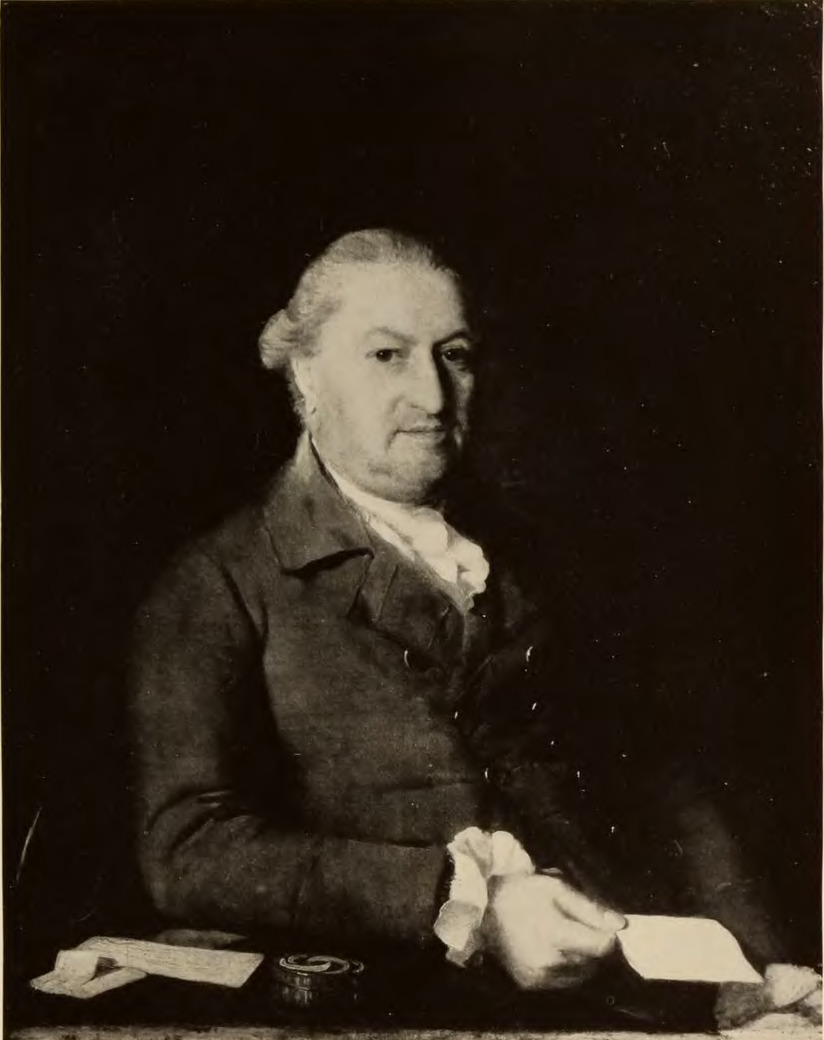
- portrait by Gilbert Stuart
- Born: 1758
- Died: 1802 (aged 43–44)
- Occupation: Engraver

Robert Thew (1758–1802) was an English engraver.

He was born in 1758 at Patrington, Holderness, Yorkshire, where his father kept an inn. He received but little education, and for a time followed the trade of a cooper; but, possessing great natural abilities, he invented an ingenious camera obscura, and later took up engraving, in which art, although entirely self-taught, he attained to a high degree of excellence. In 1783 he went to Hull, where he resided for a few years, engraving at first shop-bills and tradesmen's cards. His earliest work of a higher class was a portrait of Harry Rowe, the famous puppet-show man, and in 1786 he etched and published a pair of views of the new dock at Hull, which were overlooked by Francis Jukes. Having executed a good plate of a woman's head after Gerard Dou, he obtained from the Marquis of Carmarthen an introduction to John Boydell, for whose large edition of Shakespeare he engraved in the dot manner twenty-two plates after Northcote, Westall, Opie, Peters, and others. Of these the finest is the entry of Cardinal Wolsey into Leicester Abbey, after Westall. Thew also engraved a few excellent portraits, including Master Hare, after Reynolds, 1790; Sir Thomas Gresham, after Sir Anthony More, 1792; and Miss Turner, with the title ‘Reflections on Werter,’ after Richard Crosse. He held the appointment of historical engraver to the Prince of Wales, and died at or near Stevenage, Hertfordshire, and was buried at All Saints church, Willian, Hertfordshire on 10 July 1802.
