= Welwick =

Village and civil parish in the East Riding of Yorkshire, England

Coordinates: 53.668584°N 0.031689°E

- Location within the East Riding of Yorkshire
- Population: 297 (2011 census)
- OS grid reference: TA343210
  - London: 150 mi (240 km) S
- Civil parish: Welwick
- Unitary authority: East Riding of Yorkshire
- Ceremonial county: East Riding of Yorkshire
- Region: Yorkshire and the Humber
- Country: England
- Sovereign state: United Kingdom
- Post town: HULL
- Postcode district: HU12
- Dialling code: 01964
- Police: Humberside
- Fire: Humberside
- Ambulance: Yorkshire
- UK Parliament: Beverley and Holderness

Welwick is a village and civil parish in the East Riding of Yorkshire, England, in an area known as Holderness. It is situated approximately 4 miles (6.4 km) south of the town of Withernsea and 2 miles (3.2 km) south-east of the village of Patrington on the B1445 road from Patrington to Easington.

The civil parish is formed by the village of Welwick and the hamlet of Weeton. According to the 2011 UK census, Welwick parish had a population of 297, a reduction on the 2001 UK census figure of 307.

The name Welwick derives from the Old English wellawīc meaning 'trading settlement by a spring'.

In 1823 Welwick inhabitants numbered 410, including the settlements of Thorpe Plewland and Weeton. Occupations included eleven farmers, three shoemakers, two blacksmiths, two wheelwrights, a corn miller, a butcher, a tailor, a grocer who was also a draper, and the landlady of the Wheat Sheaf public house. There existed a Quaker Meeting House and a Methodist chapel. Baines' History, Directory & Gazetteer of the County of York mentions an ancient and "grand" monument within St Mary's Church supposedly removed from Burstall Abbey, and perhaps a memorial to either John de Fortibus or William le Gros, Earl of Albemarle. Welwickthorpe, in the parish of Welwick lay between the village and Patrington.

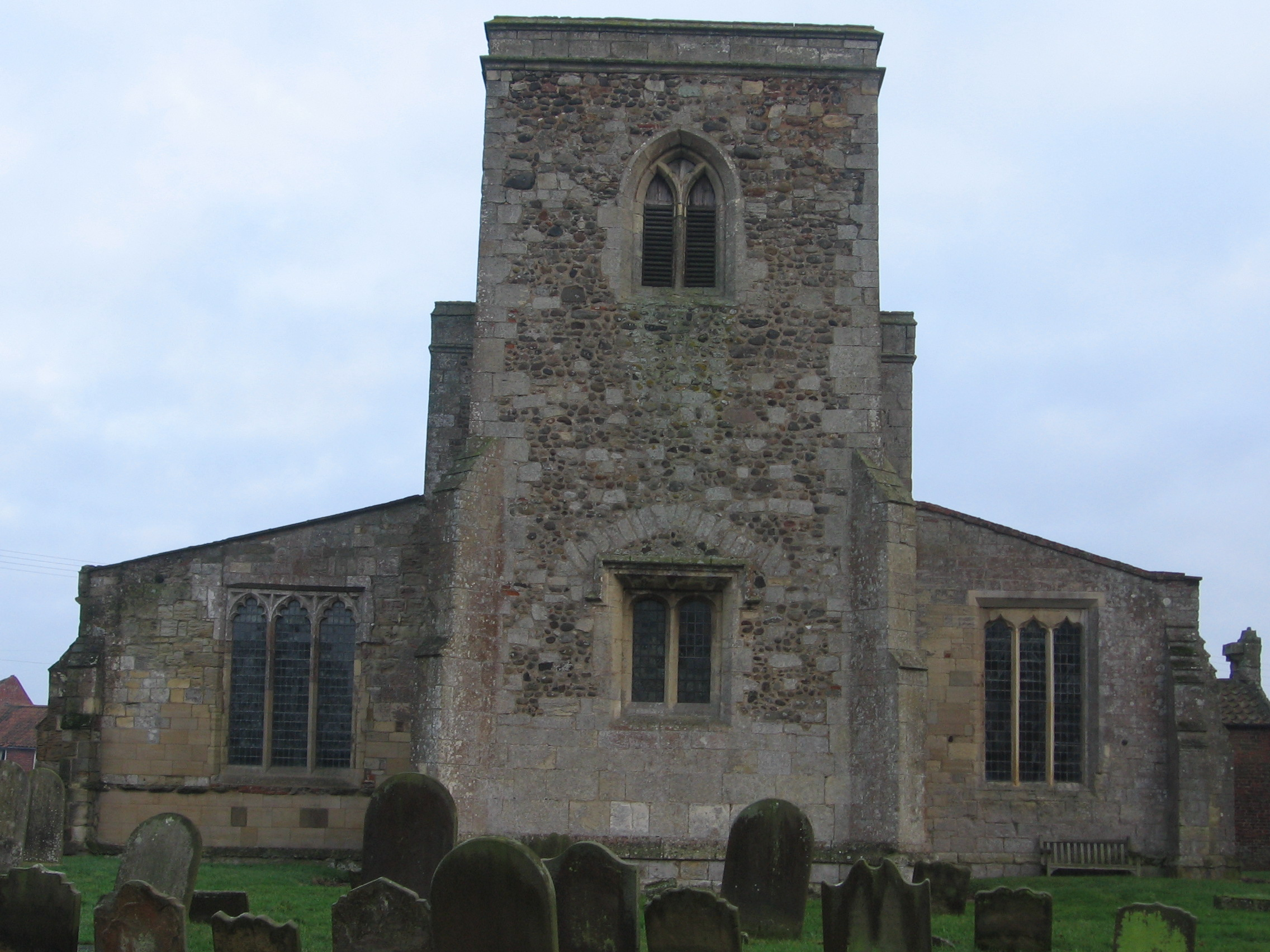
St Mary's Church, Welwick

The parish church of St Mary is a Grade I listed building.

A sand and gravel pit was established in the south-west of the parish in the 1930s, located parallel and south of Pant Drain, the site's development was driven by the 1930s building boom. The extracted material, which lay less than 1 foot below the ground, was washed and grade separated on site by a rotary screen. By 1938 a rail tramway had been built to transport the excavated material to the main road – the line ran southwards from the midpoint of the B1445 between Welwick and Patrington, passing west of Haverfield House, to Oxlands Hill, and used a diesel shunting locomotive capable of hauling 120 tons; the material was transported in short wheelbase side tipping wagons.

== Notable residents ==
- Christopher Wright and John Wright⁣ – both involved in the Gunpowder Plot.
- Mary Ward, an English Roman Catholic nun and founder of the Sisters of Loreto (also known as the Institute of the Blessed Virgin) lived in the village from 1590 to 1594 under the care of her grandmother Ursula Wright. Ursula had been imprisoned fourteen years for the "exhalation of the Catholic religion" and was mother to John and Christopher Wright, who were involved in the Gunpowder Plot. Here Ward's grandmother would teach her Latin and become an example of integrity.

== See also ==
- Listed buildings in Welwick
