= Winestead railway station =

Disused railway station in the East Riding of Yorkshire, England

Winestead
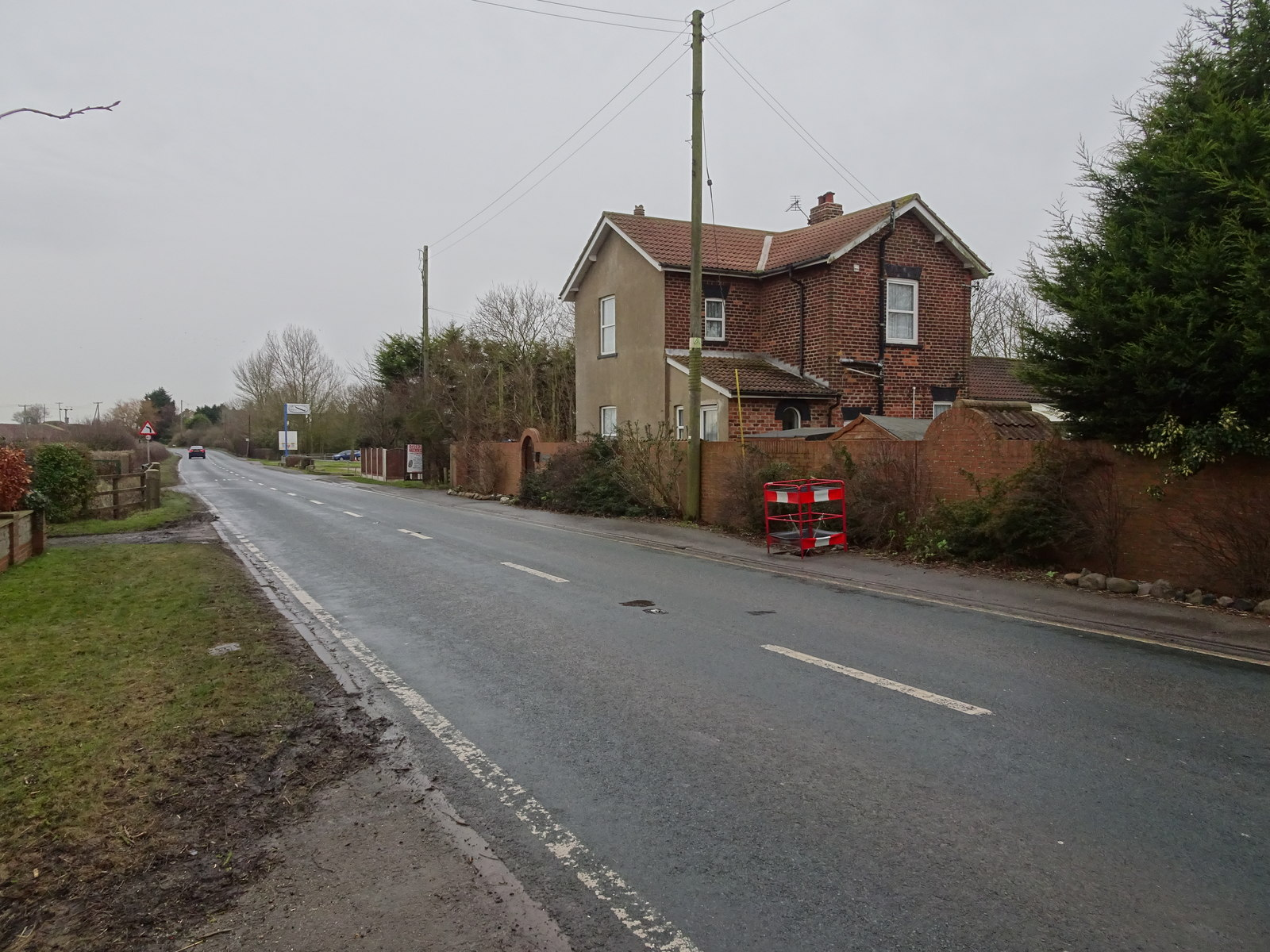
- Site of the former station (2018)

General information
- Location: Winestead, East Riding of Yorkshire; England
- Coordinates: 53.6904°N 0.0310°W
- Grid reference: TA300233
- Platforms: 1

Other information
- Status: Disused

History
- Original company: Hull and Holderness Railway
- Pre-grouping: North Eastern Railway
- Post-grouping: London and North Eastern Railway

Key dates
- 1854: Opened
- 1 July 1904: Closed to passengers
- 1 May 1956: closed for freight
Location

Winestead railway station is a disused railway station on the North Eastern Railway's Hull and Holderness Railway to the south of Winestead, East Riding of Yorkshire, England. It was opened by the Hull and Holderness Railway on 27 June 1854 The station was closed to passengers on 1 July 1904 and freight in 1956.

Preceding station	Disused railways	Following station
Ottringham	North Eastern Railway; Hull and Holderness Railway	Patrington
