= St Helen's Church, Skeffling =

Church of St Helen, Skeffling
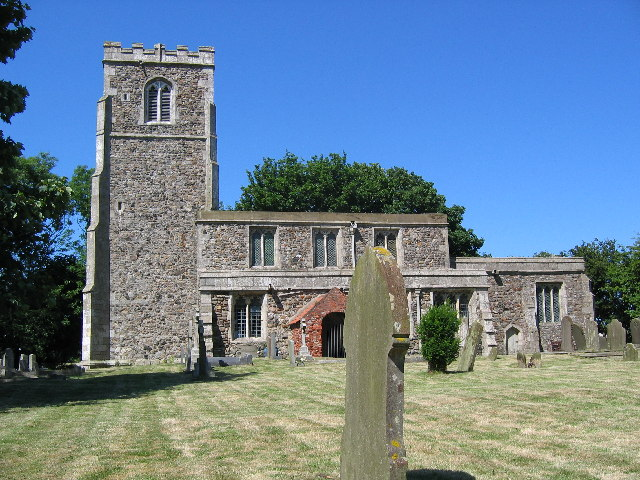

- Location in the East Riding of Yorkshire
- 53.65°N 0.0725°E
- Location: Skeffling, Holderness, East Riding of Yorkshire, England

History
- Built: 15th century

Site notes
- Restored: 19th/20th centuries
- Governing body: Friends of Friendless Churches

Listed Building – Grade I
- Official name: Church of St Helen, Skeffling
- Designated: 16 December 1966
- Reference no.: 1161165

Listed Building – Grade II
- Official name: Cross 6m south of Church of St Helen
- Designated: 27 February 1987
- Reference no.: 1083463

St Helen's is a redundant church in the village of Skeffling, Holderness, in the East Riding of Yorkshire, England (grid reference TA370190). Dating from the mid-15th century, the church was dedicated to St Helena. It is recorded in the National Heritage List for England as a designated Grade I listed building and is under the care of the Friends of Friendless Churches.

== History ==
The Church of St Helen dates from around 1460. It stands in an isolated setting in the village of Skeffling on the edge of the North Sea. (Note: The Holderness peninsula was described by Philip Larkin, a frequent visitor from his home in Kingston upon Hull; "Fast-shadowed wheat-fields, running high as hedges, Isolate villages where removed lives Loneliness clarifies. Here silence stands Like heat".) It was restored in the very early 20th century, and again in 1984–85. When active, the church was within the Deanery of South Holderness within the Diocese of York. Faced with steeply declining congregations, (Note: According to the 2011 UK census, Skeffling parish had a population of 149.) the church was declared redundant in 2018. In 2021 it was taken into the care of the Friends of Friendless Churches.

== Architecture and description ==
St Helen's consists of a nave with porch, a chancel and a western tower. David Neave, writing in his Yorkshire: York and the East Riding volume in the Buildings of England series, revised and re-issued in 2005, notes the tower's "fine Perpendicular Gothic" design. The building material is local cobblestone. The interior contains a collection of 18th-century funerary monuments, many commemorating members of the Holme and the Bee families, who were major local landowners. The church is a Grade I listed building. A cross in the churchyard contemporaneous with the church has its own Grade II listing. It is topped by a sundial dating from the late 18th century.

== See also ==
- Grade I listed churches in the East Riding of Yorkshire
- Listed buildings in Skeffling

== Gallery ==
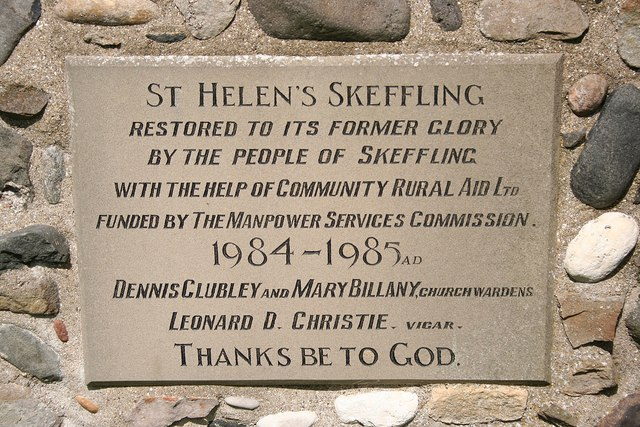
Plaque commemorating the 1980s restoration

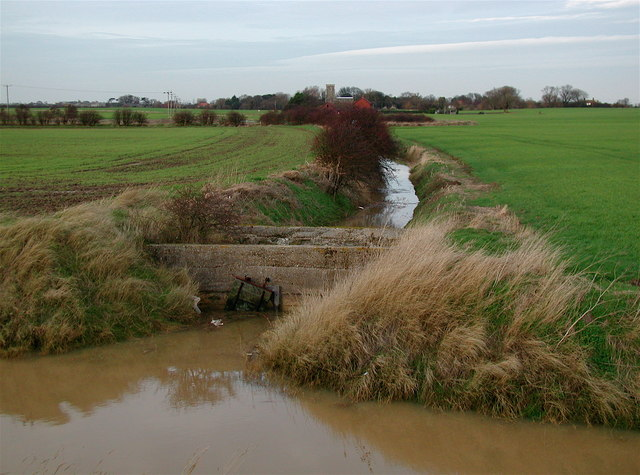
The church in its isolated, rural, setting

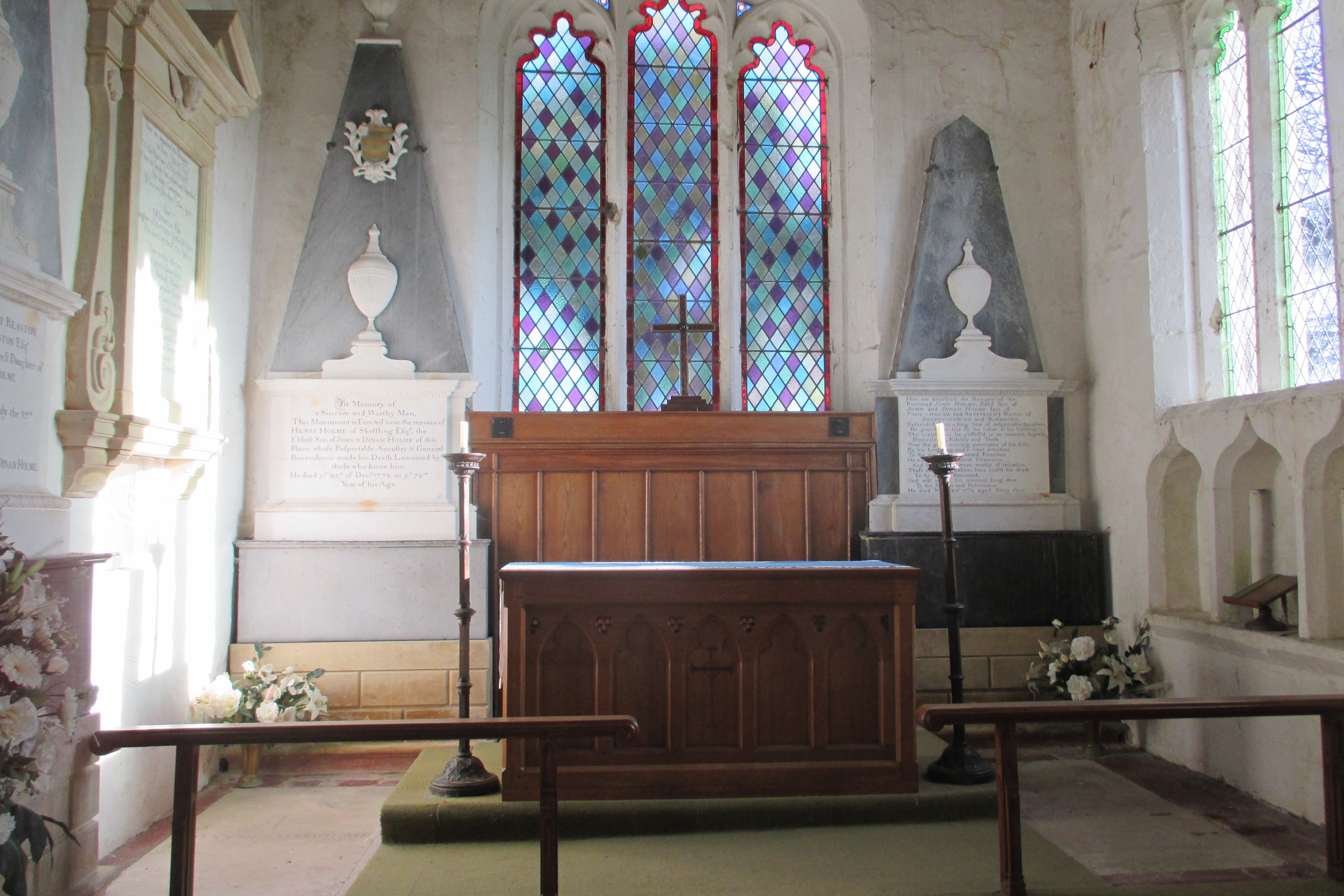
Interior

== Sources ==
- Pevsner, Nikolaus; Neave, David (2005). Yorkshire: York and the East Riding. The Buildings of England. New Haven and London: Yale University Press. ISBN 0-300-09593-7.
