= Skeffling =

Village and civil parish in the East Riding of Yorkshire, England

Coordinates: 53.653476°N 0.073939°E

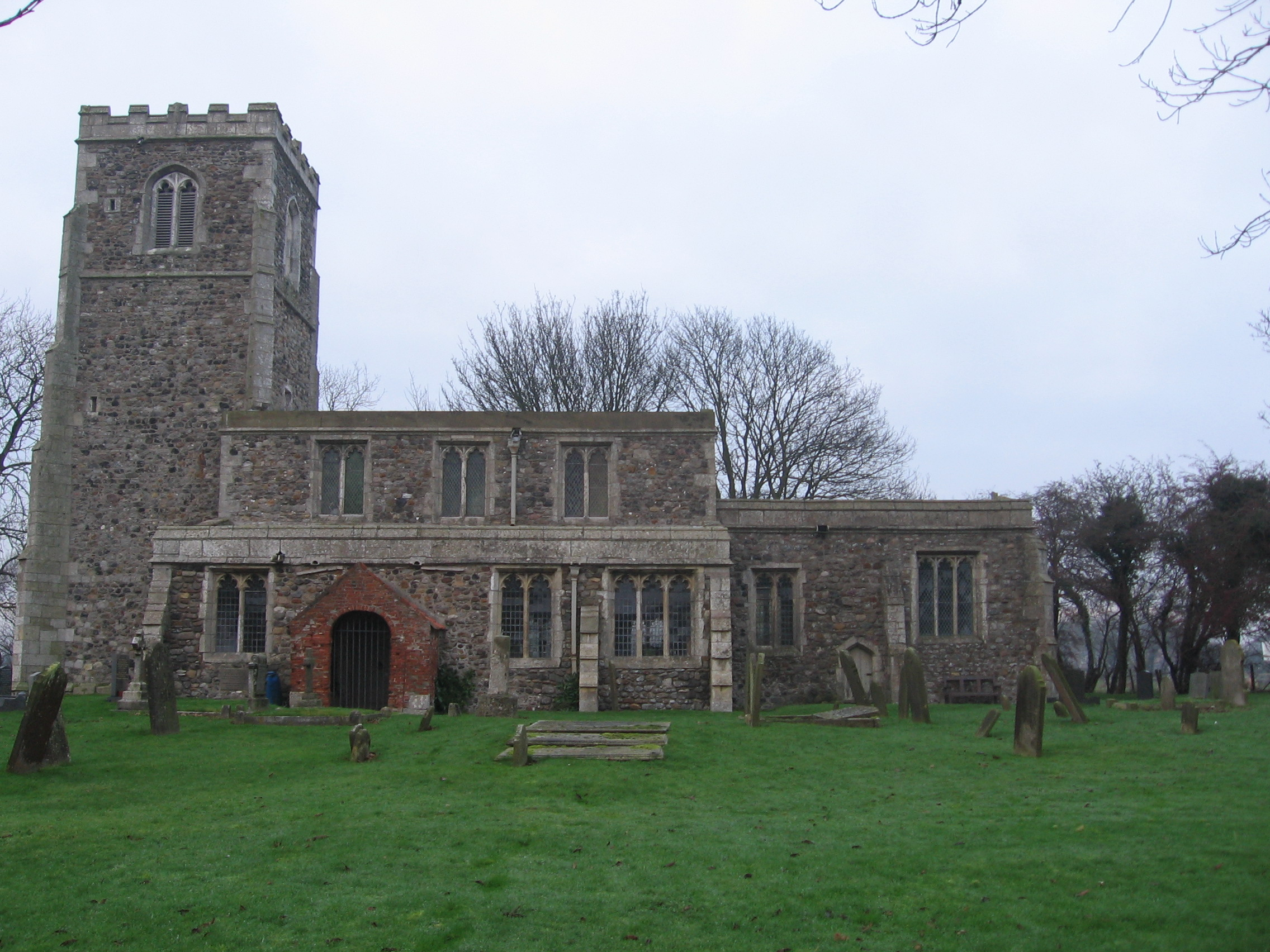
- St Helen's Church

- Location within the East Riding of Yorkshire
- Population: 149 (2011 census)
- OS grid reference: TA371194
- Civil parish: Skeffling
- Unitary authority: East Riding of Yorkshire
- Ceremonial county: East Riding of Yorkshire
- Region: Yorkshire and the Humber
- Country: England
- Sovereign state: United Kingdom
- Post town: HULL
- Postcode district: HU12
- Dialling code: 01964
- Police: Humberside
- Fire: Humberside
- Ambulance: Yorkshire
- UK Parliament: Beverley and Holderness

Skeffling is a village and civil parish in the East Riding of Yorkshire, England, in an area known as Holderness. It is situated approximately 5 miles (8 km) south of the town of Withernsea and 4 miles (6.4 km) south-east of the village of Patrington on the B1445 road from Patrington to Easington.

According to the 2011 UK census, Skeffling parish had a population of 149, a decrease on the 2001 UK census figure of 153.

The Church of St Helen is a Grade I listed building that is situated to the south of the village. It is constructed of cobble with stone dressings and was built in the 1460s.

== History ==
The origin of the name Skeffling is unknown but possibly derives from the Old Norse personal name Sceftela or Skapti, and either the Old English ing meaning 'the place of', or ingas meaning 'the people of'. Another theory suggests its origin to be a Scandinavianised form of the Old English sceafting, meaning 'place of shafts', or sceaftlēahing, meaning 'the place of the shaft wood'.

Skeffling is recorded in the Domesday Book (1086) as Skeflingun.

== Skeffling projects ==
Among developments in Skeffling has been the installation, by Eagle Power, of a 6 kW wind turbine on a free standing 15-metre (49 ft) mast. This was made possible with help from the BERR's Low Carbon Buildings Program, Langeled's Rural Communities Development Fund, DEFRA, Yorkshire Forward, Humber & Wolds Rural Community Council and with vital help and guidance from Karen Wood, the rural communities' officer from East Riding of Yorkshire Council.

The turbine was installed on 20 February 2007 and powers Skeffling Village Hall, with any excess is sold to the National Grid; the proceeds are used to help maintain and eventually replace the turbine. The decision to use renewable energy was made with long term sustainability in mind.

== See also ==
- Listed buildings in Skeffling
