= St Germain's Church, Winestead =

Church in Winestead, East Riding of Yorkshire, England, UK

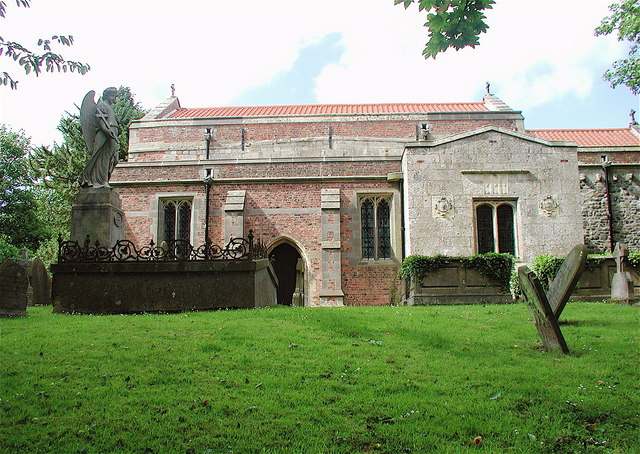
The church, in 2010

St Germain's Church is an Anglican church in Winestead, a village in the East Riding of Yorkshire, in England.

The church was built in the 12th century, from which period survive the walls of the chancel and the north wall of the nave. The north door dates from the late 13th century, and the south arcade from the 14th century. The chancel arch was built around 1400. Early in the 17th century, the south aisle was demolished and replaced by a chapel. In 1694, the north door was replaced and, perhaps at the same time, the chancel was repaired. Between 1888 and 1889, the church was restored by Temple Moore, who added a new south aisle, rebuilt the south chapel and part of the north wall, and replaced the roof and the seating. A north porch was added in 1901, and around 1985 the church was re-roofed. The building has been grade I listed since 1966.

The church is built of a variety of materials, including cobbles, limestone and red brick, with stone dressings, and has roofs of pantile and lead. The church consists of a two-bay nave, a south aisle, a north porch, and a single-bay chancel with a single-bay south chapel. A length of Norman corbel table is built into the south chancel wall. Inside, there are numerous monuments including an effigy of a priest, dating from around 1400; and a chest tomb with an effigy of Christopher Hildyard, who died in 1602. The chancel has a double sedilia, a piscina, and a reredos which dates from 1889. There is a 17th-century octagonal pulpit, a 14th-century octagonal font, 18th-century chandeliers, and a brass lectern designed by George Gilbert Scott Jr. There are some fragments of mediaeval stained glass in the south window of the chancel, and various items of woodwork made from pieces of 17th-century pews.

== See also ==
- Grade I listed buildings in the East Riding of Yorkshire
- Listed buildings in Patrington
