= Winestead =

Village in the East Riding of Yorkshire, England

Coordinates: 53.701628°N 0.033303°W

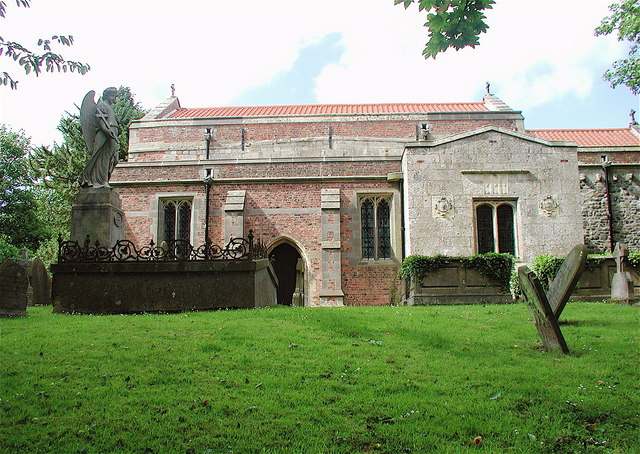
- St Germain's Church, Winestead

- Location within the East Riding of Yorkshire
- OS grid reference: TA299245
  - London: 155 mi (249 km) S
- Civil parish: Patrington
- Unitary authority: East Riding of Yorkshire
- Ceremonial county: East Riding of Yorkshire
- Region: Yorkshire and the Humber
- Country: England
- Sovereign state: United Kingdom
- Post town: HULL
- Postcode district: HU12
- Dialling code: 01964
- Police: Humberside
- Fire: Humberside
- Ambulance: Yorkshire
- UK Parliament: Beverley and Holderness

Winestead is a village in the civil parish of Patrington, in the East Riding of Yorkshire, England, in an area known as Holderness. It is situated approximately seven miles (eleven kilometres) south-east of Hedon and 1 1/2 miles (2.5 kilometres) north-west of Patrington. It is situated to the north of the A1033 road. In 1931 the parish had a population of 153. On 1 April 1935 the parish was abolished and merged with Patrington.

The name Winestead possibly derives from the Old English wīfstede meaning 'women's place'. Another theory derives it from Wifastede or Wifestede, meaning 'Wifa/Wife's place'.

It is also the ancient seat of the Hildyard/Hilliard/Hildegardis family, whose ancestry is believed to be of Saxon origin. The Hildyard family of Winestead became extinct on the death of Sir Robert D'Arcy Hildyard, Bart., who died without heirs in 1814. Hildyard bequeathed his estates to his niece, Ann Catherine Whyte, who married in the following year Thomas Blackborne Thoroton, Esq., of Flintham Hall, Flintham, Nottingham. Col. Thoroton of the Coldstream Guards subsequently assumed the name and coat-of-arms of Hildyard. His heirs, who still have the surname Hildyard, reside at Flintham Hall today. The Hildyard family lived at Winestead for 10 generations, and even after the death of the last Baronet, the heirs continued to own Winestead Hall.

In 1823 inhabitants in the village numbered 129. Occupations included six farmers.

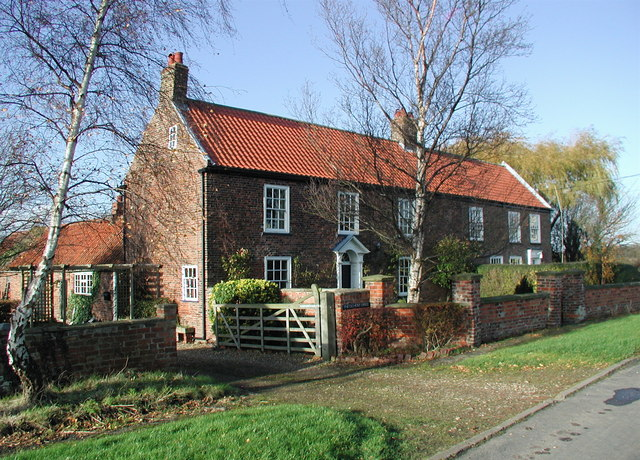
The old Post Office in Winestead

The Anglican St Germain's Church, Winestead was designated a Grade I listed building in 1966 and is now recorded in the National Heritage List for England, maintained by Historic England.

The White Hall was designated a Grade II* listed building in 1966 and is now recorded in the National Heritage List for England, maintained by Historic England.

Winestead was served from 1854 to 1964 by Winestead railway station on the Hull and Holderness Railway.

== Notable people ==
- Andrew Marvell (1621–1678), metaphysical poet, MP and diplomat, was born in the village.
- Henry Maister (1813–1898), cricketer

== See also ==
- Listed buildings in Patrington
