= Patrington =

Village and civil parish in the East Riding of Yorkshire, England

Coordinates: 53.683563°N 0.011264°W

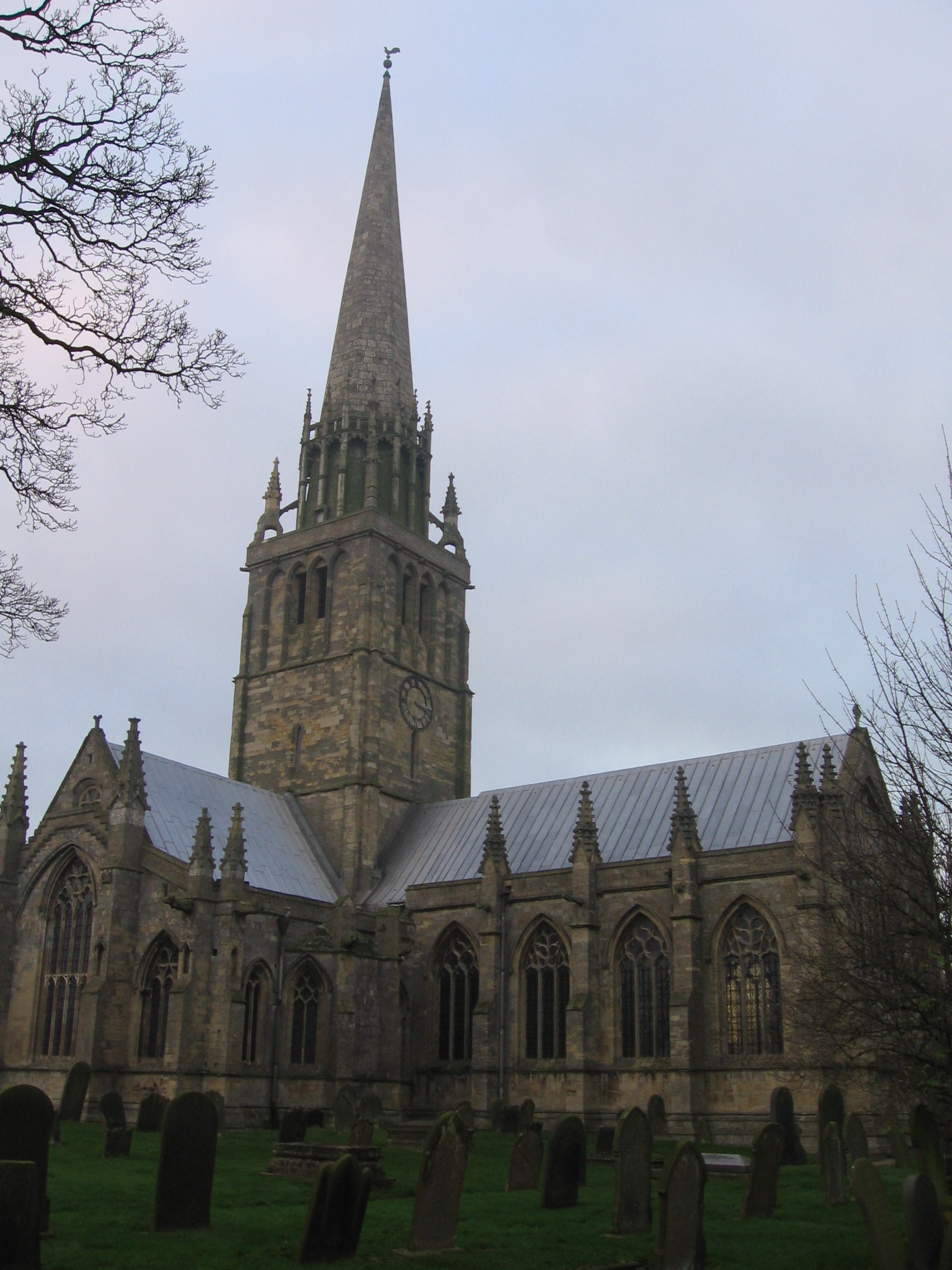
- St Patrick's Church, Patrington

- Location within the East Riding of Yorkshire
- Population: 2,059 (2011 census)
- OS grid reference: TA314226
  - London: 150 mi (240 km) S
- Civil parish: Patrington
- Unitary authority: East Riding of Yorkshire
- Ceremonial county: East Riding of Yorkshire
- Region: Yorkshire and the Humber
- Country: England
- Sovereign state: United Kingdom
- Post town: HULL
- Postcode district: HU12
- Dialling code: 01964
- Police: Humberside
- Fire: Humberside
- Ambulance: Yorkshire
- UK Parliament: Beverley and Holderness

Patrington is a village and civil parish in the East Riding of Yorkshire, England, in an area known as Holderness, 9 miles (14 km) south-east of Hedon, 16 miles (26 km) south-east of Kingston upon Hull and 4 miles (6.4 km) south-west of Withernsea on the A1033. Along with Winestead, it was a seat of the ancient Hildyard/Hilliard/Hildegardis family.

The Prime Meridian passes just to the east of Patrington.

The civil parish is formed by the villages of Patrington and Winestead and the hamlet of Patrington Haven and at the 2011 census, had a population of 2,059, an increase on the 2001 UK census figure of 1,949.

RAF Patrington, built during the Second World War, was a radar station and used for ground-controlled interception. In 1955, following the building of a new RAF station at nearby Holmpton, the radar site closed, being surplus to requirements. The new radar site at Holmpton was later renamed RAF Patrington.

Patrington was served from 1854 to 1964 by Patrington railway station on the Hull and Holderness Railway.

St Patrick's Church is an example of the decorated period of Gothic architecture. Known as the "Queen of Holderness", it is a Grade I listed building. It contains an Easter Sepulchre.

== Village amenities ==
The village has a central square of shops, known as the market place, which offer a wide range of services for residents and are often used as a "stop-off" for drivers passing through the village going towards Withernsea or Easington. Shops and services include a general store, petrol station, hardware store, four bakeries and cafes, four public houses, a country house bed and breakfast, a fish and chip shop, pharmacy, three hair/beauty salons (with a fourth to be opened soon to replace the Barclays Bank branch), a country wear store, two florists/homemade gift stores. The doctors' surgery forms part of the South Holderness Medical Practice. Alongside businesses, there is a football pitch adjacent to the playing fields and a cricket pitch opposite the primary school, which holds regular tournaments with teams all over the country.

== Notable people ==
- Robert Thew (1758–1802), engraver
- John Hawley (b.1954), footballer

== See also ==
- Listed buildings in Patrington
