= Raywell =

Hamlet in the East Riding of Yorkshire, England

Coordinates: 53.764247°N 0.499941°W

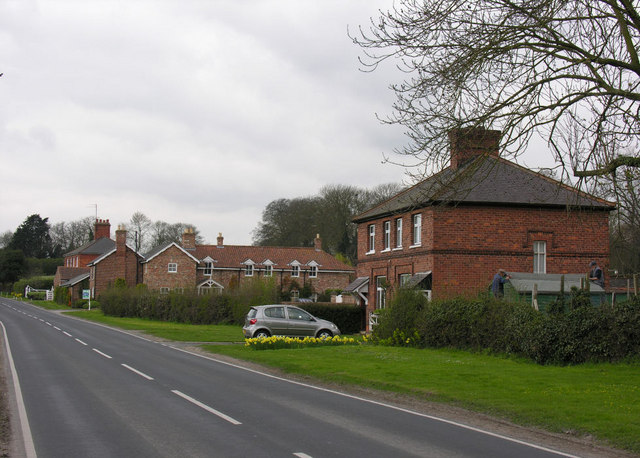
- Raywell from the east

- Location within the East Riding of Yorkshire
- OS grid reference: SE989308
- Civil parish: Skidby
- Unitary authority: East Riding of Yorkshire
- Ceremonial county: East Riding of Yorkshire
- Region: Yorkshire and the Humber
- Country: England
- Sovereign state: United Kingdom
- Post town: COTTINGHAM
- Postcode district: HU16
- Dialling code: 01482
- Police: Humberside
- Fire: Humberside
- Ambulance: Yorkshire
- UK Parliament: Goole and Pocklington

Raywell is a hamlet in the East Riding of Yorkshire, England located in the civil parish of Skidby and situated approximately 7 miles (11 km) north-west of Hull city centre and 2 miles (3.2 km) north of Swanland.

It is located on the crossroads of Westfields Road and Riplingham Road. These roads link Riplingham (South Cave), Eppleworth (Cottingham) and Kirk Ella.

Raywell consists of a farm and an old manor house. Raywell Park is a local Scout/Girl guides residential and camping site, where the Humberside Scout County offices are located. Locally it is also noted because of a number of walks that start there.

== See also ==
- Listed buildings in Skidby
