= Newbald =

Civil parish in the East Riding of Yorkshire, England

Coordinates: 53°49′N 0°37′W

- Civil parish
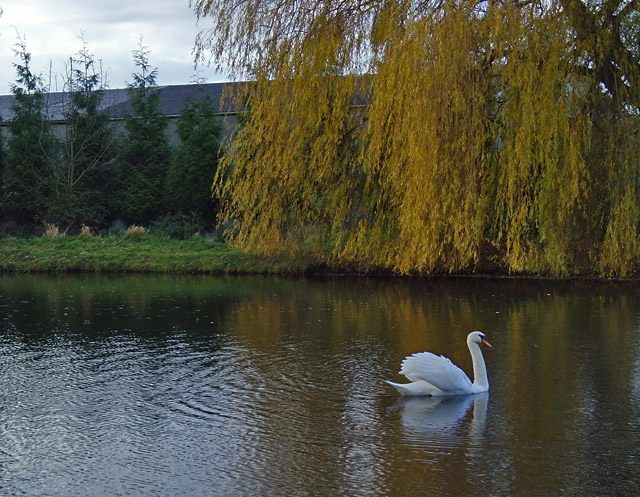
- Mill pond at Lower Mill Farm, next to the A1034

- Population: 1,115 (2011 census)
- OS grid reference: SE911365
- Civil parish: Newbald
- Unitary authority: East Riding of Yorkshire
- Ceremonial county: East Riding of Yorkshire
- Region: Yorkshire and the Humber
- Country: England
- Sovereign state: United Kingdom
- Post town: YORK
- Postcode district: YO43
- Police: Humberside
- Fire: Humberside
- Ambulance: Yorkshire
- UK Parliament: Beverley and Holderness
- Website: Newbald Parish Council

Newbald is a civil parish in the East Riding of Yorkshire, England. It is situated approximately 8 miles (13 km) west of the market town of Beverley and covering an area of 2,429.702 hectares (6,003.92 acres).

The civil parish is formed by the village of North Newbald and the hamlet of South Newbald. It is drained by Ings Beck which ultimately feeds into the Humber at Brough, East Riding of Yorkshire. The beck powered a watermill to the south of the village. East of the village, the South Cave to Market Weighton or Goodmanham section of the Yorkshire Wolds Way passes through Swin Dale.

According to the 2011 UK census, Newbald parish had a population of 1,115, an increase on the 2001 UK census figure of 989.

== Governance ==
Newbald was in the Haltemprice and Howden parliamentary constituency until the 2010 general election when it was transferred to the constituency of Beverley and Holderness.

== See also ==
- Listed buildings in Newbald
