= High Hunsley =

Hamlet in the East Riding of Yorkshire, England

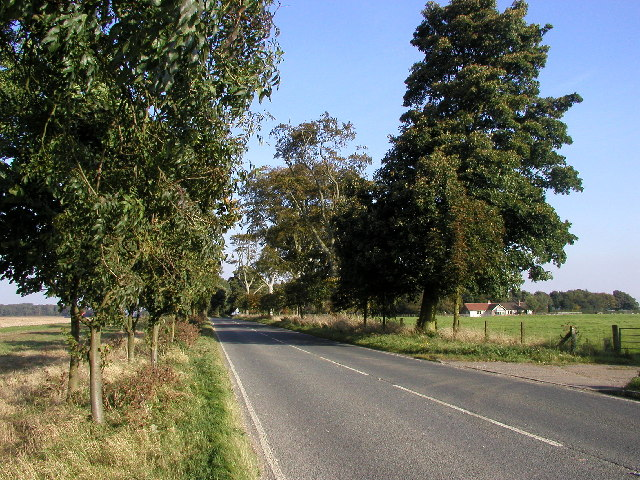
- The B1230 east of High Hunsley

- Location within the East Riding of Yorkshire
- OS grid reference: SE950351
  - London: 160 mi (260 km) S
- Civil parish: Rowley
- Unitary authority: East Riding of Yorkshire
- Ceremonial county: East Riding of Yorkshire
- Region: Yorkshire and the Humber
- Country: England
- Sovereign state: United Kingdom
- Post town: COTTINGHAM
- Postcode district: HU20
- Dialling code: 01430
- Police: Humberside
- Fire: Humberside
- Ambulance: Yorkshire
- UK Parliament: Goole and Pocklington

High Hunsley is a small hamlet in the East Riding of Yorkshire, England. It is situated in the Yorkshire Wolds approximately 6 miles (10 km) south-west of Beverley town centre and 2 miles (3 km) north-west of the village of Little Weighton.

High Hunsley forms part of the civil parish of Rowley. It is situated on the B1230 road and the Yorkshire Wolds Way passes close to the west.

In 1823 Hunsley (then both High and Low), was in the civil parish of Rowley and the Wapentake of Harthill. Occupations at the time included two farmers, a corn factor (trader), a yeoman, and a gentlewoman.

== Deserted medieval village ==
In 1823 Baines' History, Directory and Gazetteer of the County of York stated that Hunsley was formerly "a place of some consequence," where "the foundations of ancient buildings are sometimes dug up".

In 2022 one of the house platforms in the deserted medieval village was partially excavated by the local community assisted by archaeologists from Ethos Heritage CIC. The excavations were attended by over 150 local participants including local special needs schools, the Girl Guides, Brownies, Children in Care and Special Needs Schools.

They found some well preserved remains, including a suspected alehouse or inn. In addition a large amount of Medivial Pottery and Metal Artefacts were uncovered including air pins, coins and dress fastenings.

== Transmitter site ==
To the west of the settlement is the 61-metre (200 ft) High Hunsley transmitter (53.8031°N 0.5653°W), which is used by local radio stations BBC Radio Humberside, Hits Radio East Yorkshire & North Lincolnshire and Capital Yorkshire. The ground around the transmitter is at a height of around 160 metres (525 ft) above sea level.

=== Analogue radio ===
Frequency	kW	Service
95.9 MHz	9.6	BBC Radio Humberside
96.9 MHz	9.4	Hits Radio East Yorkshire & North Lincolnshire
105.8 MHz	9.6	Capital Yorkshire

=== Digital radio ===
Frequency	Block	kW	Service
215.072 MHz	10D	5	Bauer Humberside
223.936 MHz	12A	5	MuxCo Lincolnshire
225.648 MHz	12B	2	BBC National DAB
