= South Newbald =

Hamlet in the East Riding of Yorkshire, England

Coordinates: 53.810557°N 0.617360°W

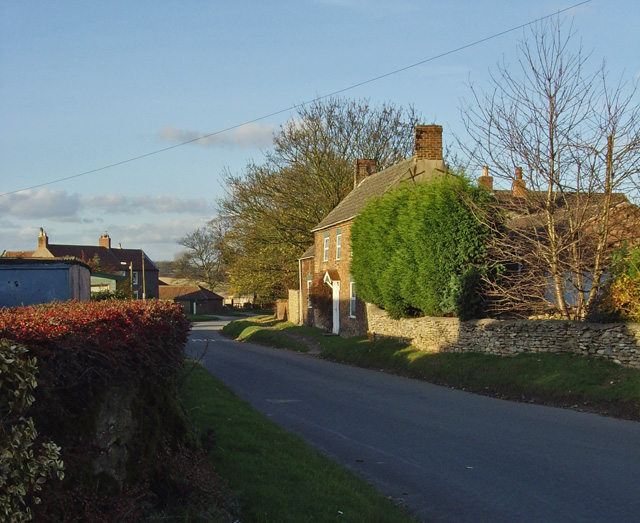
- South Newbald hamlet

- Location within the East Riding of Yorkshire
- OS grid reference: SE911358
  - London: 160 mi (260 km) S
- Civil parish: Newbald
- Unitary authority: East Riding of Yorkshire
- Ceremonial county: East Riding of Yorkshire
- Region: Yorkshire and the Humber
- Country: England
- Sovereign state: United Kingdom
- Post town: YORK
- Postcode district: YO43
- Dialling code: 01430
- Police: Humberside
- Fire: Humberside
- Ambulance: Yorkshire
- UK Parliament: Beverley and Holderness

South Newbald is a hamlet and former civil parish, now in the parish of Newbald, in the East Riding of Yorkshire, England. It is situated approximately 12 miles (19 km) north-west of Hull city centre, 2.5 miles (4 km) north of South Cave and 4 miles (6.4 km) south of Market Weighton. It lies to the east of the A1034 road. The larger village of North Newbald is just to the north. In 1931 the parish had a population of 173.

In 1823 South Newbald was in the civil parish of North Newbald, the Wapentake of Harthill and the Liberty of St Peter's. Population at the time was 179, with occupations including seven farmers & yeomen and three corn millers. Resident was a banker, an overseer, and the vicar of North Newbald.

The name Newbald derives from the Old English nīwebōðl meaning 'new dwelling'.

== Governance ==
The hamlet was in the Haltemprice and Howden parliamentary constituency until the 2010 general election when it was transferred to the constituency of Beverley and Holderness.

In 1866 South Newbald became a civil parish, on 1 April 1935 the parish was abolished to form "Newbald".

== See also ==
- Listed buildings in Newbald
