= Riplingham =

Hamlet in the East Riding of Yorkshire, England

Coordinates: 53.774846°N 0.540080°W

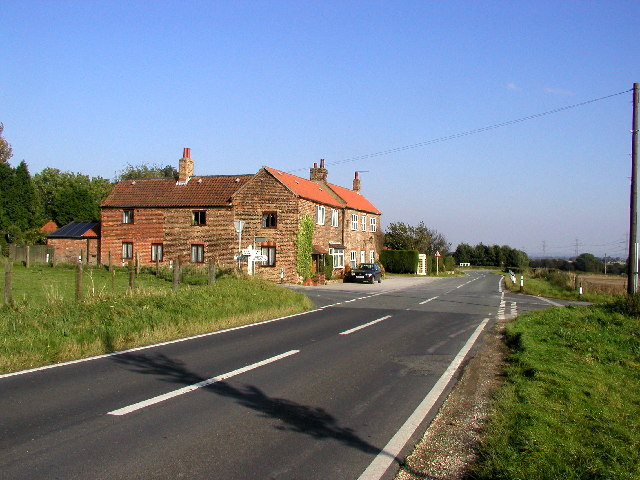
- Riplingham Crossroads

- Location within the East Riding of Yorkshire
- OS grid reference: SE963319
- Civil parish: Rowley South Cave
- Unitary authority: East Riding of Yorkshire
- Ceremonial county: East Riding of Yorkshire
- Region: Yorkshire and the Humber
- Country: England
- Sovereign state: United Kingdom
- Post town: COTTINGHAM
- Postcode district: HU20
- Post town: BROUGH
- Postcode district: HU15
- Dialling code: 01482; 01430
- Police: Humberside
- Fire: Humberside
- Ambulance: Yorkshire
- UK Parliament: Goole and Pocklington

Riplingham is a hamlet in the East Riding of Yorkshire, England. It is situated approximately 7 miles (11 km) south-west of Beverley and 3 miles (4.8 km) east of South Cave, on the crossroads that link (broadly speaking) South Cave, Welton, North Newbald and Raywell.

Riplingham is part in the civil parish of Rowley and part in the civil parish of South Cave. It is represented at Westminster as part of the Goole and Pocklington Constituency.

It has no shops, but does have a good view of Hull, and the surrounding area, including the Humber estuary and its south bank.

It is also the site of a medieval village.

In 1955 a Ham class minesweeper HMS Riplingham was named after the village.

== See also ==
- Listed buildings in Rowley, East Riding of Yorkshire
- Listed buildings in South Cave
