= Skidby =

Village and civil parish in the East Riding of Yorkshire, England

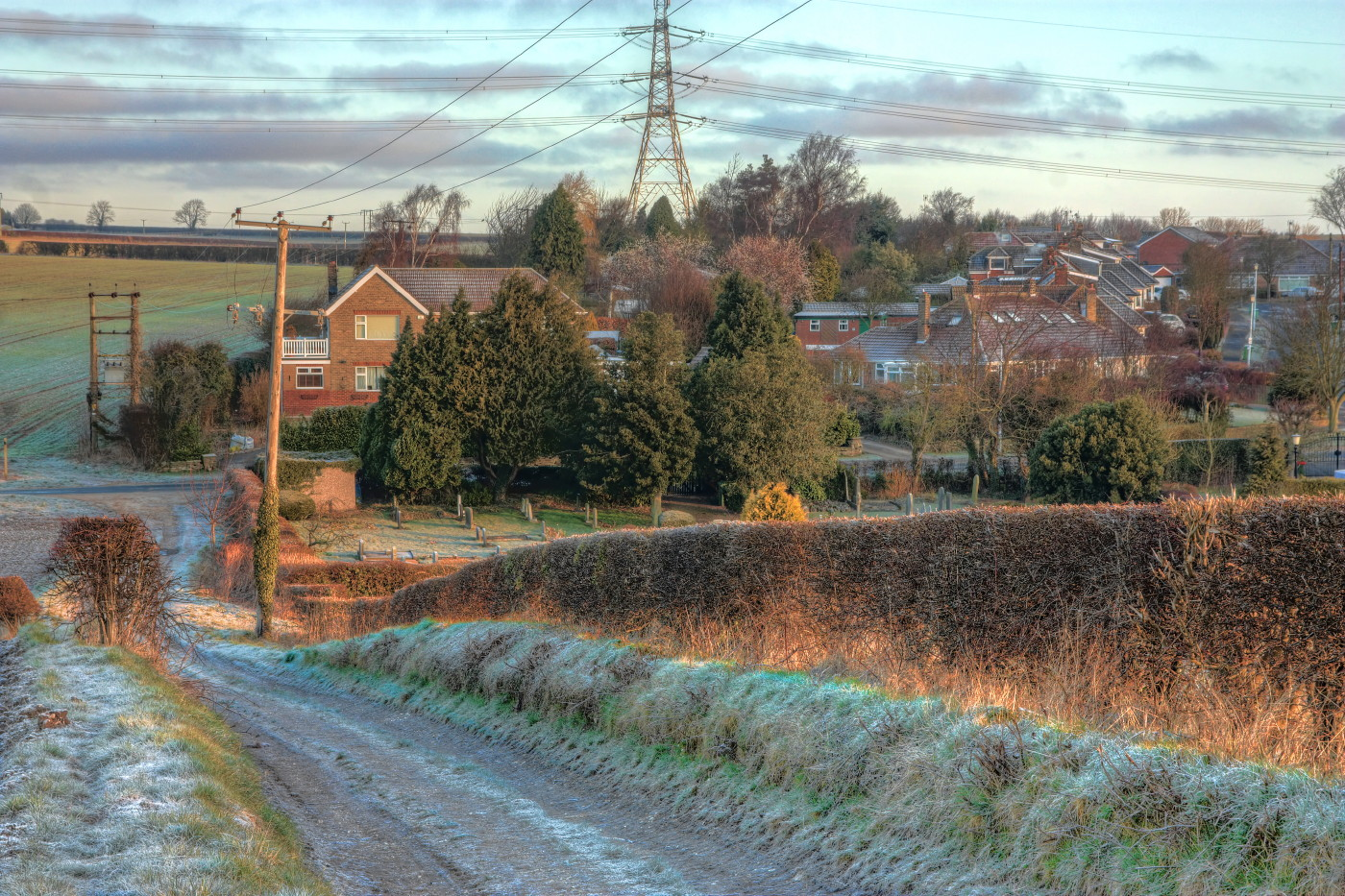

- Location within the East Riding of Yorkshire
- Population: 1,284 (2011 census)
- OS grid reference: TA014336
- Civil parish: Skidby
- Unitary authority: East Riding of Yorkshire
- Ceremonial county: East Riding of Yorkshire
- Region: Yorkshire and the Humber
- Country: England
- Sovereign state: United Kingdom
- Post town: COTTINGHAM
- Postcode district: HU16
- Dialling code: 01482
- Police: Humberside
- Fire: Humberside
- Ambulance: Yorkshire
- UK Parliament: Goole and Pocklington

Skidby is a small village and civil parish in Yorkshire Wolds of the East Riding of Yorkshire, England. It is situated about 6 miles (10 km) north-west of Hull city centre, 2.2 miles (3.5 km) west of Cottingham and 5 miles (8 km) south of Beverley.

The civil parish contains mainly agricultural land, both in the hills of the wolds and the low-lying land. The civil parish also includes the hamlets of Eppleworth and Raywell.

The village is the site of Skidby Windmill, a Grade II* listed building.

== Geography ==
The modern civil parish includes the village of Skidby and the hamlet of Eppleworth, (Note: 53.774335°N 0.463215°W, Eppleworth) and Raywell. (Note: 53.763945°N 0.497373°W, Raywell House) Most of the parish lies west-south-west of the village in the Yorkshire Wolds, rising from about 160 feet (50 m) above sea level at Skidby to about 330 feet (100 m) on the western fringes. The A164 road forms part of the south-eastern boundary of the parish, on the edge of the Wolds.

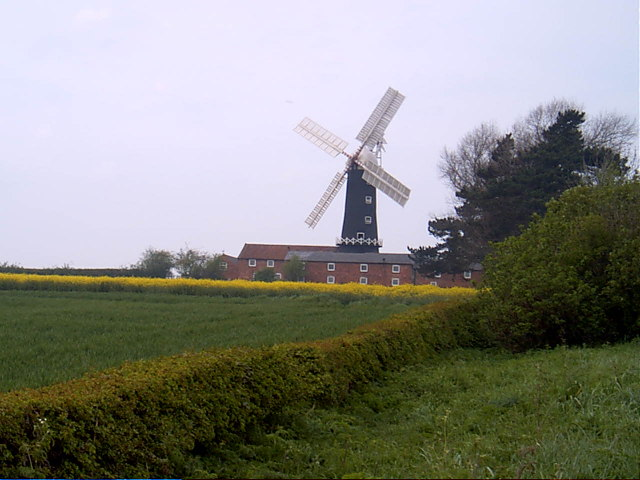
Skidby Windmill is surrounded by fertile agricultural land typical of the East Riding

Part of the parish is to the east of the village and A164 beyond the Wolds, and north of Cottingham, extending as far as the Hull to Bridlington railway line at its easternmost extent, the land height drops to the east reaching a low of less than 33 feet (10 m) near the railway line. The part of the parish east of the A164 includes a golf course 'Skidby Lakes Golf course' and associated leisure club, (Note: 53.79533°N 0.44391°W, Skidby Lakes Golf Club) as well as a major (400/275 kV AC) electricity substation "Creyke Beck", (Note: 53.800828°N 0.415159°W, Creyke Beck electricity substation) (Note: Creyke Beck is usually associated by address with Cottingham, not Skidby, being much closer and being accessible via Cottingham not Skidby) The remainder of the low-lying area is agricultural.

Most of the parish area is west of the A164, within the wolds: Hessle Golf Club is north of the Eppleworth to Raywell road (Westfield Road), (Note: 53.7718°N 0.4863°W, Hessle Golf Club course) There is a traveller's site at a former chalk quarry near Eppleworth; (Note: 53.777866°N 0.452133°W, Traveller site, former Chalk pit, Westfield Road.) and a waste composting facility near the former Albion Mill on the route of the former Hull and Barnsley line, (Note: 53.768277°N 0.466180°W, Waste management site (composting)) expanded to include an in-vessel composting facility in 2015, used to process organic waste from East Riding of Yorkshire Council and Hull City Council. The remainder of the area is in agricultural use.

In the 2011 UK census, Skidby parish had a population of 1,284, a fall from the 2001 UK census figure of 1,369.

=== Skidby village ===
Skidby has a single main street, Main Street, running roughly east–west: the eastern end leads to Cottingham, making a crossroads with the former Hessle to Beverley turnpike before a roundabout junction with the A164 road. At the western end of the village Little Weighton Road leads roughly towards Little Weighton; to the south is Riplingham Road, also leading westward, currently (2006) a farm track and footpath.

== History ==
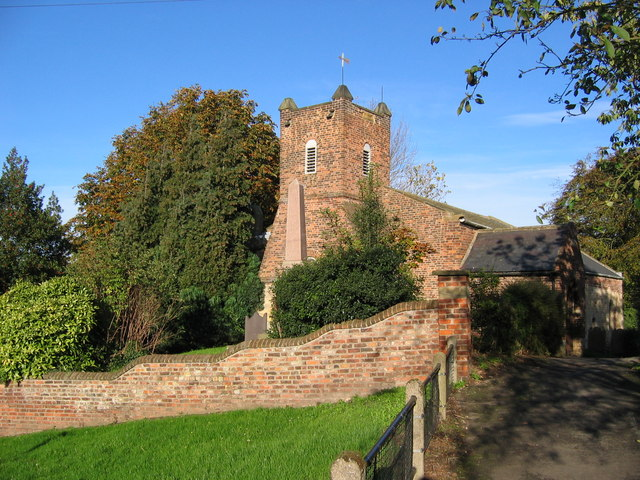
St Michael's Church, Skidby

The village's name is thought mean dwelling (-bý) of a person called Skítr, ("Skyti's farm") the words are of Scandinavian origin. An alternative origin meaning 'firewood place' (from skið and by), an origin from the person's name skiði has also been suggested. Other alternatives are 'dirty place', from the old English scite.

The village name 'Skidby' is first recorded by Oswald, Archbishop of York in the 10th century, as Scyteby: the bishop Oscytel was recorded as having acquired it for £20. In Domesday Book it is referred to as Schitebi – at the time of the survey it was recorded together with 'Burtone' (near Bishop Burton): the land belonged to the manor of Beverley (in the hands of the church), with over 20 villains and 3 knights.

The forms Skipbie, and Skitby were in use in the 16th century, in the 19th century 'Skitby' was a common form, as was the current form Skidby. (Note: The name of the town has also been confused with archaic forms of Skeeby, a place in Richmondshire, North Yorkshire.)

The church of St Michael dates to 1777, with a tower built in 1827. The church was designated a Grade II* listed building in 1968. Wesleyan and Baptist chapels were built in the early 1800s, and a school and teacher's house built in 1849. A cornmill, Skidby Mill was constructed in 1821, raised in the 1870s and listed in 1952.

By the 1850s the village population had reached 306; in 1857 the ecclesiastical parish of Skidby became fully separated from Cottingham and received a resident clergyman.

Around 1885 the Hull and Barnsley Railway was constructed (section closed 1960s), running north-east through the parish: no stations were constructed on the section near Skidby; at the point the railway crossed the Eppleworth valley a five arched brick viaduct was constructed, known locally as 'five arches', or as 'Eppleworth viaduct'. (Note: 53.770926°N 0.471056°W, Eppleworth viaduct (demolished)) (Note: The viaduct was completed in 1881, demolished in the 1970s. The Little Weighton cutting and adjacent quarries were used for landfill between 1970 and 2000s. See main article Hull and Barnsley Railway for details.) North-west of the viaduct the line required an 83 ft (25 m) cutting, known as the Little Weighton Cutting.

In 1972, 120 acres (49 ha) of land north of the Eppleworth to Raywell road was acquired for the Hessle Golf Club, which was relocating due to the construction of the Humber Bridge; the eighteen-hole course was opened in 1975.

A traveller's site was established on Westfield Road in a disused chalk pit in the 1980s. During the COVID pandemic in 2020, volunteers set up a mini-library in a village phone box as a way of boosting interactions between villagers. In 2025, the BBC reported that the book swap was stopped after telecoms company KCOM cited that the telephone was still in use and that shelves of books posed "a serious fire risk."

== See also ==
- Listed buildings in Skidby
