= Risby, East Riding of Yorkshire =

Place in the East Riding of Yorkshire, England

Coordinates: 53.800770°N 0.470167°W

Risby
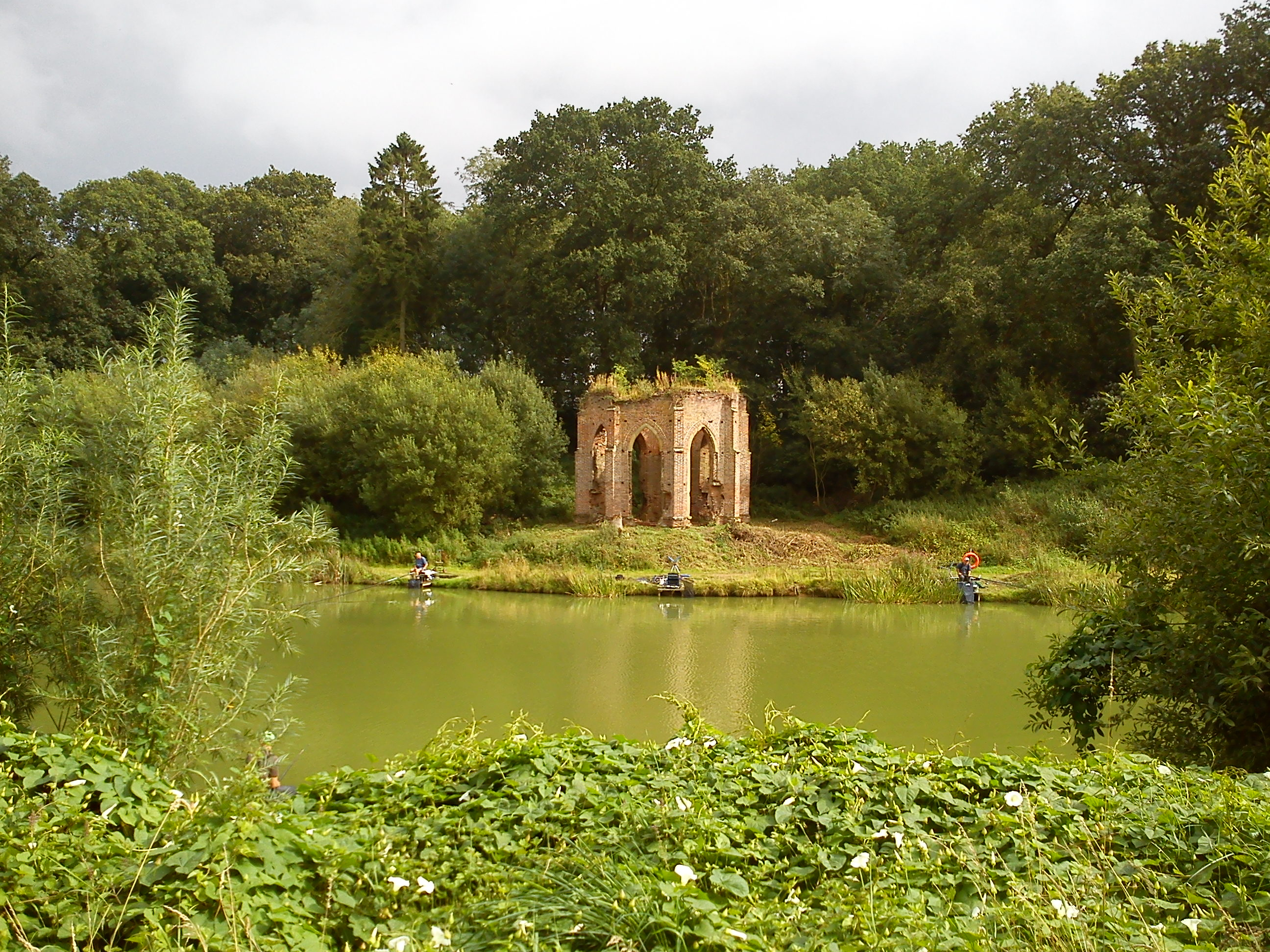
- Risby Folly, in Risby Park

- Location within the East Riding of Yorkshire
- OS grid reference: TA008349
- Civil parish: Rowley
- Unitary authority: East Riding of Yorkshire
- Ceremonial county: East Riding of Yorkshire
- Region: Yorkshire and the Humber
- Country: England
- Sovereign state: United Kingdom
- Post town: BEVERLEY
- Postcode district: HU17
- Dialling code: 01482
- Police: Humberside
- Fire: Humberside
- Ambulance: Yorkshire
- UK Parliament: Goole and Pocklington

Risby is the site of a deserted village and former stately home in the civil parish of Rowley in the East Riding of Yorkshire, England. It is approximately 3.5 miles (5.6 km) south-west of Beverley and 1 mile (1.6 km) west of the A164 road.

The area has an open partially wooded parkland, once one of the largest deer parks in Yorkshire, that is popular with local walkers. It also includes Risby Park, a farm, the Folly Lake Cafe. There are several fishponds in the ornamental lakes of the former hall, which have been operated as coarse fishing locations since 1990. The site also has an octagonal brick folly that is designated Grade II.

== Name ==
Risby was mentioned in the Domesday Book as Risebi. The name is from the Old Norse hrís and bỹ, and means "village or farm in the brushwood, or where brushwood was collected".

== Risby Hall ==
Risby Hall was the home of the Ellerker family between the early 14th and the late 18th centuries. It was built in the 1680s and expanded until it was ravaged by fire in the 1770s. It was repaired but was destroyed by fire again in the 1780s. The hall's foundations are visible in the fields near Risby.

=== Parklands ===
The former Risby Hall had extensive parklands which included ornamental lakes, parkland, woodland, and a brick folly which were extended in the late 18th century shortly before the hall's destruction. The lakes were created by Easton Mainwaring Ellerker between 1769 and his death in 1771. The folly was built in c. 1770 as part of a landscaping improvement by the Elleker Family.

In 1550 a deer park was created through the enclosure of some of the estate, and it was subsequently expanded until the 17th century. Henry VIII and his court were entertained at Risby by Sir Ralph Ellerker at the former Ellerker manor house at nearby Cellar Heads, shortly before the deer park's development in 1540.

== See also ==
- Listed buildings in Rowley, East Riding of Yorkshire
