= Newport, East Riding of Yorkshire =

Village and civil parish in the East Riding of Yorkshire, England

Coordinates: 53°45′47″N 0°42′05″W

Newport
- Location within the East Riding of Yorkshire
- Population: 1,580 (2011 census)
- OS grid reference: SE858304
  - London: 155 mi (249 km) S
- Civil parish: Newport
- Unitary authority: East Riding of Yorkshire
- Ceremonial county: East Riding of Yorkshire
- Region: Yorkshire and the Humber
- Country: England
- Sovereign state: United Kingdom
- Post town: BROUGH
- Postcode district: HU15
- Dialling code: 01430
- Police: Humberside
- Fire: Humberside
- Ambulance: Yorkshire
- UK Parliament: Goole and Pocklington

Newport is a village and civil parish in the East Riding of Yorkshire, England. It is approximately 7 miles (11 km) east of the market town of Howden. It lies on the B1230 road to the south of the M62 motorway and on the banks of the Market Weighton Canal.

According to the 2011 UK census, Newport parish had a population of 1,580, an increase on the 2001 UK census figure of 1,538.

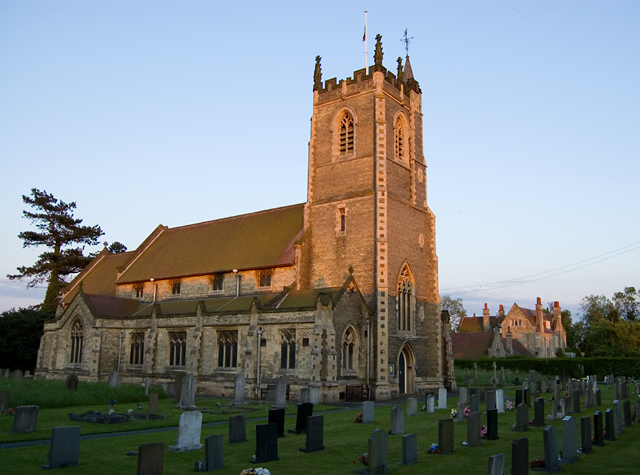
St Stephen's Church, Newport

Newport has a church, a school, a few shops, three public houses and two playing fields.

In 1823 Newport (then New Port with New Village, and the 'West Side' of the settlement), was partly in the parish of Eastrington, partly part of an extra-parochial area, and within the Wapentake and Liberty of Howdenshire, and the Wapentake of Harthill. In the early 1770s the area that became Newport was the uncultivated and barren Walling Fen. A clay bed 30 feet (9 m) deep, and adjacent to the present village, was found and dug to provide material for the production of bricks, tiles and earthenware. A quantity of 1,700,000 tiles and 2,000,000 bricks were being made annually by 1823. The village that had grown over 50 years attained a population of 339 and the Wallingfen Methodist Church, established 1814, with Sunday School to educate 200 poor children for Newport and surrounding villages. Occupations in 1823 for Newport, New Village and West Side, included nine farmers, two blacksmiths, seven brick and tile manufacturers, an earthenware manufacturer, two butchers, two carpenters, two coal merchants, three corn millers, five drapers, one of whom was a druggist, three grocers, two saddlers, two shoemakers, five tailors, eight master mariners, a bricklayer, a hair dresser, a sacking weaver & basket maker, two shopkeepers, a baker, a gardener, a schoolmaster, and the landlords of The Turk's Head, The King's Arms Inn, and The Crown & Anchor public houses. A packet boat conveyed goods and passengers by water to Hull and back once a week. A carrier conveyed goods and passengers by land to Hull, and to Howden, once a week. A mail coach ran to Hull and Doncaster daily.

The 1897–98 Anglican St Stephen's Church, Newport with Gilberdyke was designated a Grade II listed building in 1987.

Newport was served by Wallingfen railway station, formerly Newport, on the Hull and Barnsley Railway between 1885 and 1955.

== See also ==
- Listed buildings in Newport, East Riding of Yorkshire
