= Bentley, East Riding of Yorkshire =

Hamlet in the East Riding of Yorkshire, England

Coordinates: 53.809580°N 0.452685°W

Bentley
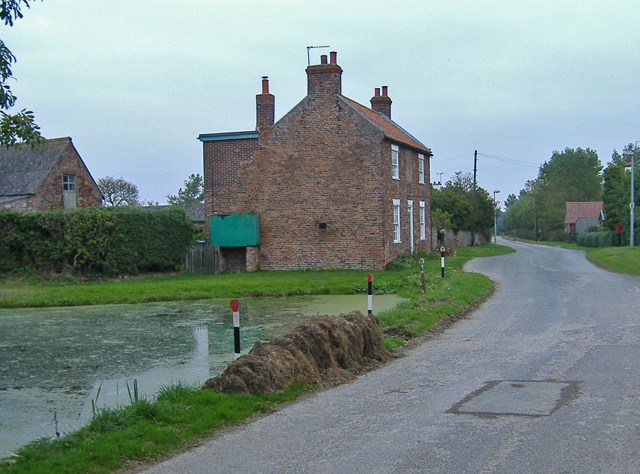
- Pond and house, Bentley

- Location within the East Riding of Yorkshire
- OS grid reference: TA019359
  - London: 160 mi (260 km) S
- Civil parish: Rowley
- Unitary authority: East Riding of Yorkshire
- Ceremonial county: East Riding of Yorkshire
- Region: Yorkshire and the Humber
- Country: England
- Sovereign state: United Kingdom
- Post town: BEVERLEY
- Postcode district: HU17
- Dialling code: 01482
- Police: Humberside
- Fire: Humberside
- Ambulance: Yorkshire
- UK Parliament: Goole and Pocklington

Bentley is a hamlet in the East Riding of Yorkshire, England. It is situated approximately 3 miles (5 km) south from the market town of Beverley, and to the west of the A164 road. Bentley forms part of the civil parish of Rowley.

Access to the hamlet from the main road is by agricultural vehicles only. Also known as "Little London" there are census records dating back to 1851, but it is believed that there were people living there long before that. There were about 220 from 1851 to 1948. Started as mainly farming land for the residents, more jobs developed over the years. As it became more industrial everyone fled. Located at sea level, Bentley has a fairly warm summer climate. The area's yearly temperature is 51.75°F. Bentley is 0.22% higher in temperature than the average of the United Kingdom. Bentley typically receives about 14.16 millimetres of precipitation. That is about 38.64 rainy days yearly. Its warmest month is August, reaching temperatures of 68 °F (20 °C). The coldest months are in January, reaching right above freezing temperatures at 36 °F (2 °C).
