= Rowley, East Riding of Yorkshire =

Village and civil parish in the East Riding of Yorkshire, England

Coordinates: 53.781666°N 0.517169°W

Rowley
- Location within the East Riding of Yorkshire
- Population: 1,015 (2011 census)
- OS grid reference: SE978327
- Civil parish: Rowley
- Unitary authority: East Riding of Yorkshire
- Ceremonial county: East Riding of Yorkshire
- Region: Yorkshire and the Humber
- Country: England
- Sovereign state: United Kingdom
- Post town: COTTINGHAM
- Postcode district: HU20
- Dialling code: 01482
- Police: Humberside
- Fire: Humberside
- Ambulance: Yorkshire
- UK Parliament: Goole and Pocklington

Rowley is a small village and civil parish in the East Riding of Yorkshire, England. It is situated 1 mile (1.6 km) south of Little Weighton and approximately 6 miles (9.7 km) south-west of Beverley town centre.

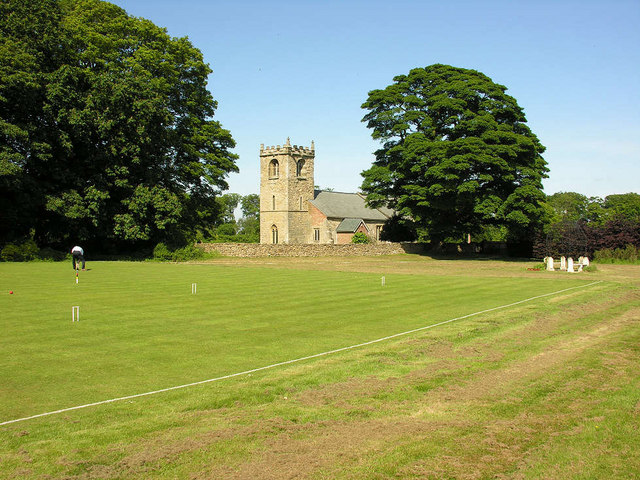
St Peter's Church, Rowley

The civil parish is formed by the villages of Rowley and Little Weighton together with the hamlets of Bentley, High Hunsley, Risby and part of the hamlet of Riplingham.

According to the 2011 UK census, Rowley parish had a population of 1,015, a decrease on the 2001 UK census figure of 1,030. The village of Rowley is now mostly depopulated, leaving only a few houses, and most of the population is now in Little Weighton.

== History ==
The name Rowley derives from the Old English rūhlēah meaning 'rough wood or clearing'.

Rev. Ezekiel Rogers, who became Rector of Rowley in 1621, was suspended from the parish church in 1638 for his non-conformist beliefs. Following this, he led 20 families to emigrate to the American colonies, where he founded the town of Rowley, Massachusetts in 1639. The emigrants sailed from Hull in John of London, probably a merchant ship of around 200 tons, probably in June 1638, arriving in Salem, Massachusetts in August.

One of those 20 families was the Grants, who are direct forebears of the model Jodie Kidd, as revealed in a 2008 edition of the BBC genealogy programme Who Do You Think You Are?.

Also among the 1638 emigrants were two brothers, Richard and Thomas Wickham. Samuel, a son of Thomas, settled in Rhode Island and became a Freeman of the Colony and a Deputy. Another descendant, Captain John Clements Wickham served on the Royal Navy ship HMS Beagle during its voyage with Charles Darwin and was later the first Magistrate and administrator of Queensland.

Rev. Levett Edward Thoroton, son of Col. Thomas Blackborne Thoroton Hildyard of Flintham Hall, Flintham, Nottinghamshire, was rector of Rowley for 23 years. He is commemorated by a tablet on the south aisle of St Peter's Church in Rowley. The Hildyard family had a long association with Rowley and its church, where they were patrons of the living. The local church contains many memorials to the family. The church was designated a Grade II* listed building in 1968 and is now recorded in the National Heritage List for England, maintained by Historic England.

== See also ==
- Listed buildings in Rowley, East Riding of Yorkshire
