= Listed buildings in South Cave =

South Cave is a civil parish in the county of the East Riding of Yorkshire, England. It contains 22 listed buildings that are recorded in the National Heritage List for England. Of these, one is listed at Grade II*, the middle of the three grades, and the others are at Grade II, the lowest grade. The parish contains the village of South Cave, the hamlet of Riplingham, and the surrounding countryside. Most of the listed buildings are houses and associated structures, and the others include a church, a public house, a market hall and school later a town hall, and a cemetery chapel and lychgate.

== Key ==
| Grade | Criteria |
|---|---|
| II* | Particularly important buildings of more than special interest |
| II | Buildings of national importance and special interest |

== Buildings ==
| Name and location | Photograph | Date | Notes | Grade |
|---|---|---|---|---|
| All Saints' Church; 53.76744°N 0.61159°W | | Mid-13th century | The church has been altered and enlarged through the centuries, including a series of restorations in the mid-19th century by J. L. Pearson. It is built in limestone, with freestone dressings and a slate roof. The church consists of a nave with a clerestory, a north aisle, a south porch, a south transept, a chancel with a north vestry, and a west tower. The tower has three stages, diagonal buttresses, a low plinth, a three-light pointed west window with a hood mould, a south clock face, two-light square-headed bell openings, and an embattled parapet. | II* |
| House opposite the east end of Bacchus Lane; 53.76730°N 0.60035°W | — | Early to mid-18th century (probable) | The house is in colourwashed limestone, with brick dressings, a stepped brick eaves cornice, and a pantile roof with tumbled-in brick to the raised gables. There is one storey and attics, and three bays. On the front are a doorway and horizontally sliding two-light sash windows. | II |
| Fox and Coney Public House; 53.76999°N 0.60068°W | | 1739 | The public house is in colourwashed brick and stone, and has a pantile roof with tumbled-in brick to the right raised gable. There are two storeys and three bays, the middle bay projecting slightly. In the centre is a doorway with a narrow fanlight under a flat gauged brick arch with a projecting dated keystone. This is flanked by bow windows, and on the upper floor are sash windows. | II |
| 27 Pinfold; 53.76300°N 0.61829°W | — | Mid-18th century | The house is in stone, and has a pantile roof with tumbled-in brick to the raised gables. There is one storey and an attic, and two bays. The doorway is flanked by horizontally sliding sash windows, all under flat arches, and to the right is a casement window under a timber lintel. | II |
| 6 Church Hill; 53.76687°N 0.61248°W | | Mid to late 18th century | The house is rendered and colourwashed, with a timber eaves cornice, and a pantile roof with raised coped gables on shaped kneelers. There are two storeys and four bays. The doorway has pilasters, and the windows are sashes. | II |
| 7 and 8 Church Hill; 53.76696°N 0.61233°W | | Mid to late 18th century | The house is rendered, on a shallow plinth, with stone dressings, vermiculated quoins, and a pantile roof. There are two storeys and three bays. The central doorway has pilasters and a fanlight, and the windows are sashes with projecting carved keystones. | II |
| 83 Market Place; 53.77006°N 0.60112°W | — | Mid to late 18th century | A house in colourwashed brick, with a tile roof and tumbled-in brick to the raised gable on the right. There are two storeys and three bays. The central doorway has pilasters, and the windows are sashes under flat wedge lintels. | II |
| Weedley Farmhouse; 53.77736°N 0.54864°W | — | Mid to late 18th century | The house is in red brick, with stone dressings, a stepped brick eaves cornice, and a tile roof with raised coped gables. There are two storeys and five bays, and a later extension to the left with two storeys and two bays. The central doorway has a fanlight, and a pediment on decorated consoles, and the windows are sashes. | II |
| 61 Church Street; 53.76765°N 0.60452°W | — | Late 18th century | The house is in stone, with brick dressings, a dentilled brick eaves cornice, and a pantile roof with tumbled-in brick to the left gable. There are two storeys and three bays. On the front is a doorway and sash windows, all under flat arches. | II |
| 54–56 Market Place; 53.77009°N 0.60076°W | | Late 18th century | A house, later part of a public house, in red brick, with a timber eaves cornice, and a pantile roof with tumbled-in brick to the raised gables. There are two storeys and four bays. On the front are two doorways with divided fanlights, and on the right is a carriage entrance with an elliptical arch and a projecting keystone on impost blocks. The windows, which are sashes, and the doorways have gauged brick arches with projecting keystones. | II |
| 79 and 81 Market Place; 53.76995°N 0.60104°W | — | Late 18th century | A house, later two shops, in brick, with a pantile roof and tumbled-in brick to the raised gables on shaped kneelers. There are two storeys and five bays, the middle bay projecting slightly. The ground floor contains two shopfronts with pilasters, and the windows are sashes under flat gauged brick arches. | II |
| 66 West End; 53.76647°N 0.61268°W | | Late 18th century | The house is in brick-sized limestone with a pantile roof. There are two storeys and three bays. The central doorway has a fanlight, the windows are sashes, and all the openings are under flat arches. | II |
| Market Place Farmhouse; 53.76905°N 0.60024°W | | Late 18th century | The house is in limestone, with brick dressings and a slate roof. There are two storeys and three bays. The doorway is in the centre, the windows are sashes, and all are under flat arches. | II |
| Town Hall; 53.76956°N 0.60038°W | | 1796 | Originally a market hall with a school above, later the town hall, it is in yellow brick on a plinth, with stone dressings, a floor band, dentilled eaves and raked cornices, and a hipped slate roof. There are two storeys and three bays, the middle bay projecting under a pediment. Steps lead up to a ground floor loggia with three round arches, the middle arch wider. Above the middle arch is an oval inscribed and dated cartouche. The upper floor contains sash windows, the middle one tripartite. On the roof is a four-sided bell turret added in 1897, with a clock face on three sides and an inscription on the other. Above is an open octagonal belfry, and a baroque dome with a ball finial and a weathervane. | II |
| Cave Castle; 53.76795°N 0.61075°W | | 1802–09 | The house was extensively remodelled in the later 19th century, and later converted into a hotel. It is in white brick with stone dressings and a hipped slate roof, and is embattled throughout, with a square plan and polygonal corner turrets. The entrance front has three storeys and four bays. In the centre is a three-storey porch with diagonal buttresses, and a pointed doorway in a flat-headed surround with ornate roundels in the spandrels. Above is a two-storey canted oriel window, and a coped gable with a coat of arms and a cross finial. The outer bays contain mullioned windows and floor bands. The garden front has two storeys and five bays, and contains a two-storey canted bay window. | II |
| Stable block, Cave Castle; 53.76885°N 0.61100°W | — | Early 19th century | The stable block is in yellow brick with slate roofs. In the centre is an embattled block with two storeys and three bays, the middle bay a projecting three-storey tower, and flanking lower four-bay wings. The tower has a pointed doorway in a larger pointed opening, above which is a coat of arms, paired lancet windows, a square -headed opening, and a dentilled cornice. On the roof is an octagonal timber cupola with a copper dome and a ball finial. The outer bays contain pointed doorways and sash windows. | II |
| Holderness House; 53.76947°N 0.60038°W | | Early 19th century | The house is in grey brick, with a sill band, a timber eaves cornice, and a hipped slate roof. There are two storeys and four bays. On the second bay is a doorway with pilasters, a fanlight, panelled reveals and a soffit, and on the extreme left is a doorway with a fanlight, and a channelled wedge lintel with a projecting fluted keystone. The right bay contains a canted bay window, and the other windows are sashes under cambered channelled wedge lintels with projecting fluted keystones. | II |
| East Lodge and walls, Cave Castle; 53.77295°N 0.60249°W | | Mid to late 19th century | The entrance lodge is in white brick on a plinth, with stone dressings, and is entirely embattled. The carriage arch is four-centred, with a lower pedestrian arch to the left, over which is a panel with a coat of arms, and above the arches are false machicolations. To the left is a square tower with a dentilled cornice, containing a single-light window under a three-light window, both with hood moulds, and attached to the left is an octagonal turret. To the right of the arches is an octagonal turret with a dentilled cornice. On both sides are screen walls ending in square piers with cornices, on which are statues of bears. | II |
| West Lodge and walls, Cave Castle; 53.76710°N 0.61189°W | | c. 1870 | The lodge is in yellow brick with stone dressings, and it is entirely embattled. The carriage arch is four-centred, and above it are false machicolations. To the right is a square turret containing a pedestrian arch, above which is a panel with a coat of arms, and a dentilled cornice. To the left of the carriage arch are two square towers and a taller connecting turret. The towers contain casement windows and have dentilled cornices, and the right tower has a panel with a coat of arms. Outside the towers are embattled screen walls ending in square abutments with low pyramidal caps. | II |
| Cemetery Chapel; 53.77548°N 0.60493°W | | 1873 | The cemetery chapel is in limestone, with dressings in red brick and stone, and a red tile roof with moulded ridge tiles and a cross finial. It consists of a single cell with an apse at the east end, and north and south gabled porches. At the west end is a large three-light pointed window, above which is a tall gabled bellcote on corbels, containing a pointed arch. | II |
| Lychgate and wall, South Cave Cemetery; 53.77546°N 0.60426°W | | 1873 | The lychgate has walls in limestone with brick and stone dressings, on which are wooden piers with arch braces carrying a tile roof. It is flanked by curved stone walls with curved brick coping, ending in square brick piers with stone pyramidal caps. The gates are in wood with quatrefoil panels. | II |
| Gate piers, Everthorpe Hall; 53.76855°N 0.63235°W | | c. 1875 | The gate piers each has a base in rusticated gritstone, on which is a stone plinth and a large carved statue of a lion in limestone. | II |
