= Wallingfen Methodist Church =

Chapel in Newport, East Riding of Yorkshire, England

Coordinates: 53°45′45″N 0°42′03″W

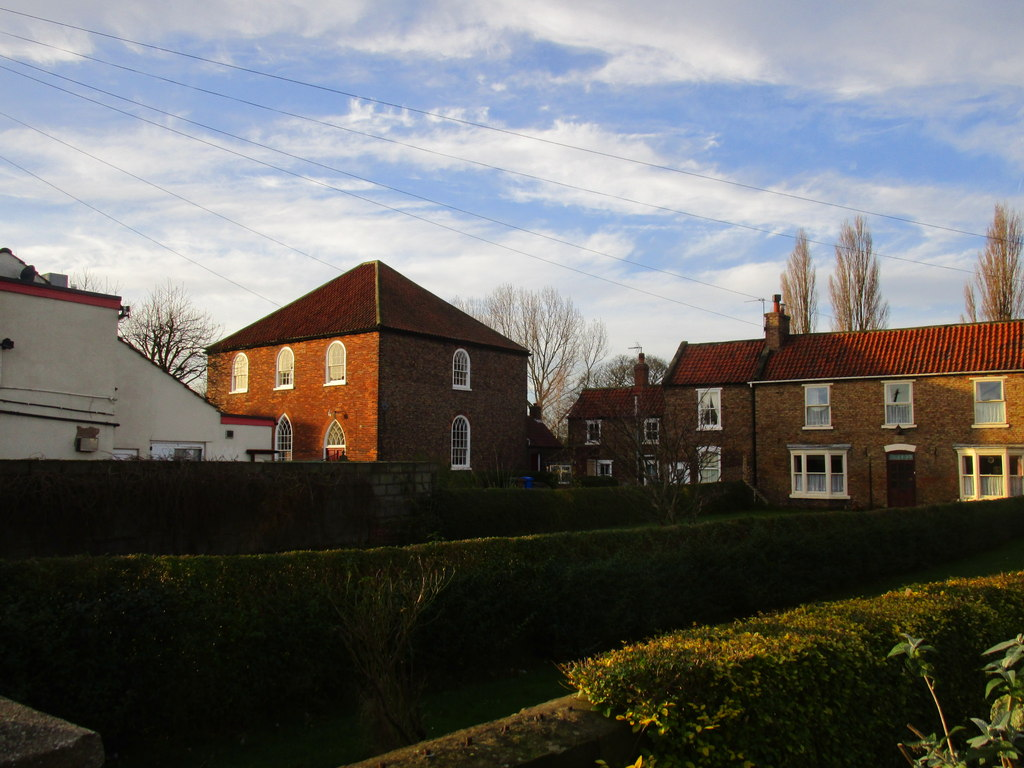
The church, in 2014

Wallingfen Methodist Church is a historic chapel near Newport, East Riding of Yorkshire, a village in England.

The chapel was built between 1811 and 1812, for the Wesleyan Methodist Church. By 1851, it could seat 296 worshippers, and had a weekly attendance of around 250 across two services. Nikolaus Pevsner praised the design of the building as the best village chapel in the East Riding. It was grade II listed in 1987.

The chapel is built of brick with a hipped pantile roof. It has two storeys and is three bays wide. On the centre of the ground floor is a sash window with a pointed head, flanked by doorways with pointed fanlights. The upper floor contains sash windows with round-arched fanlights. All the openings are under gauged brick arches. Inside, there is a panelled gallery supported by Tuscan order columns, and an altarpiece with a panel behind, reached up steps.

== See also ==
- Listed buildings in Newport, East Riding of Yorkshire
