= Ralph Ellerker =

16th-century English politician

Sir Ralph Ellerker (died 1546) of Risby, Yorkshire was an English soldier, knight and Member of Parliament. He served as High Sheriff of Yorkshire for 1529–30 and represented Yorkshire in the parliament of 1542.

== Career ==
Ellerker was the eldest son of Sir Ralph Ellerker of Risby, Yorkshire, by Anne, daughter of Sir Thomas Gower of Stittenham. The elder Ellerker took part in the useless Spanish expedition in 1512, was an esquire of the king's body, received a salary as one of the king's spears of honour, and died in 1540. Both father and son were knighted in 1513 by the Earl of Surrey at Flodden Field. Whether it was he or his son who represented Scarborough in the parliament of 1529 is uncertain.

The younger Ellerker was introduced to the court and demonstrated his prowess at tournaments. He was one of the knights who accompanied Henry VIII to his meeting in 1520 with Francis I of France at the Field of the Cloth of Gold. Ellerker was also appointed to be gentleman in the household of Henry FitzRoy, Duke of Richmond and Somerset.

He was appointed chief steward of the lordships of Cotingham and Rise in 1522, and from that time onward frequently was on the commission of the peace for the East Riding. He was pricked High Sheriff of Yorkshire for 1529–30. He was on the royal commission to treat for redress of outrages in the west marches in 1531, when he also served on a commission for the reform of the weirs and fishgarths in Yorkshire. In 1533 he was busy in the north mustering troops and fighting, and in July of that year he was one of the English commissioners who concluded a year's truce with Scotland.

He was returned as knight of the shire for Yorkshire for the parliament of 1542. In that year he was also head of a commission appointed to survey the waste grounds on the border, to describe the condition of 'all castells, towers, barmekins, and fortresses,' and to advise on the best means for strengthening the defences and peopling the district. The official report of this commission is preserved among the Harleian MSS. (292, ff. 97–123). In the same year Ellerker was one of the council at Calais, and in 1544 he was marshal of the English army in Boulogne when that town was captured. He distinguished himself by taking the crest from the dauphin of France. He returned to England in January 1545–6, but in April was at Boulogne again, and died there in battle in that month.

He was buried in the church of St. Mary at Boulogne. He had married Joan, daughter of John or Thomas Arden, by whom he had a son, Ralph. Ralph was High Sheriff of Yorkshire in 1529, was knighted by Henry VIII for winning an ensign in France, but was killed by the French on 1 August 1550.
