= Wallingfen railway station =

Disused railway station in the East Riding of Yorkshire, England

Wallingfen
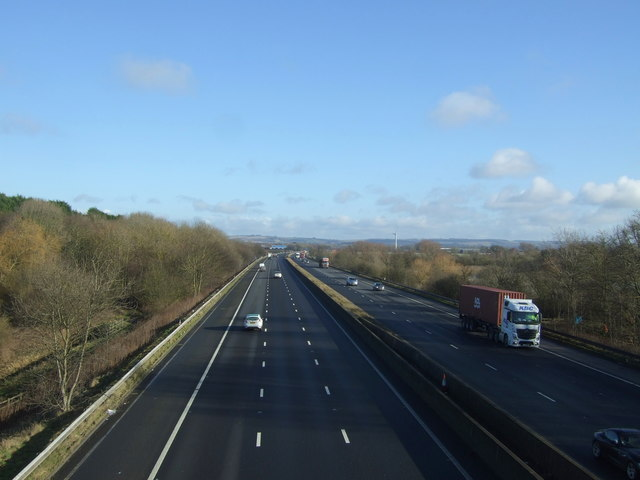
- Looking east along the M62 across the site of the former station (2018)

General information
- Location: Newport, East Riding of Yorkshire; England
- Coordinates: 53.766700°N 0.710300°W
- Grid reference: SE848308
- Platforms: 2

Other information
- Status: Disused

History
- Original company: Hull, Barnsley and West Riding Junction Railway
- Pre-grouping: Hull and Barnsley Railway
- Post-grouping: London and North Eastern Railway

Key dates
- 27 July 1885: Opened
- 1 August 1955: Closed to passengers
- 1959: Closed for freight
Location

Wallingfen railway station was a station on the Hull and Barnsley Railway, and served the village of Newport in the East Riding of Yorkshire, England.

The station opened on 27 July 1885 as Newport for goods traffic, and a week later it opened to passengers. It was renamed Newport (Yorks) in September 1921 and on 1 July 1923 to Wallingfen to avoid confusion with others stations titled Newport. It closed to passengers on 1 August 1955 and closed completely on 6 April 1959. The station has been demolished, and a section of the M62 motorway was built over the railway alignment in the 1970s.

Preceding station	Disused railways	Following station
Sandholme	Hull and Barnsley Railway	North Cave
