= St Nicholas' Church, Newbald =

Church in North Newbald, East Riding of Yorkshire, England

Coordinates: 53.8175°N 0.6165°W

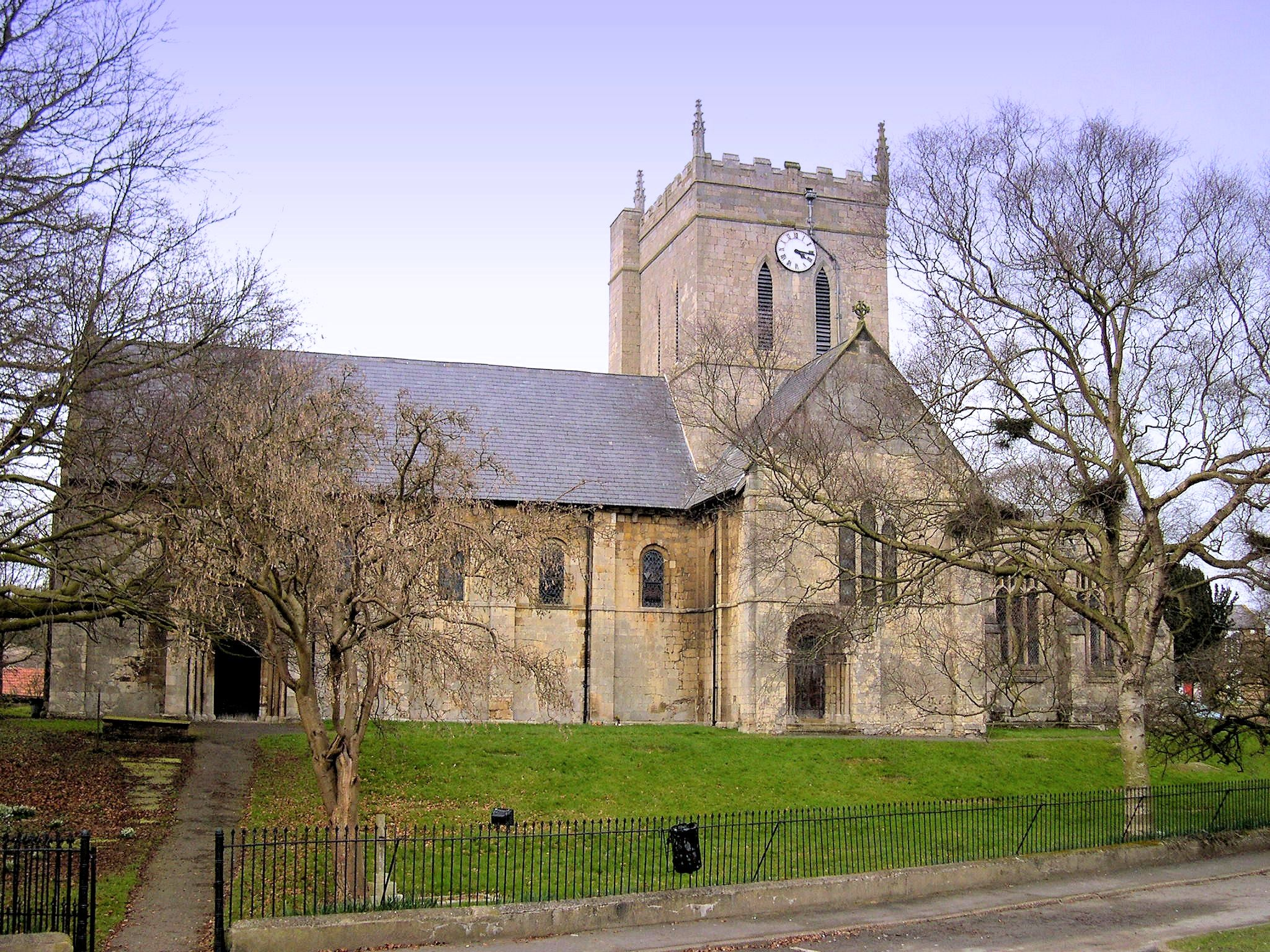
The church, in 2005

St Nicholas' Church is the parish church of North Newbald, a village in the East Riding of Yorkshire, in England.

The church was built around 1140, from which period the nave, transepts and lower part of the tower survive. A belfry was added to the tower in the early 13th century, while in the 15th century the chancel was rebuilt and a vestry added. The church was restored in 1864, 1875 and from 1891 to 1892. The building was grade I listed in 1968.

The church is built of stone with a slate roof, and has a cruciform plan, consisting of a nave, north and south transepts, a chancel with a north vestry, and a tower at the crossing with a northwest stair turret. The tower has three stages, twin chamfered lancet bell openings, clock faces, a double-chamfered string course, and an embattled parapet with corner crocketed pinnacles. The remaining Norman features include four doorways, flat buttresses, and some of the windows. On the nave is a carved corbel table with grotesque faces and beasts. Inside, there is a 12th-century tub font and a monument to William Gill, who died in 1723.

== See also ==
- Grade I listed buildings in the East Riding of Yorkshire
- Listed buildings in Newbald
