= St Stephen's Church, Newport with Gilberdyke =

Church in Newport, East Riding of Yorkshire, England

Coordinates: 53°45′27″N 0°42′46″W

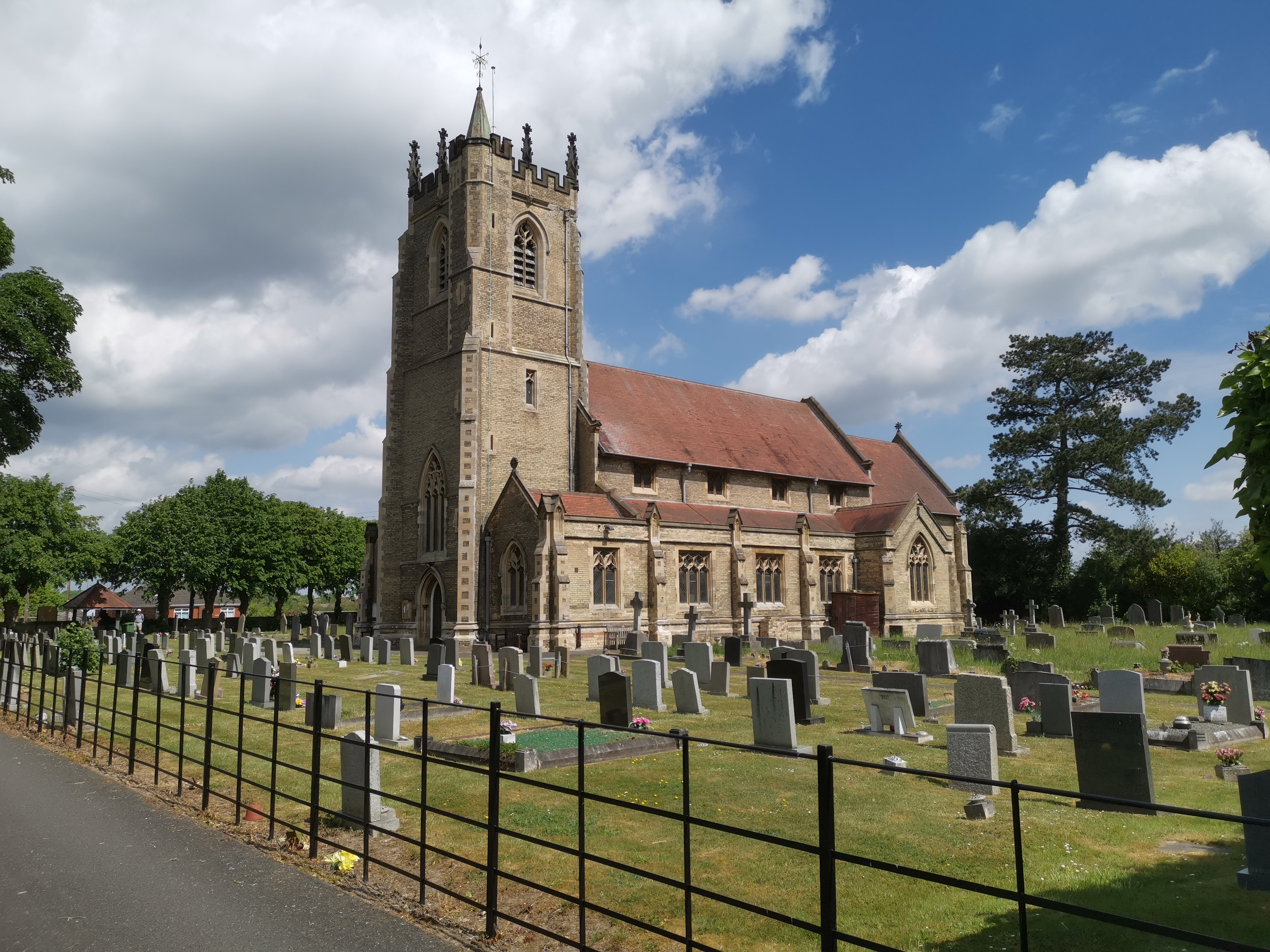
The church, in 2020

St Stephen's Church is the parish church of Newport, East Riding of Yorkshire, a village in England, also serving the neighbouring village of Gilberdyke.

Newport was long in the parish of St Michael's Church, Eastrington. In 1897, T. S. Whitaker of Everthorpe Hall paid £7,000 to construct a substantial church in the village. It was designed by Smith, Brodrick & Lowther and was completed in 1899. The building was grade II listed in 1987.

The church is built of yellow brick, with stone dressings and a red tile roof. It consists of a nave with a clerestory, north and south aisles, north and south transepts, a chancel with a south vestry, and a west tower embraced by the aisles. The tower has five stages, with diagonal buttresses, a southwest stair turret on the upper two stages, a pointed west doorway over which is a three-light pointed window, two-light pointed bell openings, and an embattled parapet with crocketed corner pinnacles. Inside, the original tiles in the chancel survive, designed by William Godwin, while the east window has stained glass designed by Clayton and Bell.

== See also ==
- Listed buildings in Newport, East Riding of Yorkshire
