= Little Weighton railway station =

Disused railway station in the East Riding of Yorkshire, England

Little Weighton
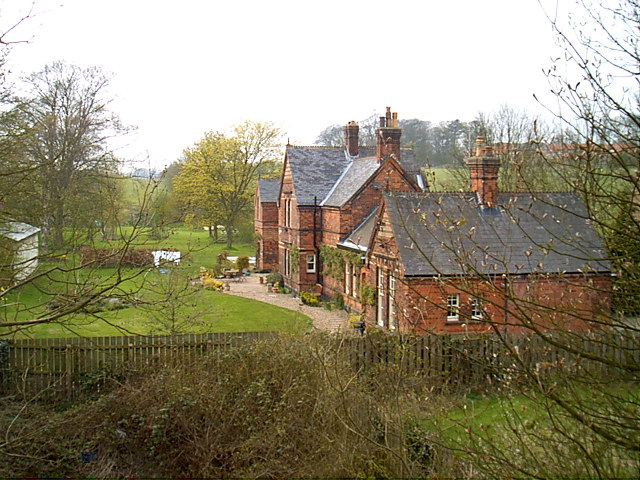
- Station in 2005

General information
- Location: Little Weighton, East Riding of Yorkshire; England
- Coordinates: 53.7882°N 0.5103°W
- Grid reference: SE982335
- Platforms: 2

Other information
- Status: Disused

History
- Original company: Hull, Barnsley and West Riding Junction Railway
- Pre-grouping: Hull and Barnsley Railway
- Post-grouping: London and North Eastern Railway

Key dates
- 1885: opened
- 1955: closed to passengers
- 1964: closed for freight
Location

Little Weighton railway station was a station on the Hull and Barnsley Railway, and served the village of Little Weighton in the East Riding of Yorkshire, England.

The station opened on 27 July 1885, closed to passengers on 1 August 1955 and closed completely on 6 July 1964.

Preceding station	Disused railways	Following station
South Cave	Hull and Barnsley Railway	Willerby and Kirk Ella
