= South Cave Town Hall =

Municipal building in South Cave, East Riding of Yorkshire, England

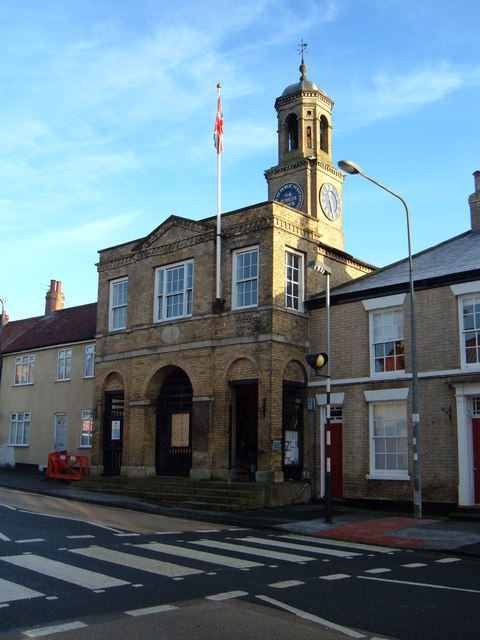
- South Cave Town Hall

- Shown in East Riding of Yorkshire
- 53.7695°N 0.6004°W
- Location: Market Place, South Cave

History
- Built: 1796

Site notes
- Architectural style: Neoclassical style

Listed Building – Grade II
- Official name: Market Hall, Market Place
- Designated: 7 February 1988
- Reference no.: 1203447

South Cave Town Hall is a municipal building in the Market Place, South Cave, East Riding of Yorkshire, England. The building, which is the meeting place of South Cave Parish Council, is a Grade II listed building.

== History ==
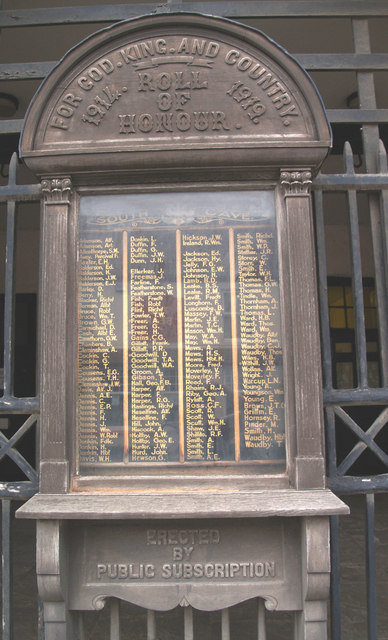
Roll of Honour on the external wall of the Town Hall

The building was commissioned by a barrister at Lincoln's Inn, Henry Boldero Barnard, who had established his family home at Cave Castle, a property which had been built for him in 1787. Barnard decided to cement his place as the local lord of the manor by procuring a market hall for the parish of South Cave.

The new building was designed in the neoclassical style, built in yellow brick with ashlar stone dressings and was completed in 1796. It was arcaded on the ground floor, so that markets could be held, with an assembly room on the first floor. The design involved a symmetrical main frontage with three bays facing onto the Market Place; the central bay, which slightly projected forward, featured a large opening on the ground floor with an oval cartouche above inscribed with the words "Erected in the year 1796". There was a central three-part sash window with glazing bars on the first floor and, at roof level, a dentiled pediment with a cartouche, containing a floral motif, in the tympanum. The outer bays contained narrower openings on the ground floor, sash windows on the first floor and a dentilled cornice above. Internally, the principal room was the assembly hall on the first floor which was initially used as a room for collecting rents.

The assembly room on the first floor of the building, which at the time was referred to as the "Market Cross Hall", was also used as a classroom for the local school which became known as "the Cross School", recalling the name of the building. The rear of the building was fitted out so that it could be used as a home by the schoolmaster and his family. In 1804, the Yorkshire diarist, Robert Sharp, was appointed schoolmaster and he often referred to the building and the school in his diaries. A central bell tower, which was surmounted by an octagonal belfry, a Baroque style dome and a weather vane, was installed in the centre of the roof in 1897. The bell tower contained a clock, designed and manufactured by Potts of Leeds, which displayed clock faces on the back and the sides and a large circular plaque on the front; the plaque recorded the fact that the bell tower was commissioned to commemorate the Diamond Jubilee of Queen Victoria.

South Cave Parish Council, which was formed in 1896, first used the market hall as its meeting place from 1906. After the First World War, a roll of honour was installed on the front of the town hall to commemorate the service of local people who had taken part in the war. In 1935, as part of events intended to commemorate the Silver Jubilee of George V, the original faces of the clock were replaced with illuminated dials, the lighting for which was financed by public subscription.

A programme of refurbishment works was undertaken at the town hall in 2010: the works involved enclosing the openings on the ground floor with glass, as well as relocating the roll of honour from the front of the building to the south side of the building.

== See also ==
- Listed buildings in South Cave
