= Listed buildings in Newport, East Riding of Yorkshire =

Newport is a civil parish in the county of the East Riding of Yorkshire, England. It contains six listed buildings that are recorded in the National Heritage List for England. All the listed buildings are designated at Grade II, the lowest of the three grades, which is applied to "buildings of national importance and special interest". The parish contains the village of Newport and the surrounding area. The listed buildings consist of houses, a chapel, its meeting room and gates, and a church.

== Buildings ==
Name and location	Photograph	Date	Notes
4, 5 and 6 Canal Side East; 53.76211°N 0.70202°W		Late 18th century	A terrace of three houses in colourwashed brick, with a dentilled eaves course, and a pantile roof with coped gables and shaped kneelers. There are two storeys and five bays, the middle three bays higher. On the ground floor are doorways, two with fanlights, two with wedge lintels, one under a segmental arch, and on the extreme left is a round-arched passage entry. The windows are sashes, three on the ground floor with wedge lintels, and one under a segmental arch.
Methodist Church Rooms; 53.76217°N 0.70080°W		1789	A Methodist church, later used for other purposes, it is in brick and has a pantile roof with raised gable ends and shaped kneelers. There are two storeys and four bays. The ground floor doorways and the windows on both floors have segmental heads. On the front is a brass plate in memorial of those lost in the first World War, above is a clock face, and on the roof is a gabled bellcote. The gable end ties form the date of building.
Wallingfen Methodist Chapel; 53.76242°N 0.70095°W		1814	The chapel is in brick with a hipped pantile roof. There are two storeys and three bays. On the centre of the ground floor is a sash window with a pointed head, flanked by doorways with pointed fanlights. The upper floor contains sash windows with round-arched fanlights. All the openings are under gauged brick arches.
Gates, Wallingfen Methodist Chapel; 53.76221°N 0.70065°W	—	1814	The gates at the entrance to the grounds of the chapel are in wrought iron. The gate posts have a semicircular motif and urn finials, and the gates and railings have wavy dogbars, a circular motif to the band and a star motif to the finials of the standards. There is a later overthrow and lamp holder.
Newport Grange; 53.76152°N 0.70458°W	—	Early 19th century	The house is in grey brick, and has hipped roofs in Westmorland and Welsh slate. There are two storeys, a main block of three bays, a rear cross-wing, and a wing to the left under a separate roof. On the front is a doorway with a radial fanlight, and a Tuscan doorcase carrying a wrought iron balustrade. The windows are sashes, some tripartite, and all have wedge lintels with fluted keystones.
St Stephen's Church; 53.75759°N 0.71259°W		1897–99	The church is in yellow brick, with stone dressings and a red tile roof. It consists of a nave with a clerestory, north and south aisles, north and south transepts, a chancel with a south vestry, and a west tower embraced by the aisles. The tower has five stages, with diagonal buttresses, a southwest stair turret on the upper two stages, a pointed west doorway over which is a three-light pointed window, two-light pointed bell openings, and an embattled parapet with crocketed corner pinnacles.
