= Skidby Windmill =

Yorkshire listed windmill

Coordinates: 53°47′10″N 0°27′10″W

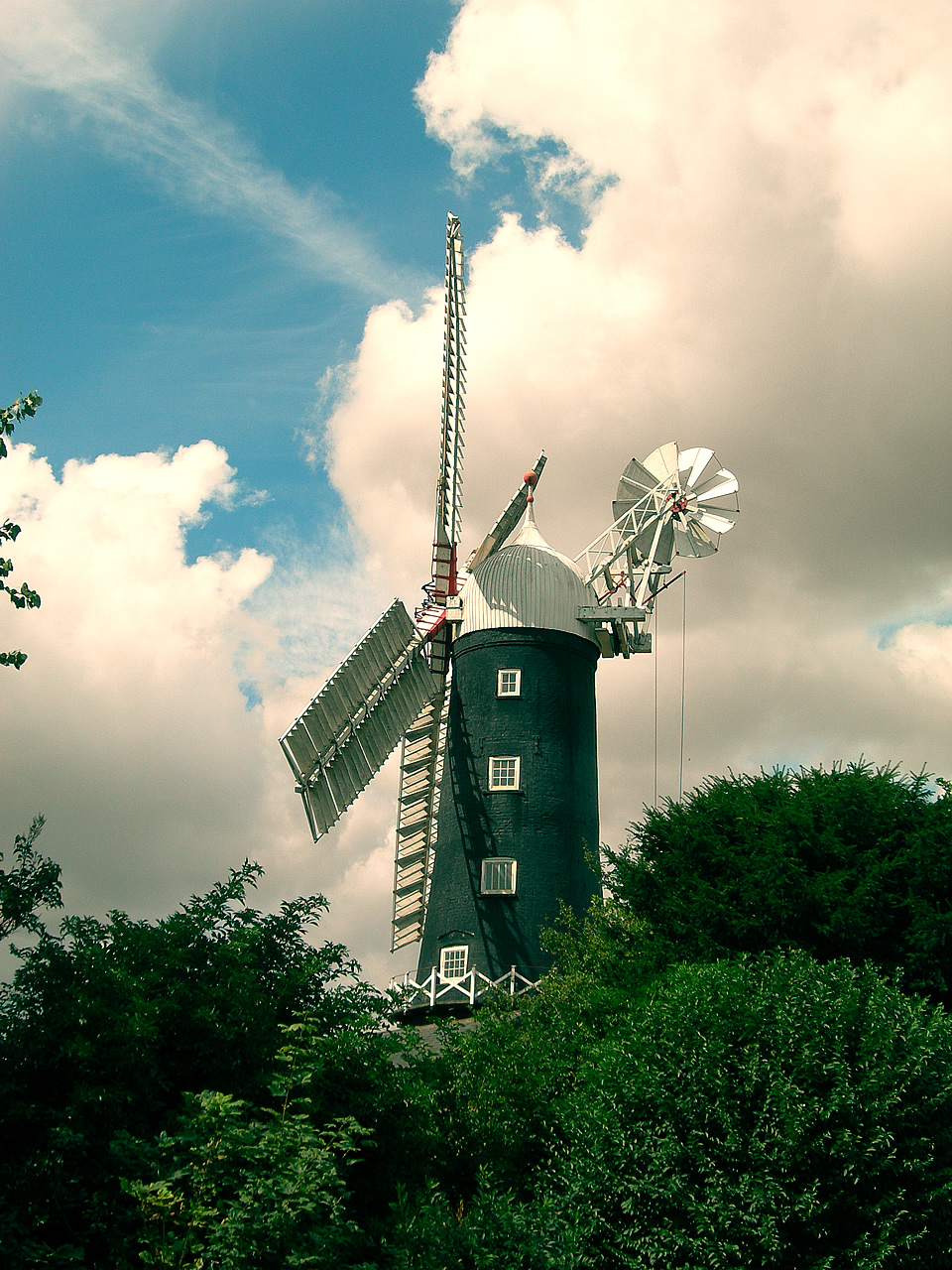
Skidby Mill is a Grade II listed building

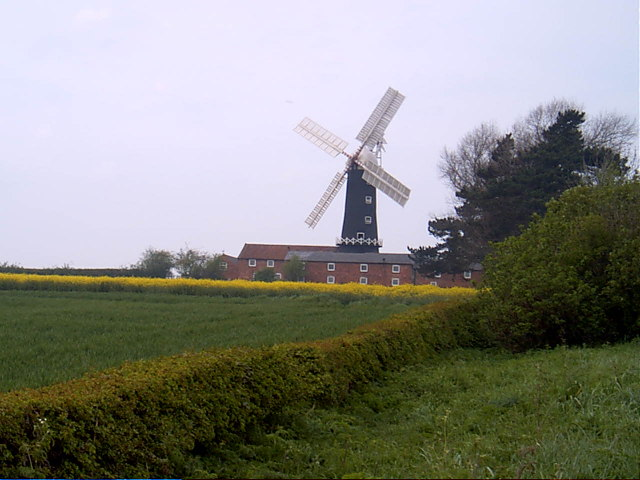
Skidby Working Windmill

Skidby Windmill is a Grade II* listed windmill at Skidby near Beverley, in the East Riding of Yorkshire, England.

Originally built in 1821, the mill was further extended to reach its current five-story height in 1870. Powered by four sails measuring 11 metres (36 feet) in length, it remained in commercial operation until 1966. Between 1954 and 1966, the mill transitioned to grinding animal feedstuff using newly installed electric rollers, while also continuing to stoneground flour. In 1969, the mill was sold to the local council for a mere £1. After undergoing renovation, it reopened in 1974 as a working museum.

This historic site holds the distinction of being the last operational English windmill north of the Humber, specializing in the production of wholemeal flour sourced from locally grown wheat. Open to visitors throughout the week, milling activities occur from Wednesday to Sunday, weather permitting. Adjacent warehouses contain the Museum of East Riding Rural Life, featuring notable exhibits such as the 'Wolds Wagon' built by P. H. Sissons & Sons, which was originally lent to the Beverley Army Museum of transport. P. H. Sissons & Sons were based at Beswick and built wagons from 1854 onwards.

In 2008, restoration efforts commenced on the mill, focusing on the replacement of certain structural elements within the cap and fantail. The work involved the 15 ton cap being removed by a crane; the only time that the cap has been removed since the 1870s.

Further refurbishment started in late-2019, with the removal of the sails and fantail which were transported to Norfolk for restoration. In July 2020, roof and window repairs were to be undertaken followed by painting of the tower which would take three months to complete. The sails and fantail were to be returned to the mill in early 2021, but 2 of the sails had wet rot and had to be replaced with replicas.

== See also ==
- List of windmills in the East Riding of Yorkshire
- Grade II* listed buildings in the East Riding of Yorkshire
- Listed buildings in Skidby
