= North Newbald =

Village in the East Riding of Yorkshire, England

Coordinates: 53°49′08″N 0°36′57″W

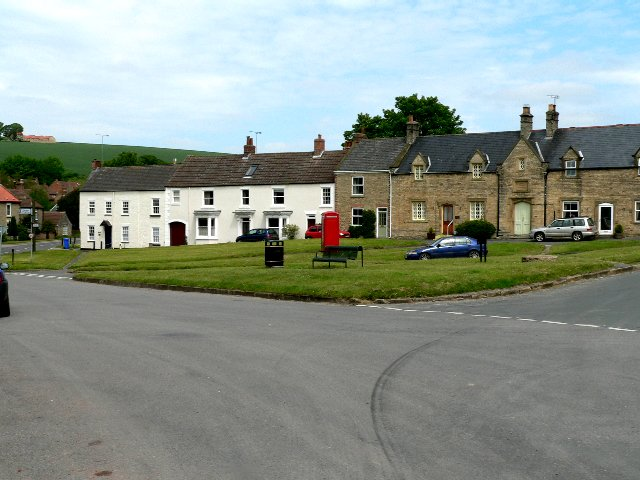
- North Newbald village green

- Location within the East Riding of Yorkshire
- OS grid reference: SE912366
  - London: 160 mi (260 km) S
- Civil parish: Newbald
- Unitary authority: East Riding of Yorkshire
- Ceremonial county: East Riding of Yorkshire
- Region: Yorkshire and the Humber
- Country: England
- Sovereign state: United Kingdom
- Post town: YORK
- Postcode district: YO43
- Dialling code: 01430
- Police: Humberside
- Fire: Humberside
- Ambulance: Yorkshire
- UK Parliament: Beverley and Holderness

North Newbald is a village and former civil parish, now in the parish of Newbald, in the East Riding of Yorkshire, England. The village is situated approximately 13 miles (20 km) north-west of Hull city centre, 3 miles (5 km) north of South Cave and 3.5 miles (6 km) south of Market Weighton. It lies to the east of the A1034 road.

== History ==
The name Newbald derives from the Old English nīwebōðl meaning 'new dwelling'.

In 1823 North Newbald was a village and civil parish in the Wapentake of Harthill and the Liberty of St Peter's. The North Newbald civil parish contained the hamlet of South Newbald. A stretch of land was purchased to provide a rental which was "distributed every New Year's Day to 20 resident parishioners, who have never received parochial relief". Population at the time was 543, with occupations including six farmers, two blacksmiths, two bricklayers, two shopkeepers, and a tailor, and the public house landlords of The Tiger; The New Inn, who was also a butcher; and The Rose & Crown, who was also a corn miller. Resident in the village were fourteen yeomen, and the schoolmaster who was a collector of taxes. A carrier operated between the village and Hull twice a week, and Market Weighton and Beverley once a week.

== Governance ==
The village was in the Haltemprice and Howden parliamentary constituency until the 2010 general election when it was transferred to the constituency of Beverley and Holderness.

In 1866 North Newbald became a civil parish, on 1 April 1935 the parish was abolished to form "Newbald". In 1931 the parish had a population of 531.

== Community ==
North Newbald is a village consisting of about 800 people of all ages. The village has two public houses, The Tiger Inn and The Gnu (originally the New Inn when owned by The Hull Brewery Company), situated across the road from each other, privately run businesses and a number of farms. The main occupations in Newbald involve farming, eggs, warehousing and transport. It has been a carting village for some centuries.

Located on the communal village green is the whipping post used in the last public flogging carried out in Britain.

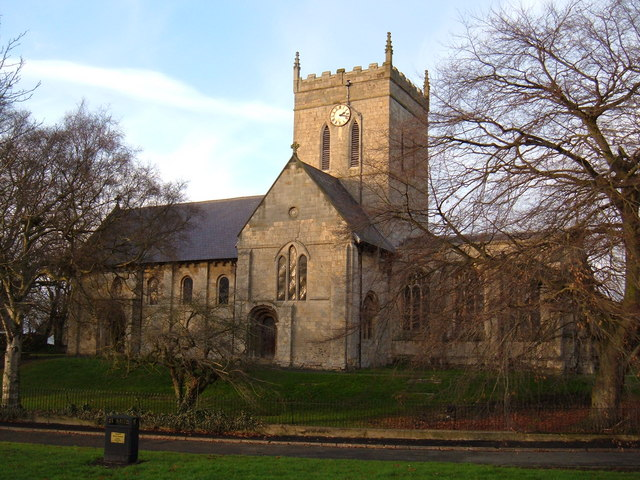
St Nicholas' Church, North Newbald

The Anglican St Nicholas' Church, Newbald was designated a Grade I listed building in 1968 and is now recorded in the National Heritage List for England, maintained by Historic England. Built about 1140, it was described by Nikolaus Pevsner as "the most complete Norman Church in the East Riding". It has a cruciform plan without aisles and with a tall central tower. Four Norman doorways make the building rare. Pevsner describes the church as the most complete Norman church in the East Riding. The church has a Coronation Clock which was installed at the coronation of George V in 1911.

A previous vicar of Newbald, Rev Jack Walker, during his incumbency mapped the whole area and produced detailed drawings suggesting that the village may have been walled. Apart from Rev Walker's submissions there is no further evidence of this.

The Yorkshire Wolds Way National Trail, a long distance footpath passes to the east of the village.

Buses run about three times a week to Beverley.

Three local sporting teams play at the village playing fields: Newbald Utd, Newbald A.F.C., and Newbald North End F.C.

== See also ==
- Listed buildings in Newbald
