= HMS Riplingham =

Minesweeper of the Royal Navy

History

United Kingdom
- Name: HMS Riplingham
- Namesake: Riplingham
- Builder: Brooke Marine
- Launched: 11 January 1955
- Completed: 1 July 1955
- Fate: Transferred to France, 1955

France
- Name: Myosotis
- Acquired: 1955
- Stricken: 1985

General characteristics
- Class & type: Ham-class minesweeper
- Notes: Pennant number(s): M2725 / IMS62

HMS Riplingham was a Ham-class minesweeper of the Royal Navy.

Their names were all chosen from villages ending in -ham. The minesweeper was named after Riplingham in the East Riding of Yorkshire.
