= Eppleworth =

Hamlet in the East Riding of Yorkshire, England

Coordinates: 53.774332°N 0.462327°W

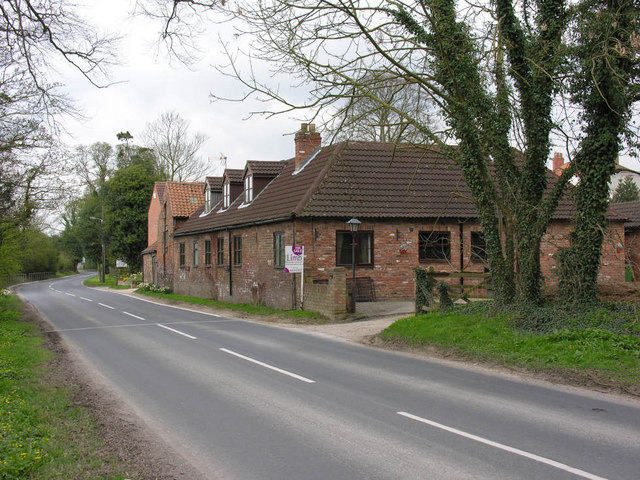

- Location within the East Riding of Yorkshire
- OS grid reference: TA014319
  - London: 155 mi (249 km) S
- Civil parish: Skidby
- Unitary authority: East Riding of Yorkshire
- Ceremonial county: East Riding of Yorkshire
- Region: Yorkshire and the Humber
- Country: England
- Sovereign state: United Kingdom
- Post town: COTTINGHAM
- Postcode district: HU16
- Dialling code: 01482
- Police: Humberside
- Fire: Humberside
- Ambulance: Yorkshire
- UK Parliament: Goole and Pocklington

Eppleworth is a hamlet in the East Riding of Yorkshire, England. It is situated on Westfields Road and lies 1 mile (1.6 km) to the south of Skidby and 2 miles (3.2 km) to the west of Cottingham. Further west along Westfields Road lies Raywell.

Eppleworth forms part of the civil parish of Skidby.

In 1823 Baine's History, Directory and Gazetteer of the County of York gave Eppleworth's name as 'Epplewith'. At the time it was in the parish of Skidby and the Wapentake of Harthill. Recorded in the hamlet were a farmer and a yeoman.
