= Listed buildings in Rowley, East Riding of Yorkshire =

Rowley is a civil parish in the county of the East Riding of Yorkshire, England. It contains six listed buildings that are recorded in the National Heritage List for England. Of these, one is listed at Grade II*, the middle of the three grades, and the others are at Grade II, the lowest grade. The parish contains the villages of Rowley, Little Weighton and Risby, the hamlet of Riplingham, and the surrounding countryside. The listed buildings consist of a church, a rectory converted into a hotel and its ha-ha, two houses and a folly.

== Key ==
| Grade | Criteria |
|---|---|
| II* | Particularly important buildings of more than special interest |
| II | Buildings of national importance and special interest |

== Buildings ==
| Name and location | Photograph | Date | Notes | Grade |
|---|---|---|---|---|
| St Peter's Church; 53.78074°N 0.51965°W | | 12th century | The church has been altered and extended through the centuries, including a restoration in 1852. It is built in stone with some brick patching, the porch is in brick, and it has slate roofs. The church consists of a nave, a north and south aisles, a south porch, a chancel with a south chapel and a north vestry, and a west tower. The tower has three stages, a two-light pointed west window, lancet windows on the middle stage, two-light pointed bell openings, and an embattled parapet with corner finials. | II* |
| Rowley Manor; 53.78046°N 0.52141°W | | 1710 | A rectory that was later extended, and subsequently converted into a hotel. It is in red brick with stone dressings, a moulded timber eaves cornice, and hipped slate roofs. The main block has three storeys and five bays, with rusticated quoins. The middle bay projects, and contains a doorway with a fanlight, the windows on the lower two floors are sashes under flat gauged brick arches, and on the top floor are replacement windows. The main block is flanked by later wings. | II |
| 2 Skidby Road, Little Weighton; 53.79159°N 0.50154°W | | Early 18th century (probable) | The house, which was later extended, is in chalk and rubble, with brick on the extension, and a pantile roof. There are two storeys and three bays. On the front is a doorway and horizontally sliding sash windows. The ground floor openings have gauged brick arches, the left window has a segmental arch and the others are flat. | II |
| Ha-ha, Rowley Manor; 53.78011°N 0.52142°W | — | 18th century | The ha-ha running along the south of the garden of the house is in brick. | II |
| Folly in Fishpond Wood; 53.80480°N 0.46427°W | | Late 18th century | The folly is in red brick with stone dressings, and is in Gothic style. It is an octagonal building with buttresses, and pointed openings on seven sides, the other side infilled to form a fireplace. There is no roof. | II |
| Riplingham House; 53.77463°N 0.54454°W | | Late 18th century | The house is in dark red brick, with a moulded eaves cornice, and a two-span slate roof with raised coped gables on shaped kneelers. The main block has three storeys and three bays. In the centre is a doorway with pilasters, flanked by canted bay windows. The other windows are sashes with wedge lintels. To the left is a two-storey single-bay range, gabled on the front, behind a ramped parapet. | II |
