= North Cave railway station =

Disused railway station in the East Riding of Yorkshire, England

North Cave

General information
- Location: North Cave, East Riding of Yorkshire; England
- Coordinates: 53.7755°N 0.6418°W
- Grid reference: SE896319
- Platforms: 2

Other information
- Status: Disused

History
- Original company: Hull, Barnsley and West Riding Junction Railway
- Pre-grouping: Hull and Barnsley Railway
- Post-grouping: London and North Eastern Railway

Key dates
- 1885: opened
- 1955: closed for passengers
- 1959: closed for freight
Location

North Cave railway station was a station on the Hull and Barnsley Railway, and served the village of North Cave in the East Riding of Yorkshire, England.

The station opened on 22 July 1885, closed to passengers on 1 August 1955 and closed completely on 6 April 1959.

Preceding station	Disused railways	Following station
Wallingfen	Hull and Barnsley Railway	South Cave
