= Listed buildings in Skidby =

Skidby is a civil parish in the county of the East Riding of Yorkshire, England. It contains eight listed buildings that are recorded in the National Heritage List for England. Of these, two are listed at Grade II*, the middle of the three grades, and the others are at Grade II, the lowest grade. The parish contains the village of Skidby, the hamlet of Raywell and the surrounding countryside. The listed buildings consist of a church, houses and associated structures, and a windmill with associated buildings.

== Key ==
Grade	Criteria
II*	Particularly important buildings of more than special interest
II	Buildings of national importance and special interest

== Buildings ==
Name and location	Photograph	Date	Notes	Grade
St Michael's Church; 53.78939°N 0.46067°W		12th century	The church has been altered and extended through the centuries. It is built in stone and brick with slate roofs, and consists of a nave, a north aisle, a chancel and a west tower. The tower has two stages, a stone base and brick above, a band, round-headed bell openings, and a low parapet with corner pinnacles.	II*
44 Main Street; 53.78967°N 0.45721°W		Mid to late 18th century	The house is in brown brick, with a deep moulded brick eaves cornice, and a pantile roof with tumbled-in brick to the raised gables on shaped kneelers. There are two storeys and three bays. The central doorway has a fanlight, the windows are sashes, and all the openings are under flat gauged brick arches.	II
Raywell House; 53.76386°N 0.49737°W		1803	The house is in white brick with stone dressings and hipped slate roofs. It consists of a main block with three storeys and five bays, and flanking two-storey sing-bay wings. The main block has floor and sill bands, and in the centre is a projecting porch with unfluted Doric columns, and sash windows with pilastered surrounds, and the doorway has a fanlight with radial glazing. The windows are sashes under cambered wedge lintels. The wings have paired eaves brackets, and contain sash windows in round-headed recesses with an impost band.	II
Braffords Hall; 53.76413°N 0.50626°W	—	After 1812	The house is in white brick, with stone dressings, a sill band, an eaves cornice and a blocking course, and slate roofs. The main range has two storeys and three bays, and projecting wings of two storeys and one bay. In the centre is a porch with Tuscan columns, a frieze and a cornice. The doorway has a fanlight with radial glazing and a rusticated surround, and a keystone with a carved face. The windows are sashes, the window above the doorway in an architrave, with a fluted pulvinated frieze and a projecting cornice, those on the ground floor under slightly cambered lintels, and on the upper floor with wedge lintels. The wings have corner pilasters, parapets with a central balustered panel, and hipped roofs.	II
Skidby Windmill and mill buildings 53.78620°N 0.45258°W		1821	A working tower windmill, It is in tarred brick, with timber-framed cap sails, and a fantail painted white. There is a circular tapering tower with six storeys containing a doorway and windows, mostly pivoted. At the top is a circular ogee cap with a ball finial, and an eight-bladed fantail on a high fanstage. There are four double-shuttered patent sails and striking gear mounted on an iron cross. The attached mill buildings are in brick, with two storeys and pantile roofs. They contain doorways and casement windows, most under segmental heads.	II*
Stable block, Braffords Hall; 53.76412°N 0.50671°W	—	Early 19th century	The stable range is in white brick, with floor bands and stone slate roofs. There is a U-shaped plan, each range with two storeys and three bays. The main range contains three carriage doors, each under an elliptical gauged brick arch, above which is a central round-headed blank opening flanked by windows under segmental brick arches. On the roof is a cupola with six Tuscan columns, an entablature and a lead dome. The wings contain doorways and windows, and have hipped roofs.	II
Outbuilding and stables, Skidby Windmill; 53.78629°N 0.45295°W	—	Early 19th century	The buildings to the north of the windmill are in brick, and form an L-shaped plan. The west range has a slate roof, and contains doorways and a window. The east range has a pantile roof, it contains four stable doors, and beyond is a higher cart shed range.	II
West Cottage Grange Farm and screen walls 53.77618°N 0.46005°W		Early 19th century	The house is rendered and colourwashed, on a plinth, with rusticated quoins, a sill band, a moulded eaves cornice, and a hipped pantile roof. There are two storeys and three bays. The central doorway has fluted half-columns, a fanlight with radial glazing, and a canopy, and the windows are sashes in eared architraves. The flanking screen walls end in pilasters surmounted by urns, and the left wall contains a garden door.	II
