= The Tiger Inn =

Pub in the East Riding of Yorkshire, England

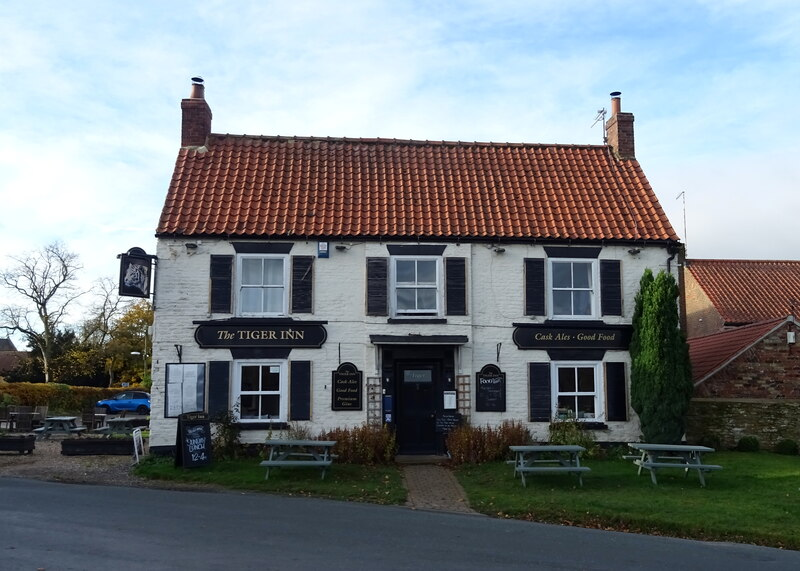
The pub, in 2021

The Tiger Inn is a historic pub in North Newbald, a village in the East Riding of Yorkshire, in England.

The pub was built in the late 18th century, on a site overlooking the village green. It was grade II listed in 1987. As of 2019, it had two rooms, the main bar and a snug, and served food and real ales. It had a small library, and a collection of walking sticks.

The public house is built of colourwashed stone with a pantile roof. There are two storeys and three bays, the middle bay projecting slightly. The central doorway has pilasters and a canopy on fluted brackets. The windows are sashes under wedge lintels with louvred shutters.

== See also ==
- Listed buildings in Newbald
