= Listed buildings in Newbald =

Newbald is a civil parish in the county of the East Riding of Yorkshire, England. It contains ten listed buildings that are recorded in the National Heritage List for England. Of these, one is listed at Grade I, the highest of the three grades, and the others are at Grade II, the lowest grade. The parish contains the village of North Newbald, the hamlet of South Newbald, and the surrounding countryside. Most of the listed buildings are houses, and the others consist of a church, a public house and a telephone kiosk.

== Key ==
Grade	Criteria
I	Buildings of exceptional interest, sometimes considered to be internationally important
II	Buildings of national importance and special interest

== Buildings ==
Name and location	Photograph	Date	Notes	Grade
St Nicholas' Church; 53.81750°N 0.61641°W		c. 1140	The church has been altered and extended through the centuries, including restorations during the 19th century. It is built in stone with a slate roof, and has a cruciform plan, consisting of a nave, north and south transepts, a chancel with a north vestry, and a tower at the crossing with a northwest stair turret. The tower has three stages, twin chamfered lancet bell openings, clock faces, a double-chamfered string course, and an embattled parapet with corner crocketed pinnacles. The remaining Norman features include four doorways, flat buttresses, and some of the windows. On the nave is a carved corbel table with grotesque faces and beasts.	I
Mires Farmhouse; 53.81827°N 0.61852°W	—	Early to mid-18th century	The house is in limestone, with brick dressings, a dentilled brick eaves cornice, and a pantile roof with tumbled-in brick to the raised gables. There are two storeys and five bays, the middle bay projecting slightly. The central doorway has a fanlight, the windows are sashes, and all the openings are under flat gauged brick arches.	II
15 Eastgate; 53.81888°N 0.61657°W	—	Late 18th century	The house is in limestone, with brick dressings, a dentilled brick eaves cornice, and a pantile roof with raised coped gables. There are two storeys and three bays. On the front is a doorway with a fanlight, and to the right is a carriage entrance. The windows are sashes, and all the openings are under flat gauged brick arches.	II
Brook Farmhouse; 53.81903°N 0.61356°W	—	Late 18th century	The house is in limestone, with brick dressings, a dentilled brick eaves cornice, and a pantile roof with raised coped gables. There are two storeys and three bays, and a two-storey single-bay wing on the left. On the front is a doorway with a fanlight, the windows are sashes, and all the openings are under wedge lintels.	II
Manor Cottage, Manor Farm and farm buildings 53.81153°N 0.61799°W		Late 18th century	The house and the cottage are in stone, the house is faced in brick, the cottage to the right is pebbledashed, and they have pantile roofs and two storeys. The house has three bays, a doorway with reeded pilasters, a semicircular fanlight and an open pediment. The cottage has two bays, and the windows in both parts are sashes, those on the ground floor with channelled painted wedge lintels. The farm buildings are mainly in stone, with brick dressings. They include a two-storey multi-purpose barn, a cart shed and stabling, and open-fronted sheds.	II
Pear Tree Cottage; 53.81936°N 0.61495°W	—	Late 18th century	The house is in colourwashed brick with a slate roof. There are two storeys, and three bays, and a further bay slightly recessed on the right. On the front is a gabled porch, and sash windows under flat gauged brick arches.	II
Sike House Farmhouse; 53.83379°N 0.62312°W	—	Late 18th century	The house is in brown brick with a floor band, a dentilled brick eaves cornice, and a pantile roof with raised coped gables on shaped kneelers. There are two storeys and three bays. The doorway has pilasters and a fanlight, the windows are sashes, and all the openings are under flat gauged brick arches.	II
The Tiger Public House; 53.81864°N 0.61539°W		Late 18th century	The public house is in colourwashed stone with a pantile roof. There are two storeys and three bays, the middle bay projecting slightly. The central doorway has pilasters and a canopy on fluted brackets. The windows are sashes under wedge lintels with louvred shutters.	II
Hall Garth; 53.81900°N 0.61612°W	—	1787	The house is in limestone, with brick dressings, and a pantile roof with tumbled-in brick to the raised gables. There are two storeys and three bays, the middle bay projecting slightly. The central doorway and the windows, which are sashes, have flat gauged brick arches and projecting keystones. On the keystone over the doorway is the date.	II
Telephone kiosk 53.81899°N 0.61493°W		1935	The telephone kiosk on The Green is of the K6 type designed by Giles Gilbert Scott. Constructed in cast iron with a square plan and a dome, it has three unperforated crowns in the top panels.	II
