= Little Weighton =

Village in the East Riding of Yorkshire, England

Coordinates: 53.791010°N 0.505287°W

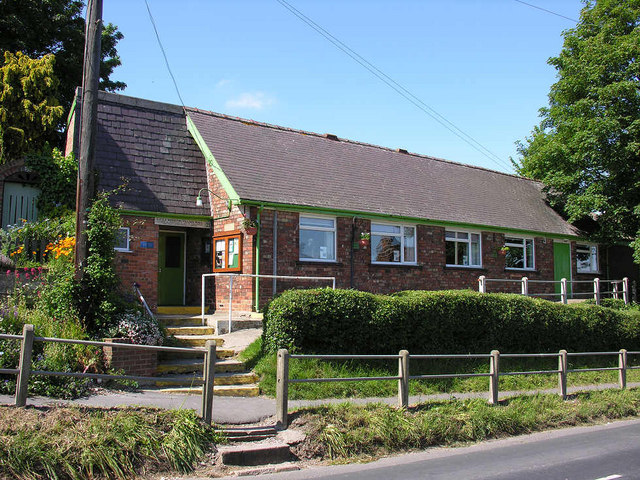
- Village Hall, Little Weighton

- Location within the East Riding of Yorkshire
- OS grid reference: SE985337
  - London: 155 mi (249 km) S
- Civil parish: Rowley
- Unitary authority: East Riding of Yorkshire
- Ceremonial county: East Riding of Yorkshire
- Region: Yorkshire and the Humber
- Country: England
- Sovereign state: United Kingdom
- Post town: COTTINGHAM
- Postcode district: HU20
- Dialling code: 01482
- Police: Humberside
- Fire: Humberside
- Ambulance: Yorkshire
- UK Parliament: Goole and Pocklington

Little Weighton is a village in the East Riding of Yorkshire, England. It is approximately 5 miles (8 km) south-west of Beverley and 4.1 miles (6.6 km) west of Cottingham and forms part of the civil parish of Rowley.

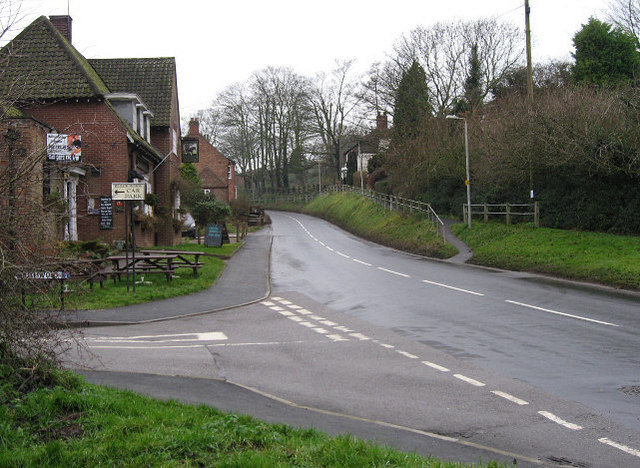
Old Village Road, Little Weighton, on a rather bleak day

== History ==
=== Domesday Book ===
Little Weighton was a settlement in Domesday Book, in the hundred of Welton and the county of Yorkshire. It had a recorded population of 8.5 households in 1086, putting it in the smallest 40% of settlements recorded in Domesday (Nb: 8.5 households is an estimate, since multiple places are mentioned in the same entry). It is recorded:

16 villagers and 1 priest, 3 ploughlands, 2 lord's plough teams, 4 men's plough teams, 2 mills (value 16 shillings), 1 church. Annual value to lord was 2 pounds 10 shillings in 1086 and 2 pounds in 1066. The tenant-in-chief in 1086 was Hugh son of Baldric. The Lord in 1066 was Gamal, son of Osbert.

=== Later history ===
Little Weighton is supposed by some to have been the site of the famous battle of Brunanburh.

On 14 April 1702 Jeremiah Northend was buried, aged 78, in Rowley. Aged 14, he had emigrated to Massachusetts with his Uncle Robert and cousin Ezekiel, with the dissenting community led by Rev. Ezekiel Rogers, but returned to live in Little Weighton after nine years or so.

In 1823 Little Weighton was in the civil parish of Rowley and the Wapentake of Harthill. Occupations at the time included six farmers and yeomen, a shoemaker, a blacksmith, a tailor, a shopkeeper and the landlord of The Black Horse public house. A carrier operated between the village and Beverley and Hull once a week.

== 21st century ==
The village contains a small shop (which acts as a post office), a Church of England primary school, a church, a retirement home, village hall, playing fields, a garage and the former Black Horse public house, which permanently closed on 1 July 2023.

The village was served by the Little Weighton railway station on the Hull and Barnsley Railway between 1885 and 1955.

== Notable residents ==
Notable residents include former David Bowie bassist Trevor Bolder and former Hull City players Stan McEwan and Sam Ricketts.

== See also ==
- Listed buildings in Rowley, East Riding of Yorkshire
