= South Cave =

Village and civil parish in the East Riding of Yorkshire, England

Coordinates: 53.769011°N 0.598045°W

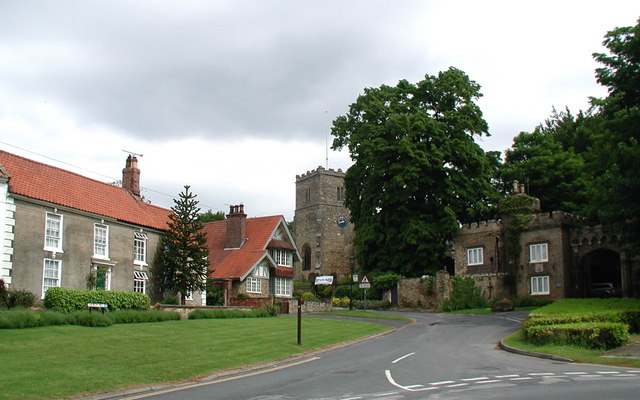
- Church Hill, South Cave

- Location within the East Riding of Yorkshire
- Population: 4,823 (2011 census)
- OS grid reference: SE925312
  - London: 155 mi (249 km) S
- Civil parish: South Cave
- Unitary authority: East Riding of Yorkshire
- Ceremonial county: East Riding of Yorkshire
- Region: Yorkshire and the Humber
- Country: England
- Sovereign state: United Kingdom
- Post town: BROUGH
- Postcode district: HU15
- Dialling code: 01430
- Police: Humberside
- Fire: Humberside
- Ambulance: Yorkshire
- UK Parliament: Goole and Pocklington

South Cave is a village and civil parish in the East Riding of Yorkshire, England. It is situated approximately 14 miles (23 km) to the west of Hull city centre on the A1034 road just to the north of the A63 road. North Cave is approximately 2 miles (3 km) to the north-west. South Cave formerly held a town charter that has lapsed and the parish council no longer styles itself as a town.

The civil parish is formed by the village of South Cave, the hamlet of Drewton and part of the hamlet of Riplingham. According to the 2011 UK Census, South Cave parish had a population of 4,823, an increase on the 2001 UK Census figure of 4,515.

South Cave lies within the constituency of Goole and Pocklington.

== History ==
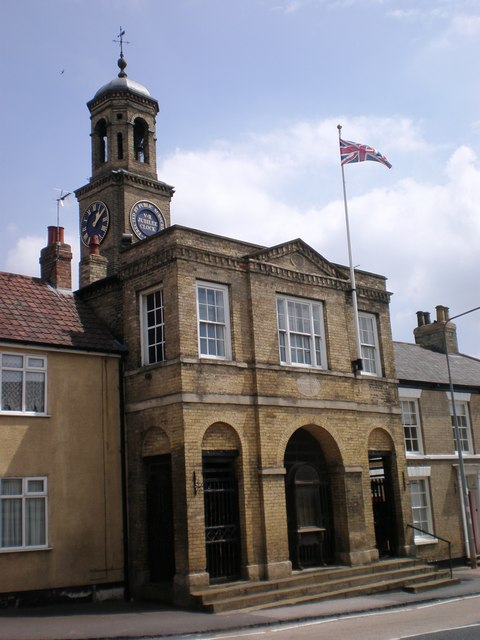
South Cave Town Hall

The name 'Cave' probably derives from "the fast-flowing one", being a stream from the Old English 'caf' meaning quick or swift.

The settlement is listed in the Domesday Book as "Cave", and in the Cave Hundred of the East Riding of Yorkshire. At the time of the survey there were 31 households, 30 villagers and a priest, 12 ploughlands, woodland and a church. In 1066 Gamal son of Osbert held the Lordship, this in 1086 transferred to Robert Malet, who was also Tenant-in-chief to William I. South Cave Town Hall dates from 1796.

In 1823 South Cave was a town and civil parish in the wapentake of Harthill, the Liberty of St Peter's, and in the division of Hunsley Beacon. Baines's History, Directory and Gazetteer of the County of York states that the South Cave's name probably derives from the "hollow" in which it sits. The parish, with South Cave, included the townships of Broomfleet, Faxfleet, and Osmandyke. A National School existed. A market was held every Monday in which a "great quantity" of corn was sold and sent to West Riding towns, including Leeds and Wakefield, by way of The Humber, with commodities such as coal, lime, and stone returning. Cave Castle, which then was "near this town", was the seat and principal residence of Henry Barnard. The house, described as "large and noble" and ornamented, had within a collection of pictures by the "best masters", including a portrait of George Washington, whose great grandfather lived at the house, possessed part of the estate, and emigrated to America in 1657 to settle in Westmoreland, Virginia.

In the town Market Place was a merchant, two attorneys, an educational academy (another two existed elsewhere), a National school, a blacksmith, two boot & shoe makers, a bricklayer, four butchers, four farmers, three shopkeepers, an agent for Cave Castle, two tailors, one of whom was a draper, a further draper who was a grocer, a wheelwright, a weaver, a horse dealer, an auctioneer, a gardener, and a baker, and one trader who was a grocer, druggist, linen & woolen draper, and hardware dealer. Some of these professions and trades were repeated elsewhere in the town, particularly at West End and West Gate. Further town occupations included a cooper, a clock & watch maker, a common brewer, a tinner & brazier, gunsmith, and a saddler & collar maker. There were the landlords of The Bay Horse, The Bear Inn, The Fox & Coney, The Three Tuns, and The Windmill public houses. The Fox & Coney also held the post and excise office of the town Postmaster, the office sending and receiving letters every day. Residents included a Leed church minister, two gentlemen and a gentlewoman. Coaches between Hull and Thorne passed through The Fox & Coney daily. Two carriers operated between the town and Hull, and Howden.

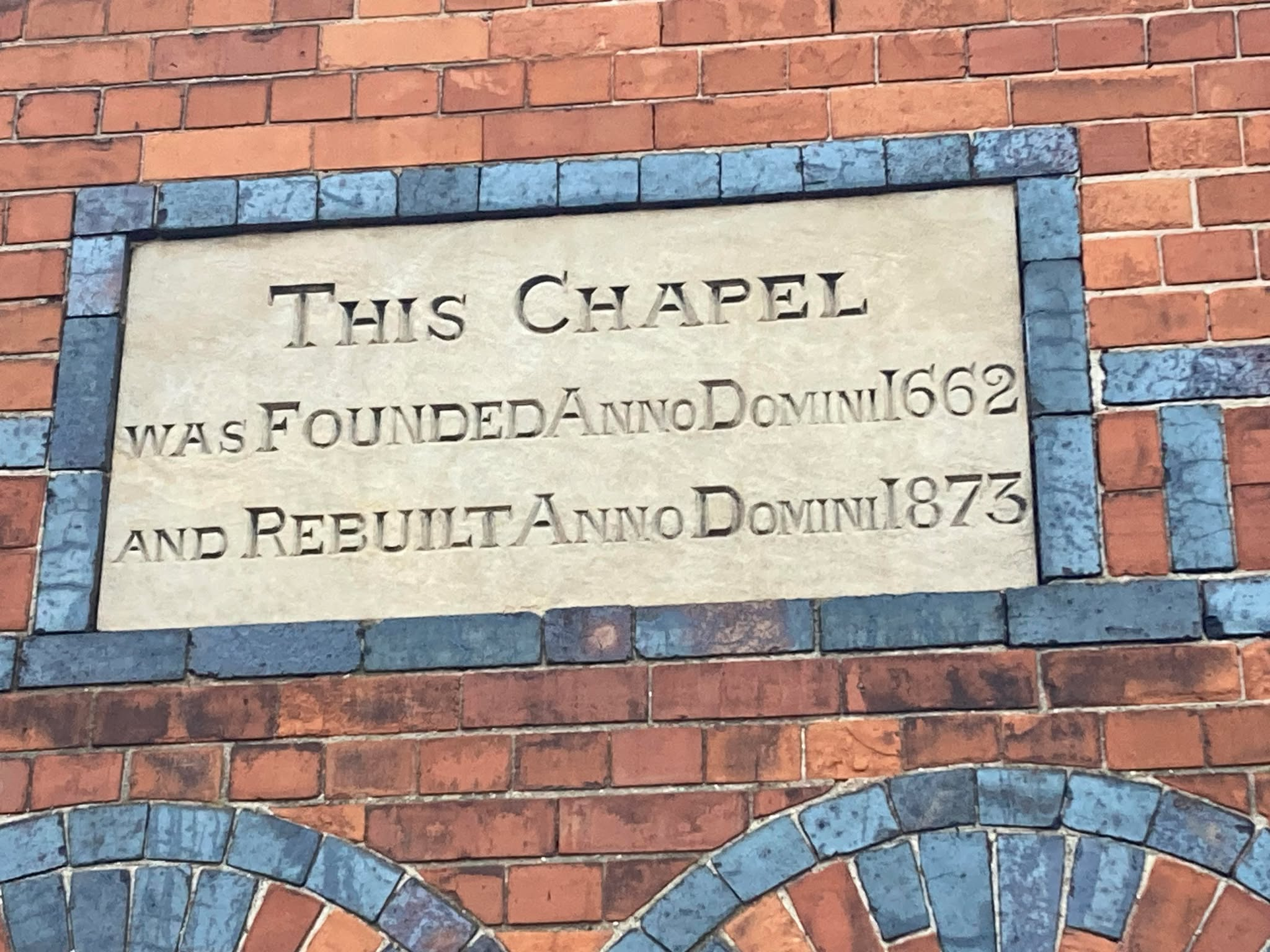
Congregational Chapel – foundation stone

The Primitive Methodist chapel was built in 1877 at a cost of about £600 and was used for worship until 2005, when the congegration joined with the Anglican All Saints Church. By 2013 the building had been converted into a dwelling. The Congregational Chapel on West End was originally Presbyterian; the foundation stone notes a date 1662 and a date of rebuilding in 1873.

South Cave was served by South Cave railway station on the Hull and Barnsley Railway between 1885 and 1955.

== Community ==
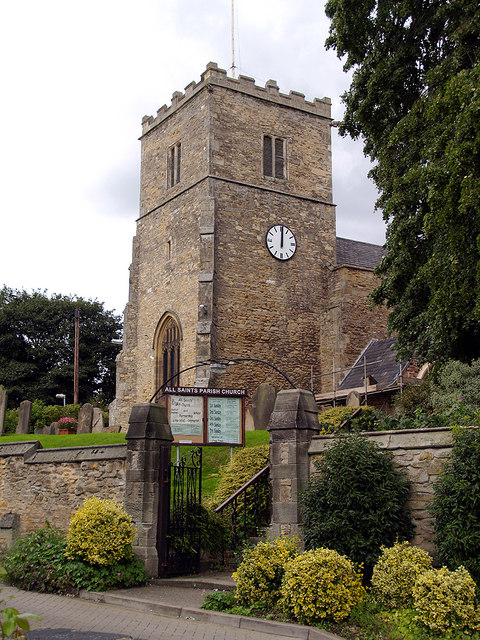
All Saints Church

The Yorkshire Wolds Way National Trail, a long distance footpath passes to the east end of the village.

The parish church of All Saints' was designated a Grade II* listed building in 1968 and is now recorded in the National Heritage List for England, maintained by Historic England. The Methodist Church joined with All Saints Church in September 2007.

Cave Castle, built in 1804, is a house in Gothic Revival style on Church Hill and is Grade II listed. Today it operates as a hotel with gym facilities and its grounds form a local golf club.

In 2003 the Haltemprice and Howden area was placed as the 10th most affluent in the country in a Barclays Private Clients survey.

== Sport ==
Since 2010, both the Sporting Club and the South Cave & Brantingham Cricket Club have been based at the Norman Elliott Pavilion at The Bully Field, which was finally completed after much public fundraising in 2012. The Pavilion was built at a cost of £730,000 and was named after Norman Elliott MBE of South Cave.

== See also ==
- Listed buildings in South Cave

== Gallery ==
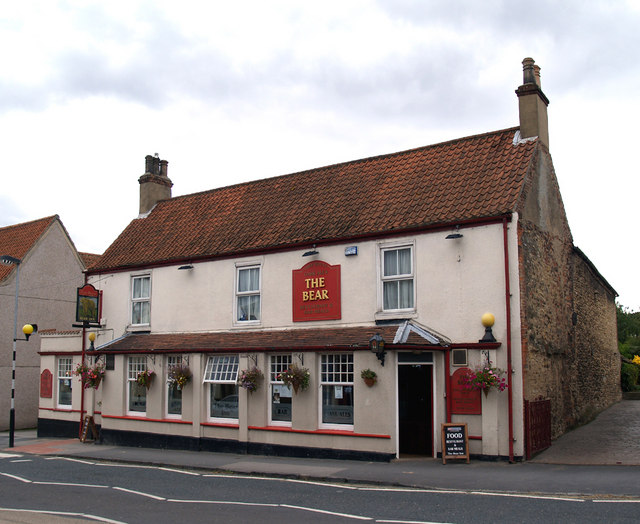
The Bear public house

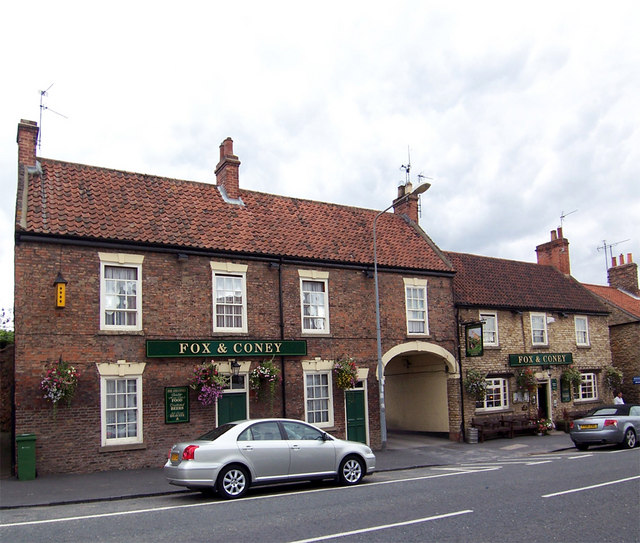
Fox and Coney public house

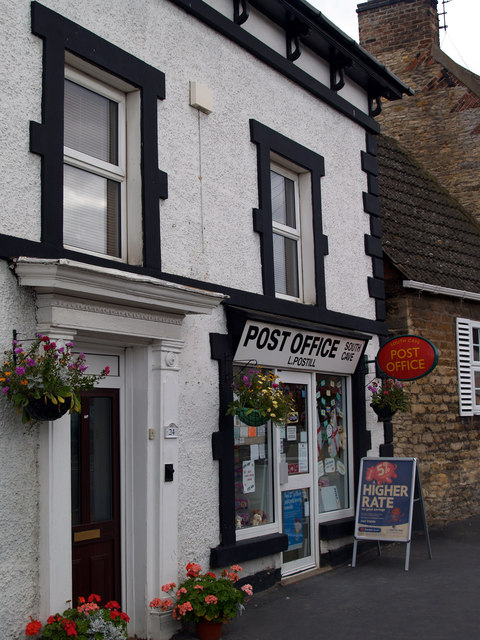
South Cave Post Office

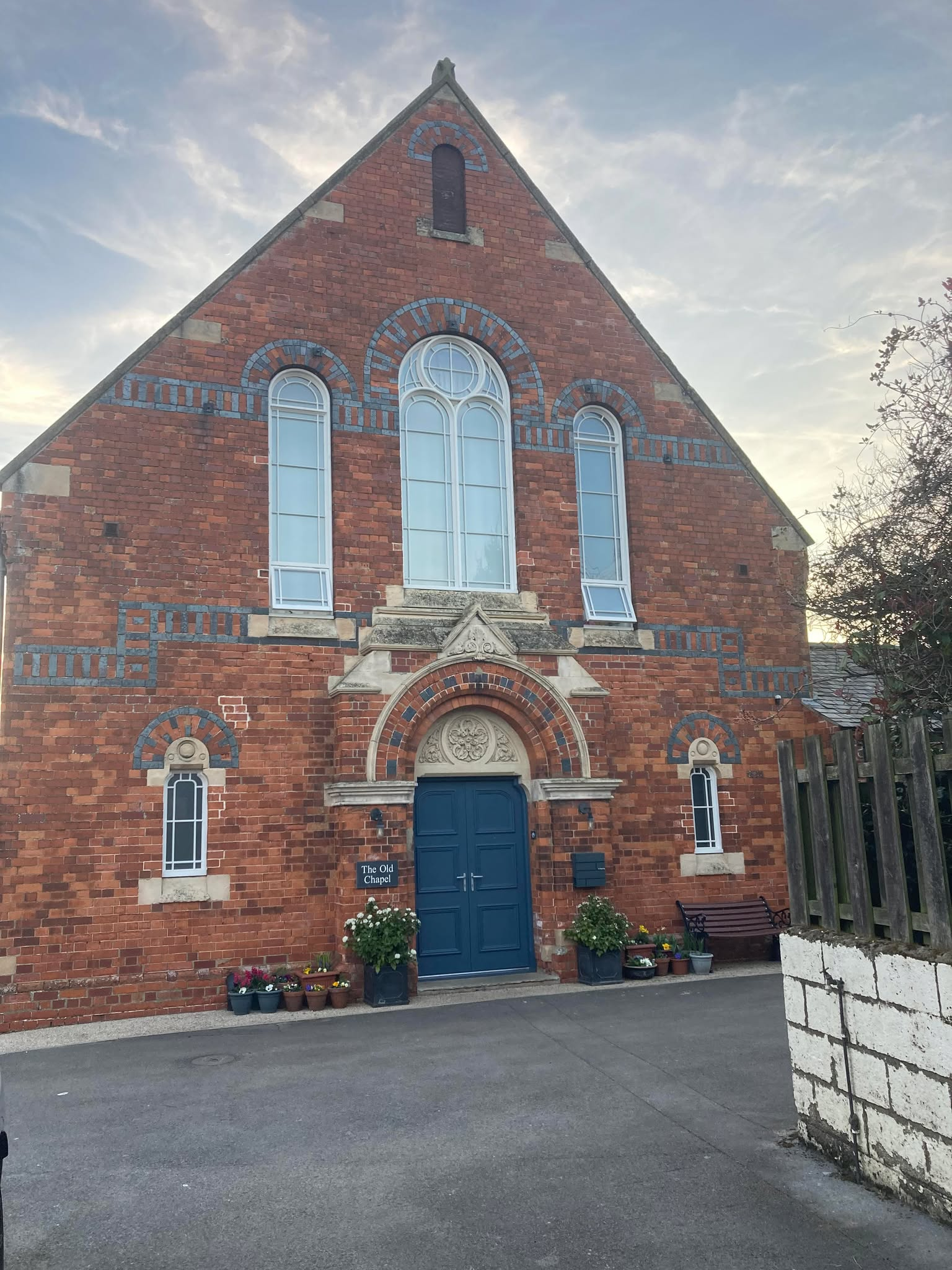
Former Congregational Chapel, West End

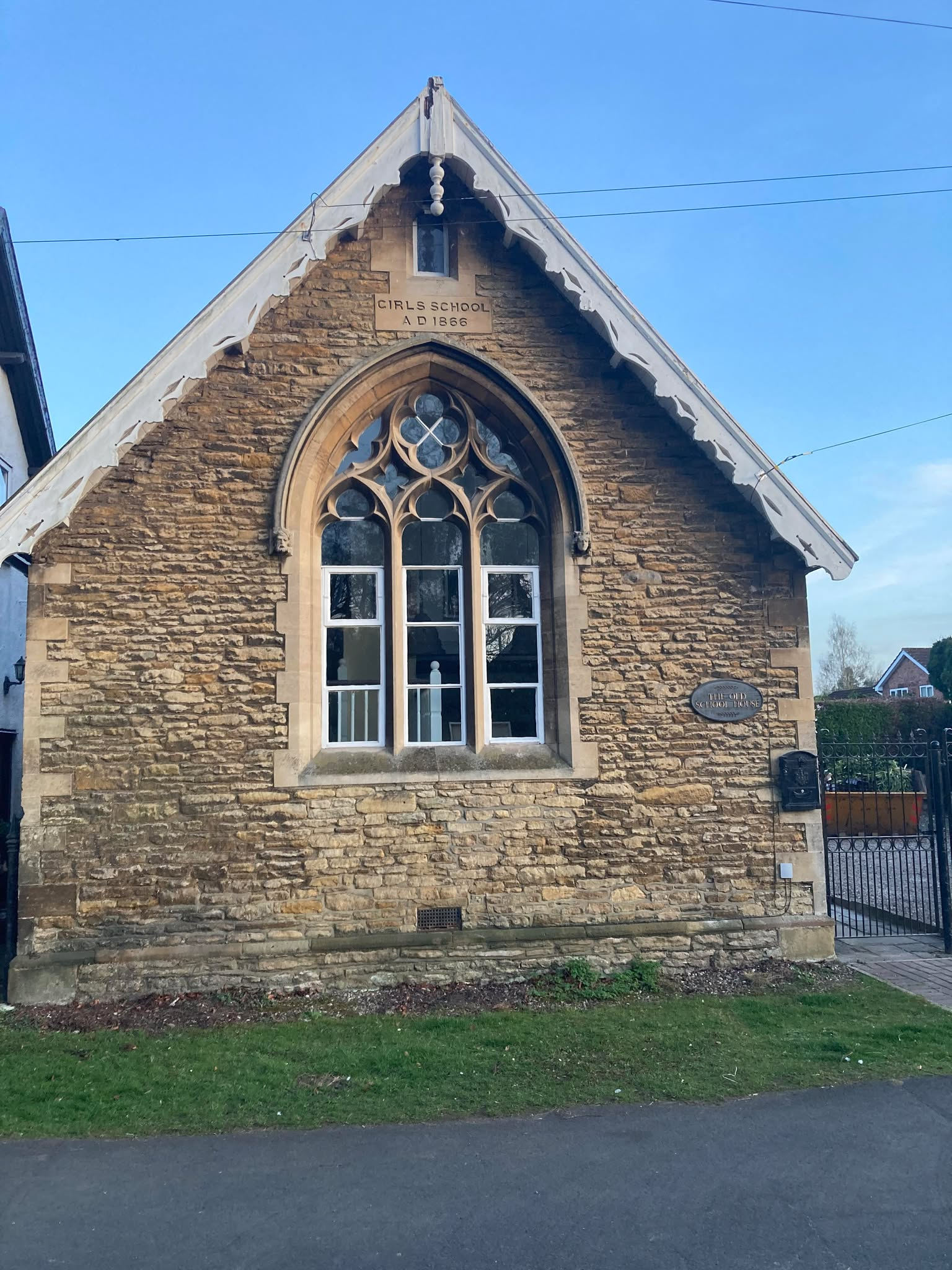
Former Girls School, Church Street

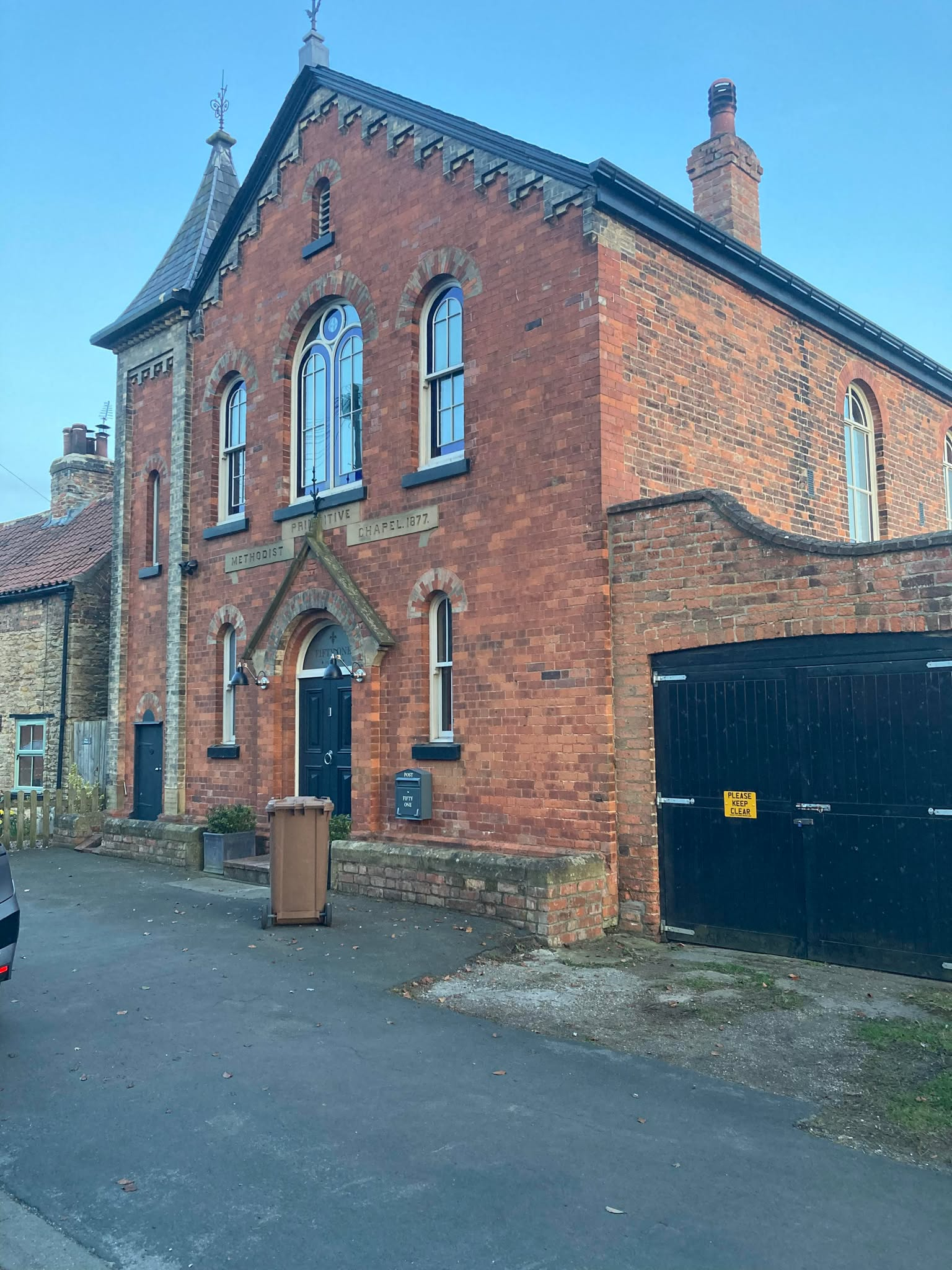
Former Primitive Methodist Chapel, Church Street
