= HU postcode area =

Postcode area within the United Kingdom

Hull
- Postcode area
- Coordinates: 53.770°N 0.351°W
- Country: United Kingdom
- Postcode area: HU
- Postcode area name: Hull
- Post towns: 8
- Postcode districts: 21
- Postcode sectors: 69
- Postcodes (live): 10,951
- Postcodes (total): 15,253
- Statistics as at May 2020

The HU postcode area, also known as the Hull postcode area, is a group of twenty postcode districts in England, within eight post towns. These cover the south of the East Riding of Yorkshire, including Hull, Beverley, Cottingham, Hessle, Hornsea, Withernsea, Brough and North Ferriby.

Mail for the HU postcode area is processed at Sheffield Mail Centre, along with mail for the DN, LN, and S postcode areas.

== Coverage ==
The approximate coverage of the postcode districts:

Postcode district	Post town	Coverage	Local authority area(s)
HU1	HULL	Hull, Centre, Old Town, Albert Dock	Kingston upon Hull
HU2	HULL	Hull, North of Centre, Wincolmlee	Kingston upon Hull
HU3	HULL	Hull, Spring Bank, West of Centre, Saint Andrew's Quay, Hull Royal Infirmary	Kingston upon Hull
HU4	HULL	Hull, Anlaby Common, Anlaby Park, Gipsyville	Kingston upon Hull
HU5	HULL	Hull, The Avenues	Kingston upon Hull
HU6	HULL	Hull, Dunswell, Orchard Park, Greenwood	Kingston upon Hull
HU7	HULL	Hull, Bransholme, Kingswood, Sutton-on-Hull, Wawne	Kingston upon Hull
HU8	HULL	Hull, Garden Village, Longhill, Sutton-on-Hull, Sutton Ings	Kingston upon Hull
HU9	HULL	Hull, Drypool, Victoria Dock, Marfleet, Preston Road, Greatfield, Bilton Grange	Kingston upon Hull
HU10	HULL	Anlaby, Kirk Ella, West Ella, Willerby	East Riding of Yorkshire
HU11	HULL	Bilton	East Riding of Yorkshire
HU12	HULL	Hedon, Patrington, Preston	East Riding of Yorkshire
HU13	HESSLE	Hull, Hessle	East Riding of Yorkshire
HU14	NORTH FERRIBY	North Ferriby, Melton, Swanland	East Riding of Yorkshire
HU15	BROUGH	Elloughton-cum-Brough, South Cave, Welton	East Riding of Yorkshire
HU16	COTTINGHAM	Hull, Cottingham, Eppleworth, Raywell, Skidby	East Riding of Yorkshire
HU17	BEVERLEY	Beverley, Bishop Burton, Walkington	East Riding of Yorkshire
HU18	HORNSEA	Hornsea, Mappleton, Rolston	East Riding of Yorkshire
HU19	WITHERNSEA	Withernsea, Hollym, Holmpton, Out Newton, Rimswell, Waxholme	East Riding of Yorkshire
HU20	COTTINGHAM	High Hunsley, Little Weighton, Low Hunsley, Riplingham	East Riding of Yorkshire

== Map ==
HU postcode area map, showing postcode districts in red and post towns in grey text, with links to nearby DN and YO postcode areas.

== See also ==
- Postcode Address File
- List of postcode areas in the United Kingdom
