= Coastal erosion in Yorkshire =

Erosion of the Yorkshire coastline, England

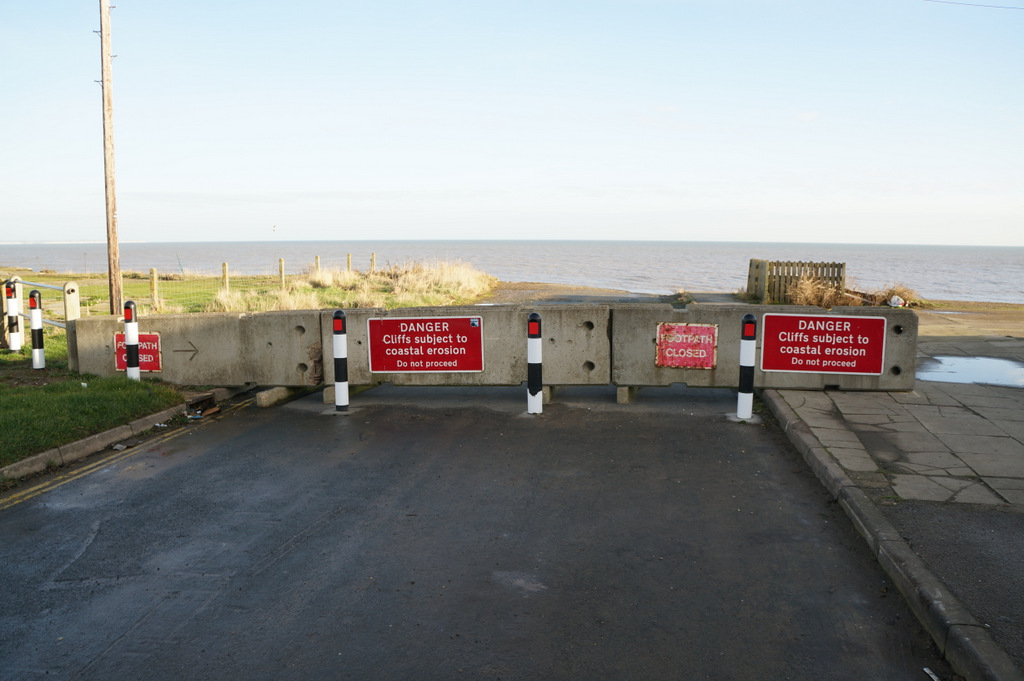
- Mill Lane at Cobble Gap - the road drops off over a cliff behind the barriers
- Location: East Riding of Yorkshire coast; North Yorkshire coast; Humber Estuary; 54.149°N 0.088°W
- Property damage: Loss of dwellings and roads

Coastal erosion in Yorkshire has been a process that has been documented since Roman times. Rates of erosion on the Holderness coast are known to be the worst within Europe, with the East Riding (and Norfolk) coastlines having the greatest number of at risk properties in England. Almost 30 settlements on the Holderness coastline have been lost to the sea, with more being subjected to flooding and loss exacerbated by a projected rise in the sea level caused by climate change. Due to the limited protection from effects of rising seas in the Humber Estuary, the region has the greatest value of assets at risk from flooding than anywhere else in England.

== Background ==
The coastline of Holderness consists of unprotected boulder clay cliffs which have been subjected to heavy erosion from the sea. Detailed analysis shows that much of the material lost from Holderness is swept down the coast to be deposited on Spurn Head. It is estimated that since Roman times, at least 30 settlements have been washed away by the action of the sea, with the boulder clay of the Holderness Coast being particularly susceptible to erosion. Coastal erosion on the Yorkshire coast has long been acknowledged; the town of Ravenser Odd, located south and east of the present Spurn Head, was washed away by several high tides and sea swells in the 14th century, the lighthouse at Withernsea, built in 1892, was located some 0.48 kilometres (0.3 mi) inland due to the land at the coast being sand dunes and constantly eroded, and a book published in 1912, The Lost Towns of the Yorkshire Coast, estimated that the coast had been eroding at a rate of 2.1 metres (7 ft) a year. However, detailed study of mapping has indicated that between 1852 and 1952, the rate was at a lesser loss of 1.2 metres (3 ft 11 in) on average each year. (Note: The Holderness coast suffered form the most erosion during this period in the areas that were studied; Norfolk's coastline retreated at a rate of 0.9 metres (2 ft 11 in) a year on average, and the coast of Suffolk lost land at a rate of 0.8 metres (2 ft 7 in). Another estimate stated that the average loss per year between 1852 and 1952 was 2.75 metres (9 ft 0 in).) The harder rocks of the North Yorkshire coastline (assessed between the mouth of the Tees and Ravenscar), retreated at a loss rate of 0.04 metres (1.6 in) during the same period.

Settlements along the North Yorkshire coast have been partially lost to the sea; the main road into the seaside village of Robin Hood's Bay was lost in 1780, and most of the village of Kettleness was lost in December 1829. Throughout the early part of the 20th century, houses were still being lost to the sea at Robin Hood's Bay; one story from 1946 tells of a woman sitting down to tea in her front room (facing westwards towards the landward side), and parts of the back of her house sliding 65 feet (20 m) into the sea. Further losses prompted the county council to build a seawall which is 500-foot (150 m) long, and 40-foot (12 m) high, costing £578,000 (equivalent to £4,489,000 in 2025). However, the loss at Kettleness was in part owing to alum quarrying on the shore below the clifftop village. Whitby has historically suffered from coastal erosion, most notably on the cliff edge by St Mary's Church, which has meant that some of the graves in the churchyard have been lost to the sea.

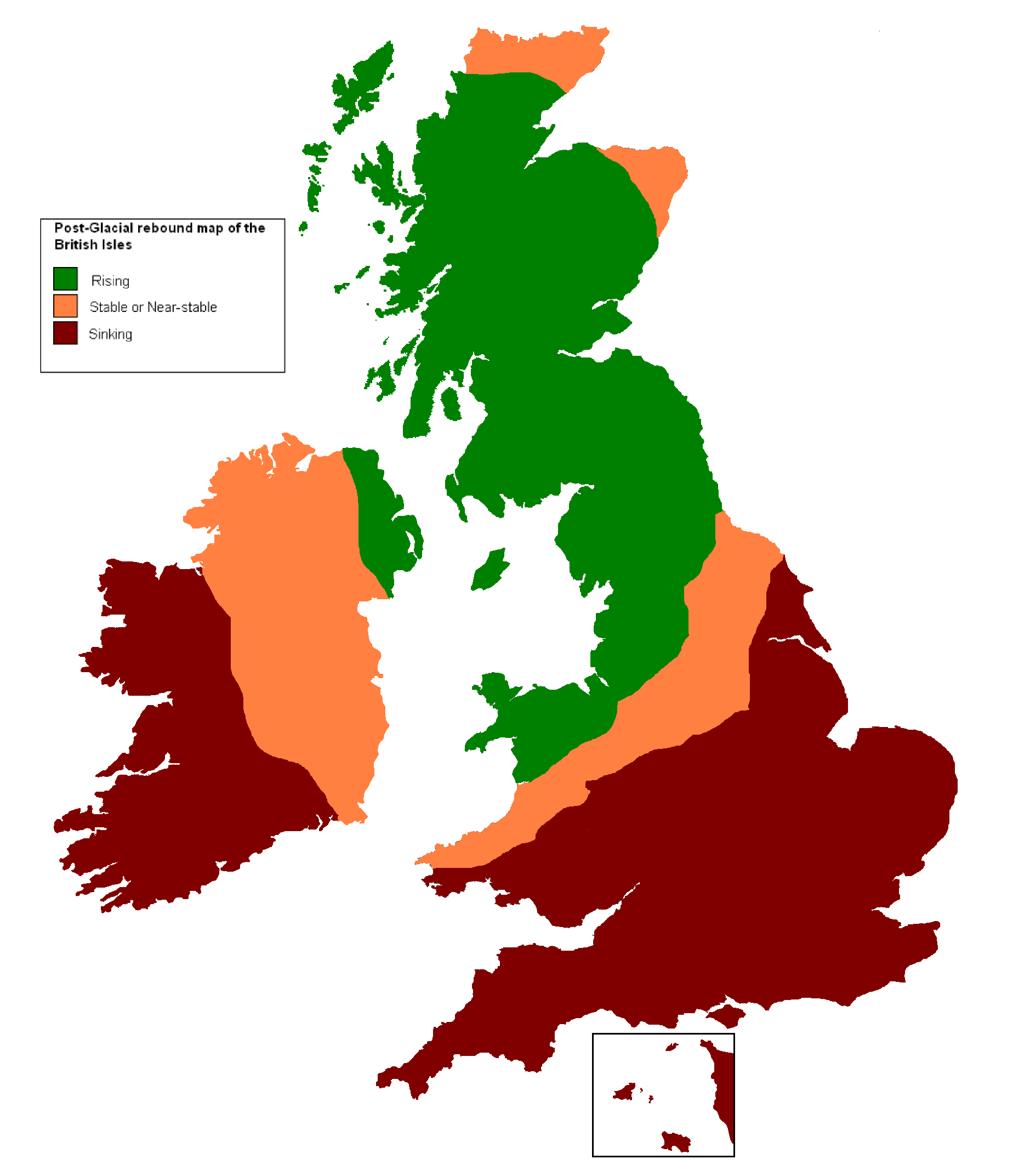
Post-glacial rebound in British Isles

A 2002 study suggested that the sea-level rise at the Yorkshire coast could be anywhere between 15 centimetres (5.9 in) and 75 centimetres (30 in) by 2080. However, a process known as isostatic adjustment, means that when the ice sheets melt, the top half of the United Kingdom will raise up, and the southern tilt down. As a result, there will be fewer areas at risk in far north of North Yorkshire than in the East Riding of Yorkshire. The line of demarcation between the stable lands and those rising is said to run along the Tees Valley.

A year–on–year average of a 3-millimetre (0.12 in) rising sea level has been the norm with isostatic adjustment, but coupled with rising sea levels due to global warming, this year–on–year average is expected to be around the 8-millimetre (0.31 in) mark. In 2022, the chief executive of the Environment Agency, Sir James Bevan, suggested that for coastal communities, such as those living on the East Riding coast (Holderness), moving away would be the only option compared to inland locations at the risk of rainfall flooding, where some preventative measures can be taken. The policy for coastal erosion is to allow all natural processes to continue as they are, and only focus anti-flooding measures such as sea walls and beach defences, on existing towns such as Bridlington, Hornsea and Withernsea. The Holderness coast is said to be being eroded at a rate of 120 metres (390 ft) per century due to its glacial drift geology, whereas the North Yorkshire coast between Whitby and Redcar is estimated to be retreating at a rate of 9 metres (30 ft) per century.

== Areas affected ==
Rising sea levels will exacerbate the coastal erosion problems by 2100, with some estimates stating that the rate of coastal erosion will increase by between three and seven times the early 21st century rate of erosion. Mostly, the rising sea levels will affect coastal communities, but also any low-lying areas near to major rivers and estuaries. The East Riding of Yorkshire will suffer greatly, and coastal erosion rates will increase due to the sea level rising. The city of Hull is a basin that can be affected by groundwater, rainwater and the tides: in 2018, it was estimated that 90% of Hull is below the high tide line. Hull is second only to London in British cities at risk of flooding, and only 2% of land in Hull is deemed to not be at risk of flooding. As the Humber Estuary has little or no protection from the sea (unlike London which has the Thames Barrier), the Yorkshire and Humber region have the greatest number of assets in England at risk of being flooded or overwhelmed by the sea. Another threat, known as "Coastal Squeeze", would mean the loss of many intertidal mudflats which are important to wildlife. Conservative modelling and estimates show that up to 7% of the intertidal mudflat areas of the Humber Estuary could be lost by 2050.

Around 195 homes along the East Yorkshire coast are expected to be at risk of being lost to the sea by 2105, with 18 of those being at threat by 2025. The shore and cliffs along the Holderness coast, specifically between Bridlington and Withernsea, are known to be on the fastest eroding coastline in Europe. Alongside the Norfolk Coast, the East Riding of Yorkshire has the greatest number of homes at risk due to coastal erosion in England. However, without rising sea levels and the effects of climate change, the coastline of Yorkshire, especially the Holderness Coast, would be affected by the natural processes of the tides, winds and waves which will erode and redistribute the sediment elsewhere. One notable location which is expected to be lost to the sea is Skipsea; whilst other locations on the coast have been provided with sea defences, Skipsea has not, and the coast there eroded over 9 metres (30 ft) in 2019 alone due to storms.

The former RAF bombing range at Cowden has been problematic as the erosion keeps revealing unexploded ordnance, with people warned to stay away from items found on the beach. This area will remain off-limits due to the dangers, and the England Coast Path will be moved inland away from the coastline at this point. The Hollym water treatment works was upgraded in 1991, and at that time, it was 168 metres (551 ft) from the shoreline, by 2018, it was only 40 metres (130 ft) distant from the coast. It was moved further inland in 2020. The Environment Agency's National Coastal Erosion Risk Mapping (NCERM) dataset lists several hamlets and villages at risk from being flooded or collapsing into the sea in the East Riding of Yorkshire by 2100.

Not many areas in North Yorkshire will be affected apart from Runswick Bay, and the River Esk estuary extending inland at Whitby. One area being studied for possible erosion due to rising sea states, is Scalby in North Yorkshire. Despite being a rocky foreshore and cliffs, the rate of loss at Scalby is predicted to be as much as 22 metres (72 ft) in the 80 years between 2020 and 2100.

== Sea protection ==
Some of the towns and villages along the Yorkshire coast have been given protection from the North Sea, either in the form of groynes (typically pre-dating the 20th century), breakwaters, concrete sea walls or rock armour. The Holderness coast stretches for 85 kilometres (53 mi), of which 73 kilometres (45 mi) is not defended, with the remaining 12 kilometres (7.5 mi) a mix of public and privately funded defences. In 2020, 63,000 tonnes (69,000 tons) of rock armour was used to defend the A1033 and roads in the south of Withernsea. Additionally, some defences have been cobbled together from concrete structures left over from the Second World War, such as defences against an invasion force using tanks.

- Barmston (rock armour)
- Bridlington (sea wall)
- Coatham (sea wall)
- Easington (rock armour)
- Filey (sea wall)
- Hornsea (sea wall)
- Kilnsea (sea wall)
- Mappleton (rock armour)
- Robin Hood's Bay (sea wall and rock armour)
- Redcar (sea wall)
- Runswick Bay (rock armour and sea wall)
- Saltburn-by-the-Sea (sea wall)
- Sand-le-Mere (rock armour)
- Sandsend (sea wall)
- Scarborough (breakwaters and rock armour)
- Staithes (breakwater and rock armour)
- Teesmouth (South Gare breakwater, originally built in 1888 to provide safe passage in and out of the River Tees)
- Whitby (breakwaters, rock armour and sea wall)
- Withernsea (sea wall and rock armour)

Another possible threat to defences is from a reduced sea level. The possibility of melting sea ice in the North Atlantic may actually precipitate a cooling of the sea, and affect the thermohaline circulation system, particularly in the case of the United Kingdom, the Gulf Stream. This cooler water system could lead to lower sea levels, and whilst sea defences run the risk of being over-topped by rising seas, a lower sea level may work away at the foundations of sea defences and cause them to fail or collapse.

== Lost settlements ==
A list of villages and towns lost to coastal erosion on the Yorkshire coast

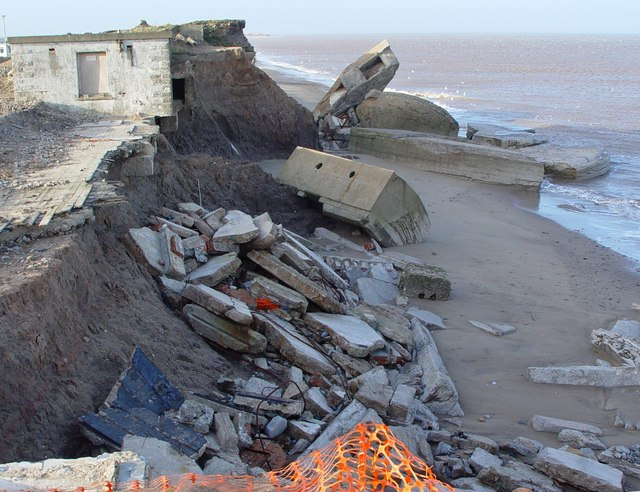
Coastal erosion, debris at Kilnsea

=== Holderness coast ===
- Auburn
- Cleton
- Colden Parva
- Dimlington
- Great Colden
- Hartburn
- Hornsea Beck
- Hornsea Burton
- Hoton
- Hyde
- Monkwell
- Monkwike
- Newsham
- Northorp
- Northorpe
- (Old) Aldborough
- (Old) Kilnsea
- (Old) Withernsea
- Out Newton
- Owthorne (Sisterkirke)
- Ravenser Odd
- Ravenspurn
- Ringborough
- Sand-le-Mere
- Southorpe
- Turmarr
- Waxholme
- Wilsthorpe
- Withow

=== Humber Estuary ===
- Burstall Priory
- Orwithfleet
- Sunthorp

=== North Yorkshire coast ===
- Kettleness (due to the alum industry)
- Robin Hood's Bay (partial)

== See also ==
- Lagoon Hull
