= Colden Parva =

Lost village in Yorkshire, England

Coordinates: 53.845°N 0.083°W

Colden Parva (Little Cowden)
- Ecclesiastical parish
- Location within the East Riding of Yorkshire
- Shire county: East Riding of Yorkshire
- Region: Yorkshire and the Humber
- Country: England
- Sovereign state: United Kingdom

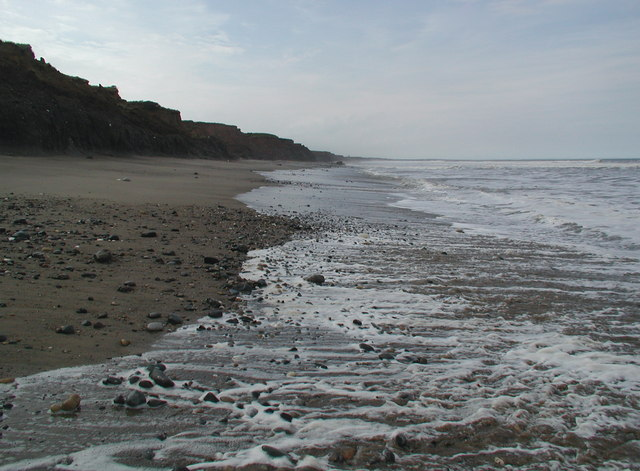
Lark Hill Beach

Colden Parva (also known as Little Cowden) is a former village and ecclesiastical parish of the East Riding of Yorkshire that was lost due to coastal erosion. The name persisted as part of the ecclesiastical parish covering nearby Aldbrough until into the 1970s. The parish was moved into that of Mappleton.

Its name means a hill where charcoal was burnt.

== History ==
The village of Little Cowden is recorded in the Domesday Book as being one of the smallest populated places in the Domesday record. The village of Little Cowden is listed as having seven houses in 1401, and was being occupied until 1517, when it was largely deserted. Church records show that 24 persons were evicted on the orders of St Mary's Abbey in York. Although some farmsteads continued in the area, most of the land in the parish and village had been lost to coastal erosion. The village is recorded as being "swept away by the sea" in 1690, but the church had been lost as early as 1627. The area became the property of the Ros family, then the le Despenser family, and finally the Wentworths.

Little Cowden/Colden Parva was listed as a village as it had a church dedicated to St John the Evangelist. The presence of the church and the link in religious terms to the ecclesiastical parish of Aldbrough, meant that the name of the village was still listed in the 1970s. The York Diocesan Yearbook for 1975 has an entry for "Aldbrough, St Bartholomew, with Colden Parva, St John the Evangelist (now in the sea)." As a few acres of the parish still existed on dry land, churchwardens were still being elected to the defunct church in the 1970s due to an act dating back to the 13th century.

Parts of the old parish were still extant in the 19th and 20th centuries, with the ecclesiastical parish covering an area of 728 acres (295 ha) in 1852, however, the loss rate of land due to coastal erosion was listed as being 3.8 yards (3.5 m) a year. What remained of Colden Parva in 1892 was two farms under its other name of Little Cowden.

Most of what was left of Colden Parva/Little Cowden had been washed away by 2009.

=== RAF Cowden ===
The Royal Air Force operated a 600-acre (240 ha) bombing range on the beach at RAF Cowden between 1959 and 1998. The range was closed due to coastal erosion, which is quite common on the East Riding coast. The erosion regularly reveals buried ordnance. In February 2021, Brimstone Site Investigation was awarded a £1.5 million contract to clear the ordnance from the site over a four-year period. The contract was the first of its kind awarded to a civilian company by the Defence Infrastructure Organisation (DIO).

The local HM Coastguard team at Hornsea frequently attend reports of ordnance in the first instance and send the details to the Humber Coastguard Operations Centre and EOD ops centre to decide on the appropriate means of disposal. All ordnance found on the coast should be reported to the Coastguard by dialling 999.

No. 5131(BD) Squadron used to deploy from RAF Wittering in Cambridgeshire to make the old bombs safe but were disbanded in 2019 with the British Army and Royal Navy EOD teams continuing to operate nationally.

== See also ==
- Ravenser Odd
- Ravenspurn
