= Leavening, North Yorkshire =

Village and civil parish in North Yorkshire, England

Coordinates: 54.057599°N 0.803032°W

Leavening
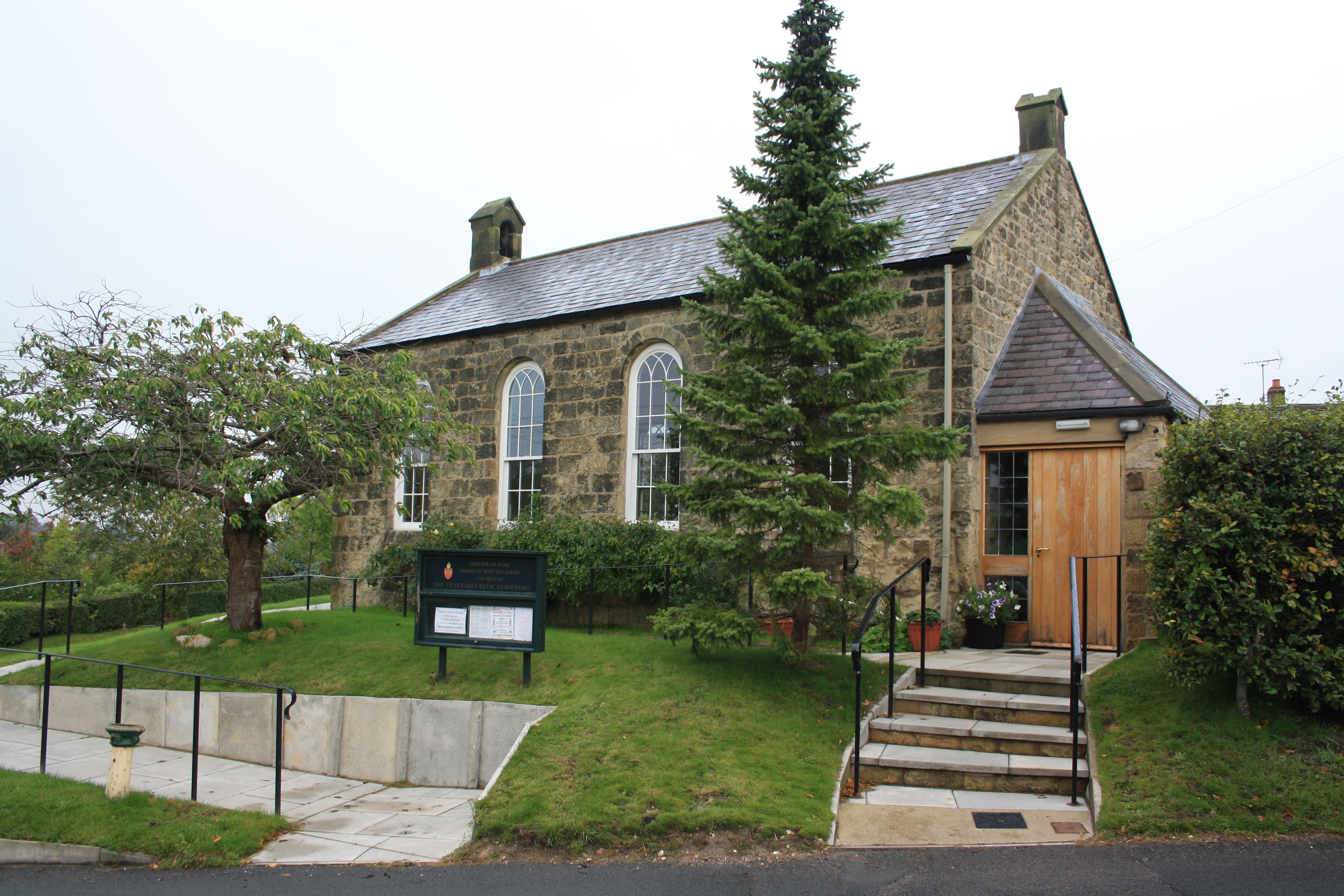
- The Church of The Venerable Bede, Leavening

- Location within North Yorkshire
- Population: 377 (2011 Census)
- OS grid reference: SE785630
  - London: 175 mi (282 km) S
- Civil parish: Leavening
- Unitary authority: North Yorkshire
- Ceremonial county: North Yorkshire
- Region: Yorkshire and the Humber
- Country: England
- Sovereign state: United Kingdom
- Post town: MALTON
- Postcode district: YO17
- Dialling code: 01653
- Police: North Yorkshire
- Fire: North Yorkshire
- Ambulance: Yorkshire
- UK Parliament: Thirsk and Malton

Leavening is a village and civil parish in North Yorkshire, England. The village is situated approximately 13 miles (20 km) north-east from the centre of the city of York. It was historically part of the East Riding of Yorkshire until 1974.

It was part of the Ryedale district between 1974 and 2023. It is now administered by North Yorkshire Council.

== History ==
The name Leavening possibly derives from the Old English Leofheahingas meaning 'Leofheah's people'.

Leavening is listed in the 1086 Domesday Book as in the Acklam Hundred of the East Riding of Yorkshire. At the time of the survey the settlement contained 10 households, 5 villagers, 5 smallholders, and 3 ploughlands.

In 1823 Leavening was in the civil parish of Acklam, the Wapentake of Buckrose and the Liberty of St Peter's, in the East Riding of Yorkshire. Population was 294, with occupations including thirteen farmers, four nurserymen, two carpenters, two grocers, three shoemakers, a blacksmith, a corn miller, a tailor, a butcher, a linen manufacturer, a schoolmaster, and the landlord of The Hare & Hounds public house. Wesleyan and Primitive Methodist chapels were established in Leavening in the 1820s and an Anglican chapel of ease was established in 1850 which doubled as a school (the parish church being in nearby Acklam). In Kelly's Directory (1893) it is stated that the school had an average attendance of 55 (with provision for 80) and that the population of Leavening in 1891 was 339.

== Amenities ==
Leavening has a public house: The Jolly Farmers Inn, a place of worship: the Church of the Venerable Bede, Leavening – a shared Anglican / Methodist church, and a primary school: Leavening County Primary School.

The Jolly Farmers Inn was the York CAMRA 'pub of the year' in 1997 and 'country pub of the season' for summer 2014. The pub was previously known as the Board Inn and before becoming a pub it was a blacksmith's workshop. It hosts the annual ‘World Championship Yorkshire Pudding Eating Competition’.

The church was built in 1850 originally as a church school and was licensed for use as a chapel of ease to the church in Acklam. It became an Anglican Parish Church in its own right in 1965 and was re-dedicated to the Venerable Bede. It is now used jointly by the Anglican and Methodist congregations of the village. Parish records dating as far back as 1716 are held in the Borthwick Institute, York.

Leavening County Primary School was established in 1906 with extensions added in 1963, 2003 and 2007. It caters for children aged 3–11, has a student capacity of 70 and a catchment area covering several local villages. In November 2023 the school was rated as 'Good' in an Ofsted report.

== Notable people ==
- William Jackson Bean, botanist and plantsman was born in Leavening on 26 May 1863.

== See also ==
- Listed buildings in Leavening, North Yorkshire
