= Acklam =

Acklam may refer to:

- Acklam, Middlesbrough, now a suburb
- Acklam, Ryedale
