= Ravenspurn =

Former town in the East Riding of Yorkshire, England

Coordinates: 53°36′10″N 0°10′00″E

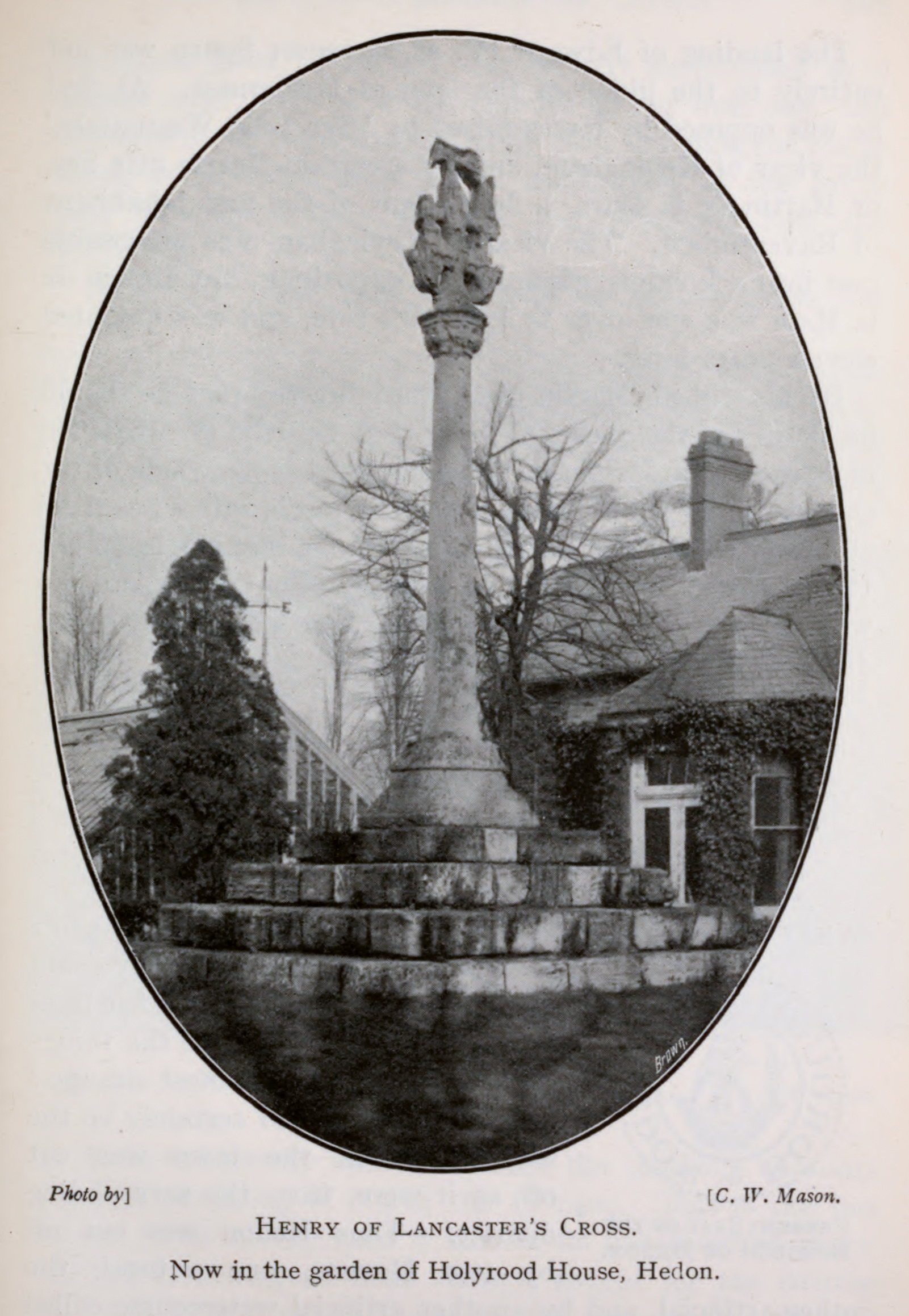
Ravenspurn Cross erected commemorating Henry IV's landing at Ravenspurn; the cross was later removed to Holyrood House in Hedon

Ravenspurn was a town in the East Riding of Yorkshire, England, which was lost due to coastal erosion, one of more than 30 along the Holderness Coast which have been lost to the North Sea since the 19th century. The town was located close to the end of a peninsula near Ravenser Odd, which had been flooded in the 14th century. The peninsula still survives and is known as Spurn Head. The North Sea lies to the east of the peninsula, the Humber estuary to the west.

The nearest major city was Kingston upon Hull.

The region of coastline is known as the Holderness Coast; geologically the land is formed of glacial tills (boulder clay), which are subject to coastal erosion. Now at sea, areas around the site are being drilled for natural gas.

Two English kings won the throne after landing at Ravenspurn: Henry IV in 1399, on his way to dethrone Richard II, and Edward IV, in 1471. Returning with an army from exile in the Netherlands, Edward was vainly resisted by the local lord, Sir Martin de la See, before defeating his Lancastrian opponents in the battles of Barnet and Tewkesbury. Ravenspurn, under the spelling 'Ravenspurgh', appears in William Shakespeare's plays Richard II and Henry IV, Part 1 in connection with Henry's landing, and in Henry VI, Part 3 in reference to Edward's.

== See also ==
- Colden Parva
- Ravenser Odd
- Ravenspurn gas fields
