= Church of the Venerable Bede, Leavening =

Church in Leavening, North Yorkshire, England

Coordinates: 54.0577°N 0.8031°W

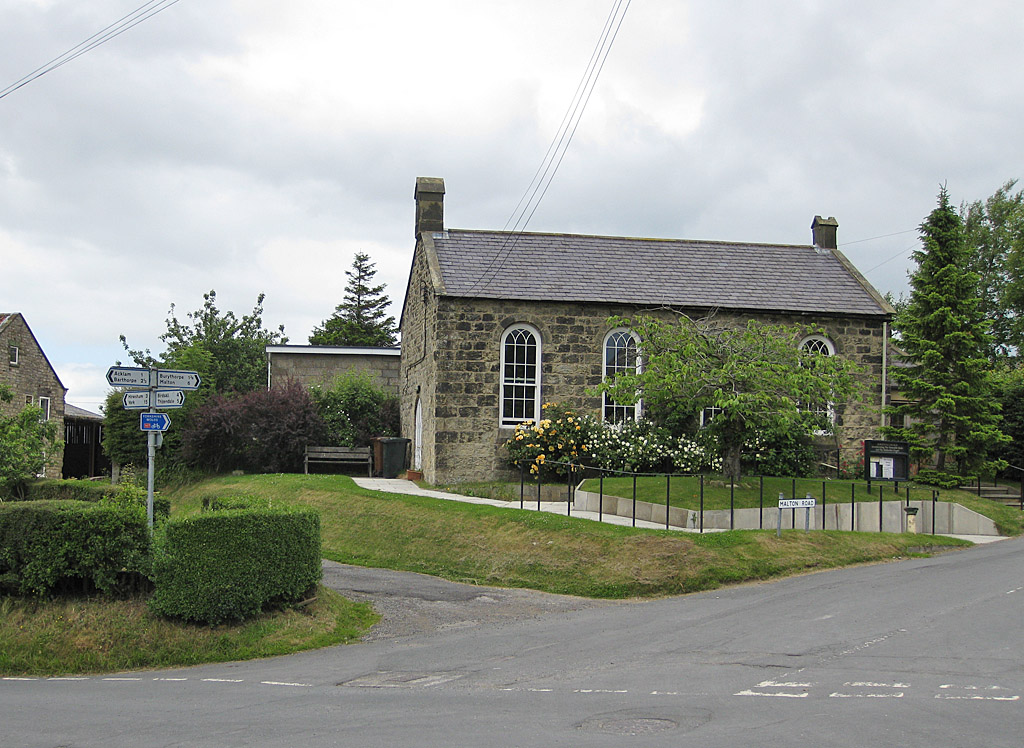
The church, in 2013

The Church of the Venerable Bede is an Anglican church in Leavening, North Yorkshire, a village in England.

The building was constructed in 1850, as the village school. In 1907, a larger school was opened, and the building became the village institute, also seeing use as an additional classroom. In 1965, it was converted into a church, dedicated to the Venerable Bede, a chapel of ease to St John the Baptist's Church, Acklam. In 2008, it was restored and reordered, the work including a move of the altar to the south-east end, an extension to the north-east providing an entrance hall and toilet, and conversion of the former sanctuary to a vestry and kitchen. Since then, the building has been shared with the local Methodist congregation.

Inside the church, the altar, candlesticks and cross were designed by George Pace. There is also the Leavening Embroidery, a 21st-century work depicting the seasons and local activities.
