= Spurn =

Tidal island in the East Riding of Yorkshire, England

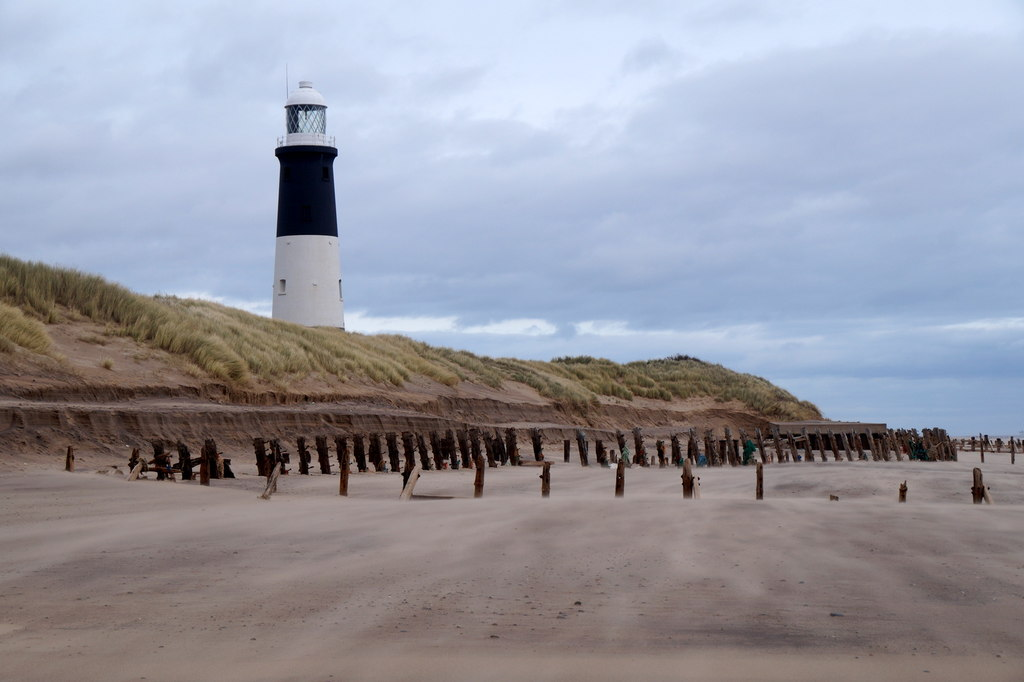
- Spurn in February 2017, showing the lighthouse and sand-dunes.

- Location within the East Riding of Yorkshire
- Population: 50 (approx)
- OS grid reference: TA399108
- Civil parish: Easington
- Unitary authority: East Riding of Yorkshire
- Ceremonial county: East Riding of Yorkshire
- Region: Yorkshire and the Humber
- Country: England
- Sovereign state: United Kingdom
- Post town: HULL
- Postcode district: HU12
- Dialling code: 01964
- Police: Humberside
- Fire: Humberside
- Ambulance: Yorkshire
- UK Parliament: Beverley and Holderness

Spurn is a narrow sand tidal island located off the tip of the coast of the East Riding of Yorkshire, England that reaches into the North Sea and forms the north bank of the mouth of the Humber Estuary. It was a spit with a semi-permanent connection to the mainland, but a storm in 2013 made the road down to the end of Spurn impassable to vehicles at high tide.

The island is over three miles (five kilometres) long, almost half the width of the estuary at that point, and as little as 50 yards (45 metres) wide in places. The southernmost tip is known as Spurn Head or Spurn Point and was, until early 2023, the home to an RNLI lifeboat station and two disused lighthouses. It forms part of the civil parish of Easington.

Spurn Head covers 280 acres (113 hectares) above high water and 450 acres (181 hectares) of foreshore. It has been owned since 1960 by the Yorkshire Wildlife Trust and is a designated national nature reserve, heritage coast and is part of the Humber Flats, Marshes and Coast Special Protection Area.

== History ==
Spurn Head was known to classical authors, such as Ptolemy as Ocelum Promontorium (Ancient Greek: Ὀκέλον ἄκρον). In the Middle Ages, Spurn Head was home to the port of Ravenspurn (a.k.a. Ravenspur or Ravensburgh), where Henry of Bolingbroke landed in 1399 on his return to dethrone Richard II. It was also where Sir Martin de la See led the local resistance against Edward IV's landing on 14 March 1471, as he was returning from his six months' exile in the Netherlands. An earlier village, closer to the point of Spurn Head, was Ravenser Odd. Along with many other villages on the Holderness coast, Ravenspurn and Ravenser Odd were lost to the encroachments of the sea, as Spurn Head, due to erosion and deposition of its sand, migrated westward.

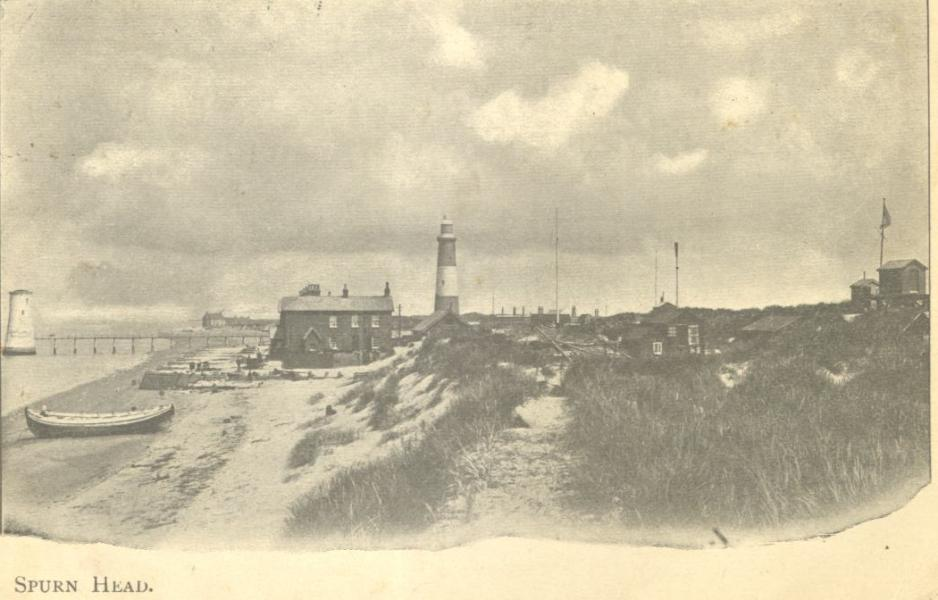
Settlement on Spurn Head c. 1904.

The lifeboat station at Spurn Head was built in 1810. Owing to the remote location, houses for the lifeboat crew and their families were added a few years later. By the 1870s a room in the high lighthouse was being used as a chapel for the small residential community on Spurn Head, serving 'the keepers, coast-guardsmen and fishermen who live at the Point'.

During the First World War two coastal artillery 9.2-inch (230 mm) batteries were added at either end of Spurn Head, with 4-and-4.7-inch (100 and 120 mm) quick-firing guns in between. The emplacements can be clearly seen, and the northern ones are particularly interesting as coastal erosion has partly toppled them onto the beach, revealing the size of the concrete foundations very well.

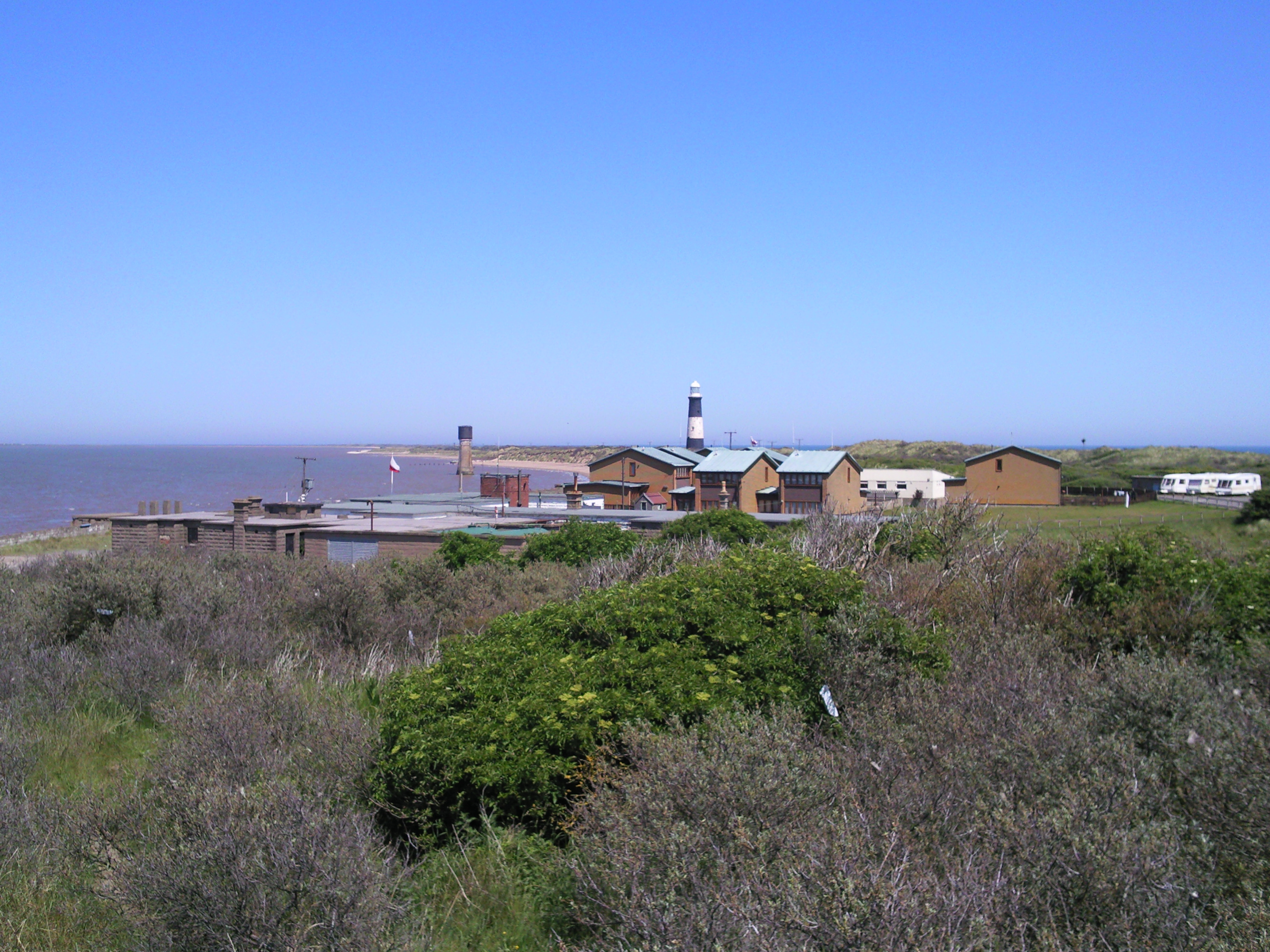
Settlement on Spurn Head in 2009

As well as a road, the peninsula also used to have a railway, parts of which can still be seen. Unusual 'sail bogies' were used as well as more conventional light railway equipment.

Following a tidal surge in December 2013 the roadway became unsafe, and access to Spurn Point is on foot only, with a warning not to attempt this when exceptionally high tides are due. Spurn has now become a tidal island, as the narrowest part of the sandbank connection to the mainland is flooded with each high tide.

Plans to build a new visitor centre for the reserve were unveiled in September 2014 by Yorkshire Wildlife Trust (YWT). Planning consent for the initial plans was refused by East Riding of Yorkshire Council in July 2016 but revised plans were approved in January 2017. These plans face local opposition because of the perceived feeling of commercialisation of the reserve by YWT, with plans to build extensive car park facilities, no longer free. The new visitor centre was officially opened by Simon King on 20 March 2018.

A February 2023 inspection of the RNLI launch jetty revealed structural issues, as a result the station was moved to Grimsby.

== Geography ==
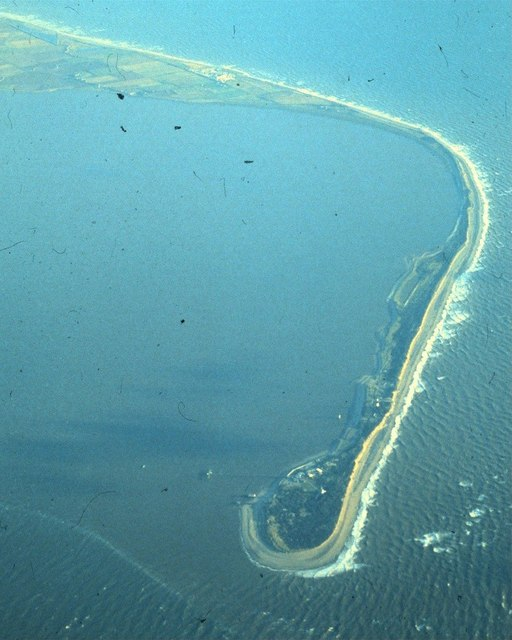
Spurn Head from the air in 1979

The spit is made up from sand, shingle and boulder clay eroded from the Holderness coastline washed down the coastline from Flamborough Head. Material is washed down the coast by longshore drift and accumulates to form the long, narrow embankment in the sheltered waters inside the mouth of the Humber Estuary. It is maintained by plants, especially marram grass (Ammophila arenaria). Waves carry material along the peninsula to the tip, continually extending it; as this action stretches the peninsula it also narrows it to the extent that the sea can cut across it in severe weather. When the sea cuts across it permanently, everything beyond the breach is swept away, only to eventually reform as a new spit pointing further south. This cycle of destruction and reconstruction occurs approximately every 250 years. More recently, Dr. John Pethick of Hull University put forward a different theory to explain the formation of Spurn Head. He suggests that the spit head has been a permanent feature since the end of the last ice age, having developed on an underwater glacial moraine. As the ice sheets melted, sea level gradually rose and longshore drift caused a spit to form between this and other islands along the moraine. Under normal circumstances, the sea washes over the neck of the spit taking sand from the seaward side and redepositing it on the landward side. Over time, the whole spit, length intact, slips back – with the spit-head remaining on its glacial foundation. This process has now been affected by the protection of the spit put in place during the Victorian era. This protection halted the wash-over process and resulted in the spit being even more exposed due to the rest of the coast moving back 110 yards (100 metres) since the 'protection' was constructed. The now crumbling defences will not be replaced and the spit will continue to move westwards at a rate of 6 feet 7 inches (2 metres) per year, keeping pace with the coastal erosion further north.

The second of the Six Studies in English Folk Song composed in 1926 by Ralph Vaughan Williams, the Andante sostenuto in E flat "Spurn Point" celebrates this peninsula.

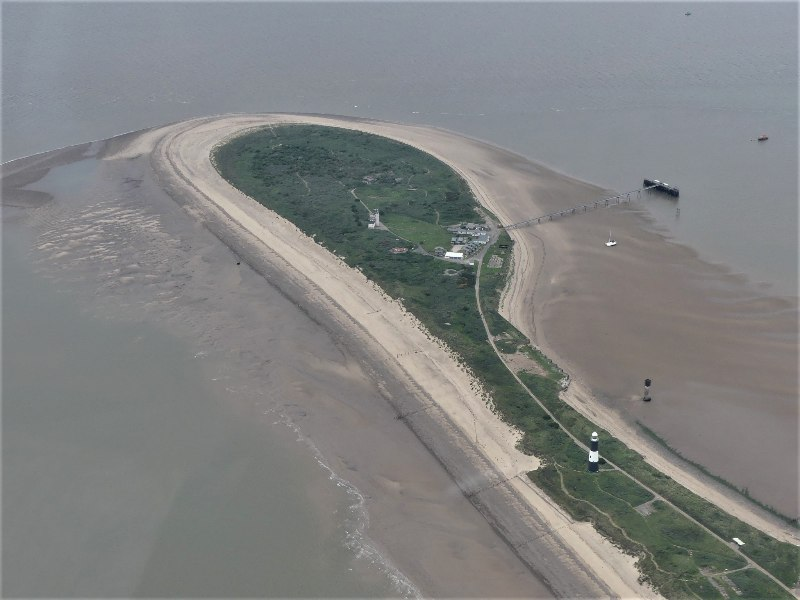
Aerial view of the Point in 2021.

It was featured on the television programme Seven Natural Wonders as one of the wonders of Yorkshire.

== Ecology ==
The landward-side mud flats are an important feeding ground for wading birds, and the area has a bird observatory, for monitoring migrating birds and providing accommodation to visiting birdwatchers. Their migration is assisted by east winds in autumn, resulting in drift migration of Scandinavian migrants, sometimes leading to a spectacular "fall" of thousands of birds. Many uncommon species have been sighted there, including a cliff swallow from North America, a lanceolated warbler from Siberia and a black-browed albatross from the Southern Ocean. More commonly, birds such as northern wheatears, whinchats, common redstarts and flycatchers alight at Spurn on their way between breeding and wintering grounds elsewhere. When the wind is in the right direction migrants are funnelled down Spurn Point and are counted at the Narrows Watchpoint, more than 15,000 birds can fly past on a good morning in autumn with 3,000 quite normal.

== Lighthouses ==
Spurn Point Lighthouse
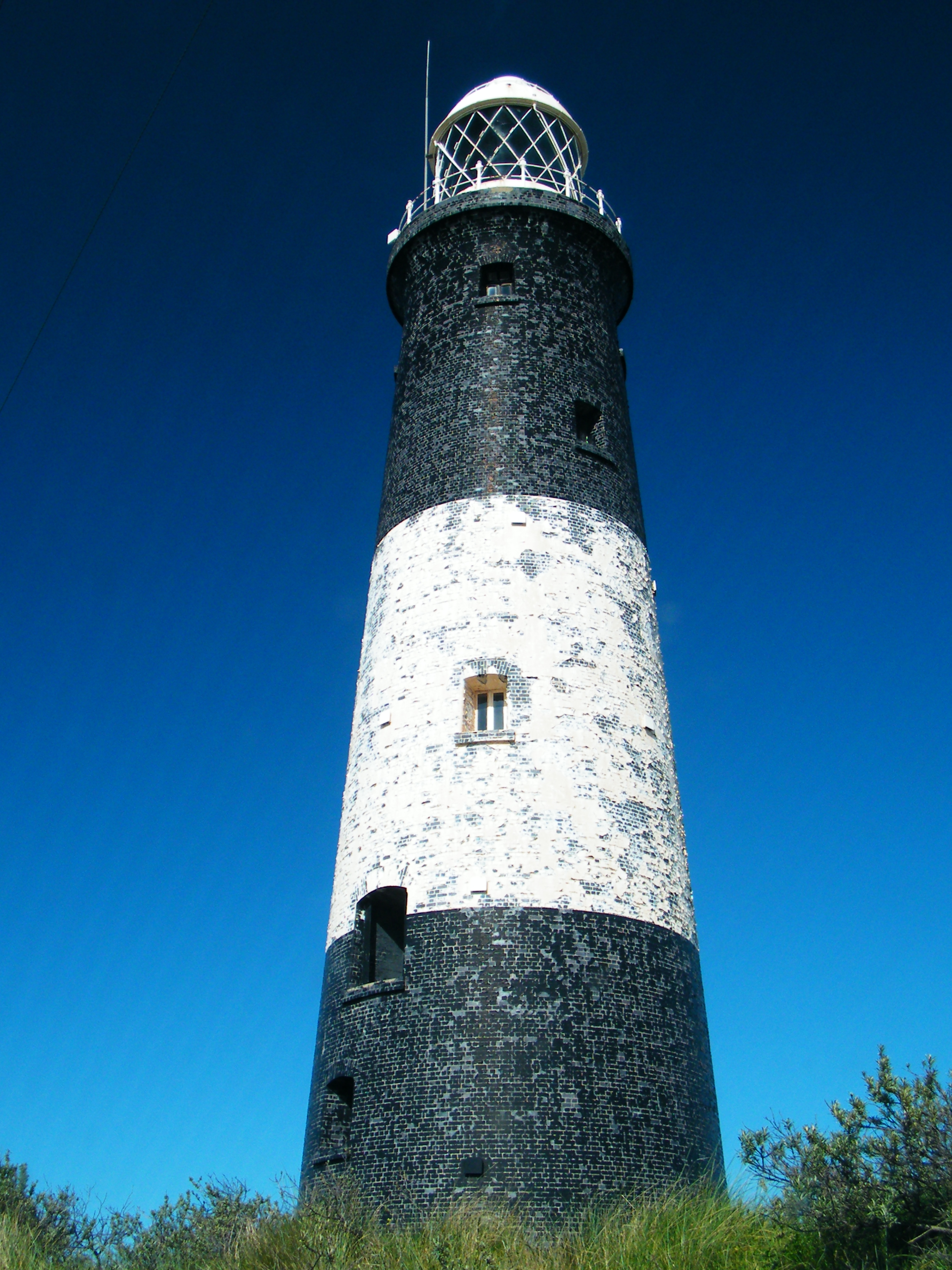
- Location: Spurn Point; East Riding of Yorkshire; England
- OS grid: TA 40345 11239
- Coordinates: 53.578996°N 0.118325°E

Tower
- Constructed: 1895
- Designed by: Thomas Matthews
- Construction: brick tower
- Automated: 1957
- Height: 128 ft (39 m)
- Shape: cylindrical tower with balcony and lantern
- Markings: white and black bands tower, white lantern
- Operator: Spurn Point National Nature Reserve
- Heritage: Grade II listed building

Light
- Deactivated: 1985
- Lens: 6-panel hyper-radial rotating catadioptric (1895-1957); 3-panel 3rd-order rotating catadioptric (1857-1985)
- Range: 17 nmi (31 km)
- Characteristic: Fl W 15 s Oc RW (sector lights)

The earliest reference to a lighthouse on Spurn Point is 1427, when a certain Richard Reedbarrow ('Hermit of the Chapel of Our Lady and St Anne at Ravenspurn') petitioned Parliament for permission to levy dues on ships entering the Humber from the sea, in recognition of his having built a tower (to serve as a beacon by day and a light by night), 'that should teach the people to hold in the right channel'. Permission was duly granted by Letters Patent of King Henry VI, on 28 November that year (though it is not known whether or for how long the tower remained in service).

From the 17th century there are records of a pair of lighthouses being maintained as leading lights: a high light and a low light.

=== Old High and Low Lights ===
There is evidence that Hull Trinity House maintained beacons on Spurn Head in the 16th century, but these were unlit seamarks. Demands for a light on the spit grew over the following century, and in the 1670s the (disputed) landowner, Justinian Angell, set about erecting a pair of lighthouses; he was granted a patent to levy dues for the lights on 25 October 1675. Angell's high light lasted for just over a century, but the low light had to be rebuilt on several occasions. Over time, the lights gained a reputation for being unreliable, and an act of Parliament, the Spurn Point Lighthouse Act 1766 (6 Geo. 3. c. 31) was passed 'for taking down and removing certain Lighthouses now standing near the Spurn-Point at the mouth of the Humber, and for erecting other fit and convenient lighthouses instead thereof'.

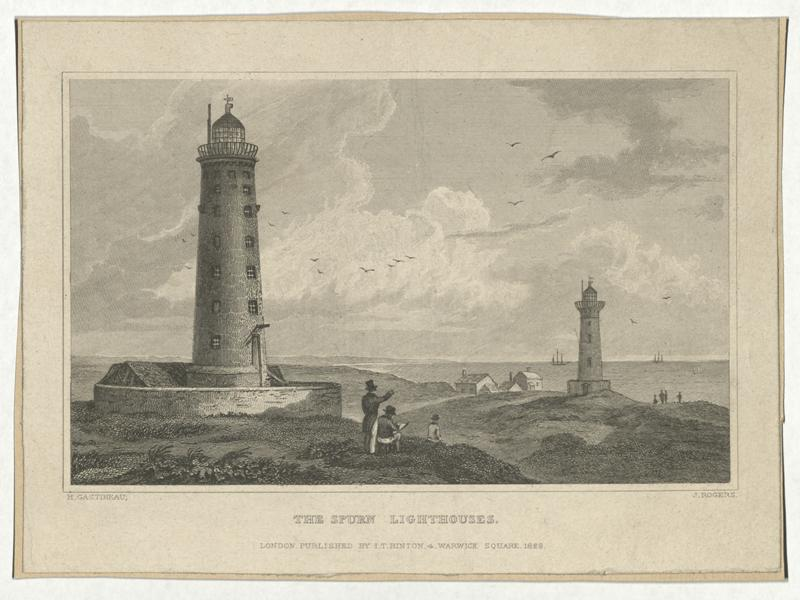
John Smeaton's High Light and John Shaw's Low Light (engraving by H. Gastineau, 1829).

In 1767, therefore, John Smeaton was commissioned to build a new pair of lighthouses; the work was jointly overseen by the London and Hull Trinity Houses (albeit the Angell family would continue to receive the dues once the work was complete). They were first lit on 5 September 1776. Smeaton's high light, a 90-foot (27 m) red-brick tower, remained in use until 1895, but there were problems (as there had been in previous years) with maintaining the low light, and after only a year or two it was washed away during a heavy storm. In its place, a moveable wooden swape-style light was used for a number of years. By 1815 the swape was much decayed and the light had become unreliable, so the following year a new Low Lighthouse was built (a 50 ft (15 m) brick tower, designed by John Shaw); it was first lit on 25 November 1816. In November 1829, however, a storm severely undermined the foundations of Shaw's tower, and two months later it was decommissioned. In its place a moveable wooden tower was used for the low light, which remained in use until it too was swept away in a storm, in March 1851. The following year, a new Low Lighthouse was constructed in stone, designed by James Walker and built under the supervision of engineer Henry Norris. Unlike its predecessors, this low light was built on the estuary side (i.e. to the west) of the high light, rather than on the seaward side.

==== Lighting arrangements ====
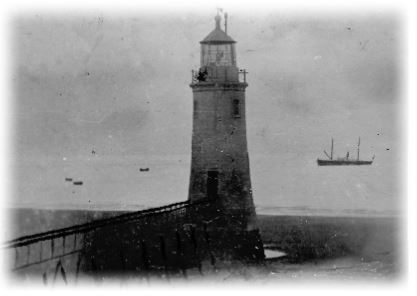
James Walker's new (1852) Low Light, while still operational.

Initially both lighthouses were coal-fired. When the low light was rebuilt in 1816, it was equipped with Argand lamps and reflectors. As a result, it outshone the high light; so in 1819 Smeaton's high tower was likewise fitted with Argand lamps and reflectors (24 in number).

The wooden low light, in use after 1830, had a smaller lantern than its predecessor; in 1848, it was equipped with a small Fresnel lens (a fifth-order lenticular dioptric) and this was reused, in Walker's tower, when the low light was rebuilt in 1852. The following year, a Fresnel lens was installed in Smeaton's tower (the high light): this was a large (first-order) fixed optic, made by Henry Lepaute of Paris. (Prior to installation this lens had been exhibited at the Great Exhibition of 1851). In 1867 a red sector was added, which warned ships of hazards to the south ranging from Clee Ness to Sand Haile Flats; (initially applied to the low light, it was moved to the high light in 1871). The high light was made occulting (once every half minute) in 1883.

==== Decommissioning of the High and Low Lights ====
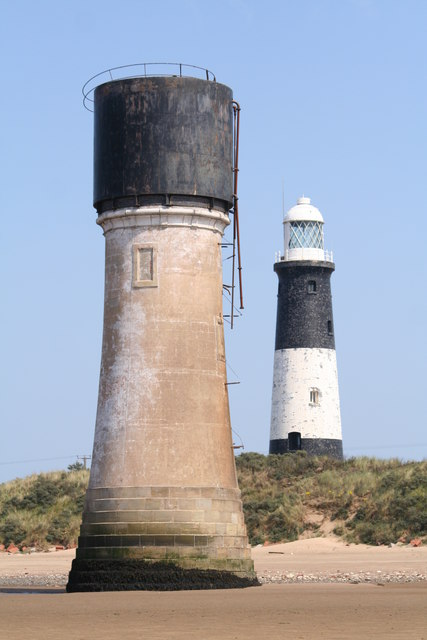
The former Low Light (1852) with the "new" (1895) lighthouse behind it

In 1895 both Walker's low light and Smeaton's high light were decommissioned; they were replaced by a single lighthouse, which still stands on the grass of Spurn Head. The 1852 low light also still stands on the sandy shore of the island, though its lantern has been replaced by a large water tank; the tower served for a number of years as an explosives store. Of the old Smeaton high light only the foundations remain (after dismantling, its optic was re-used in the high lighthouse at Nash Point, where it was installed as part of a programme of improvements). Keepers' cottages had been constructed within the circular compound of the old High Lighthouse, and these remained in use after its demolition up until the 1950s.

=== The new Spurn Lighthouse ===
The 1895 lighthouse is a round brick tower, 128 feet (39 metres) high, painted black and white. It was designed by Thomas Matthews. The lantern contained a very large revolving hyper-radiant optic by Chance Brothers & Co. Its white light had a range of 17 nautical miles (31 kilometres) and displayed a flash once every 20 seconds. In addition there were separate sector lights, two of which marked particular shoals or sandbanks, while another indicated the main channel along the Humber. Initially oil-lit, the lighthouse was converted to electricity in 1941 to enable the light to be lit briefly (as and when requested by allied ships and convoys) and then extinguished; power was drawn from nearby generators maintained by the military garrison.

Then, in 1957, the lighthouse was converted to acetylene gas operation. A new, smaller, gas-driven revolving optic was installed, which flashed once every fifteen seconds; and the subsidiary lights were provided with occulting mechanisms, also gas-driven. The new systems were automated; the keepers therefore moved out and their cottages were demolished.

Due to improvements in navigation, the light was discontinued in 1985; the main optic was removed the following year. The combined acetylene lamp and gas-powered optic were subsequently put on display, first in the Trinity House National Lighthouse Museum, then (for a time) in the National Maritime Museum Cornwall.

After 1986 the lighthouse remained empty; but in 2013, Yorkshire Wildlife Trust was awarded a £470,500 grant to restore the lighthouse with a view to its being reopened as a visitor centre. Work began in 2015; it was completed in March the following year, and opened to the public for the Easter weekend.

== Gallery ==
=== Spurn Point ===
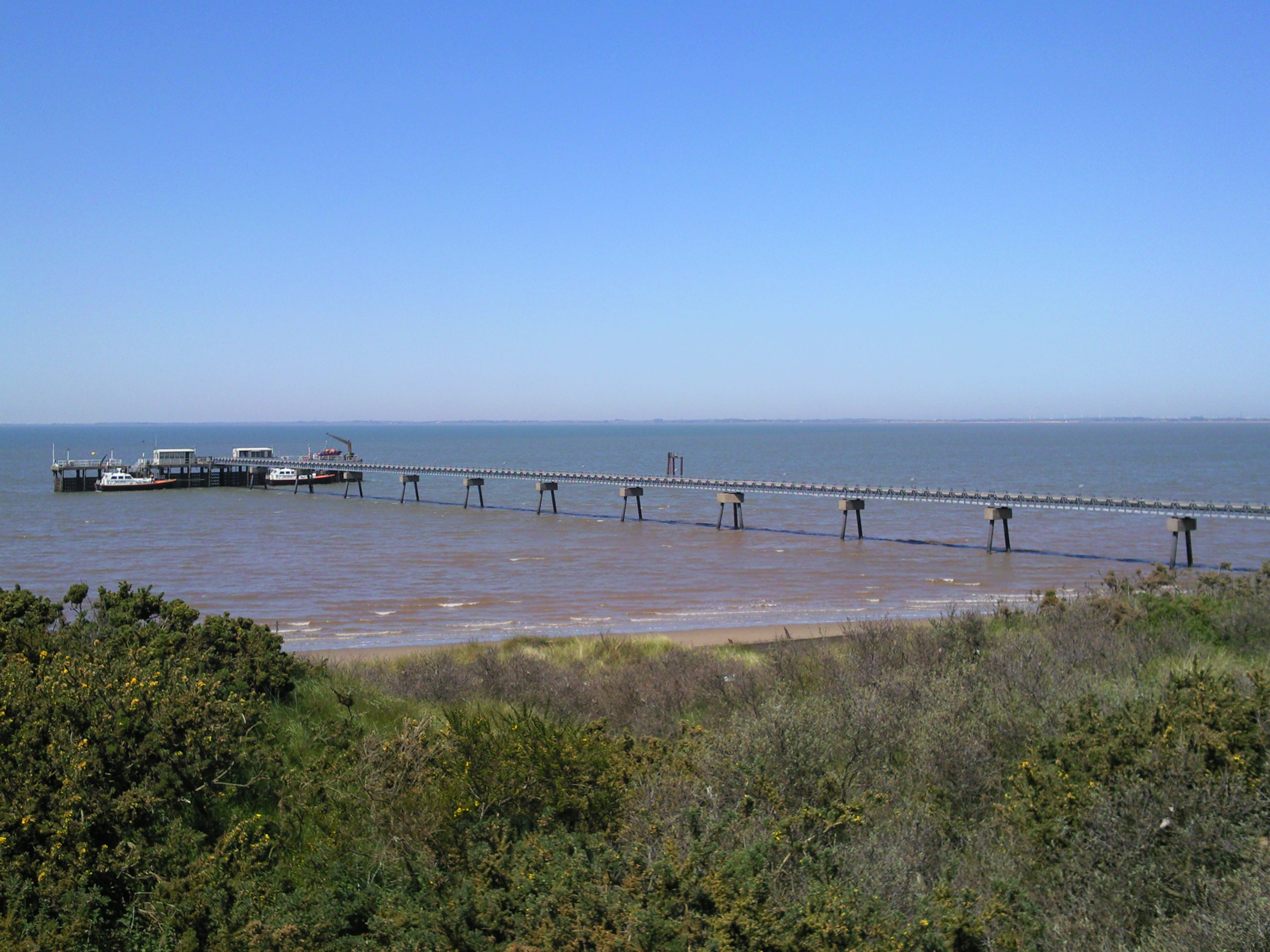
The pier and launching platform for the RNLI at Spurn

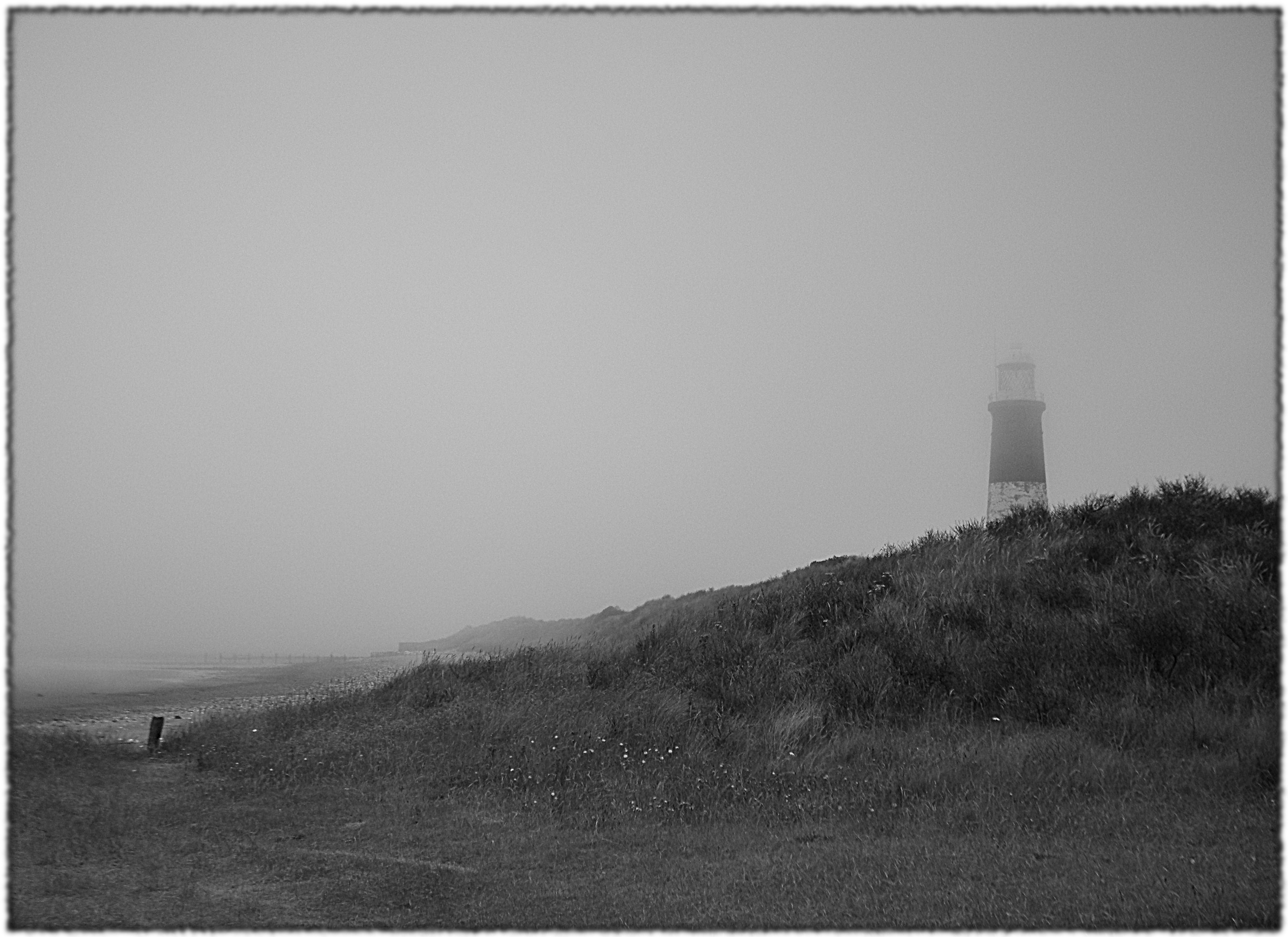
Sea mist

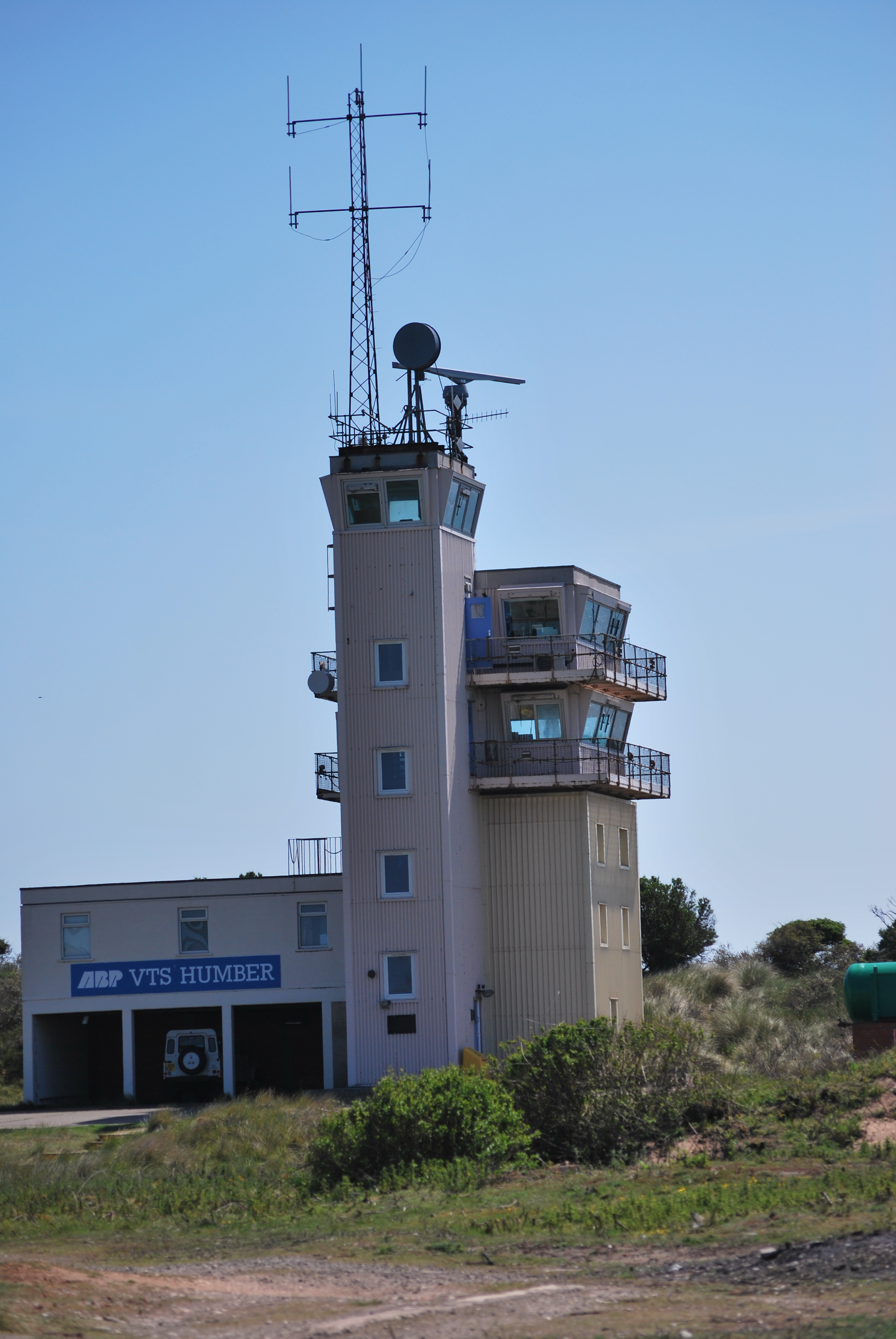
Humber Vessel traffic service

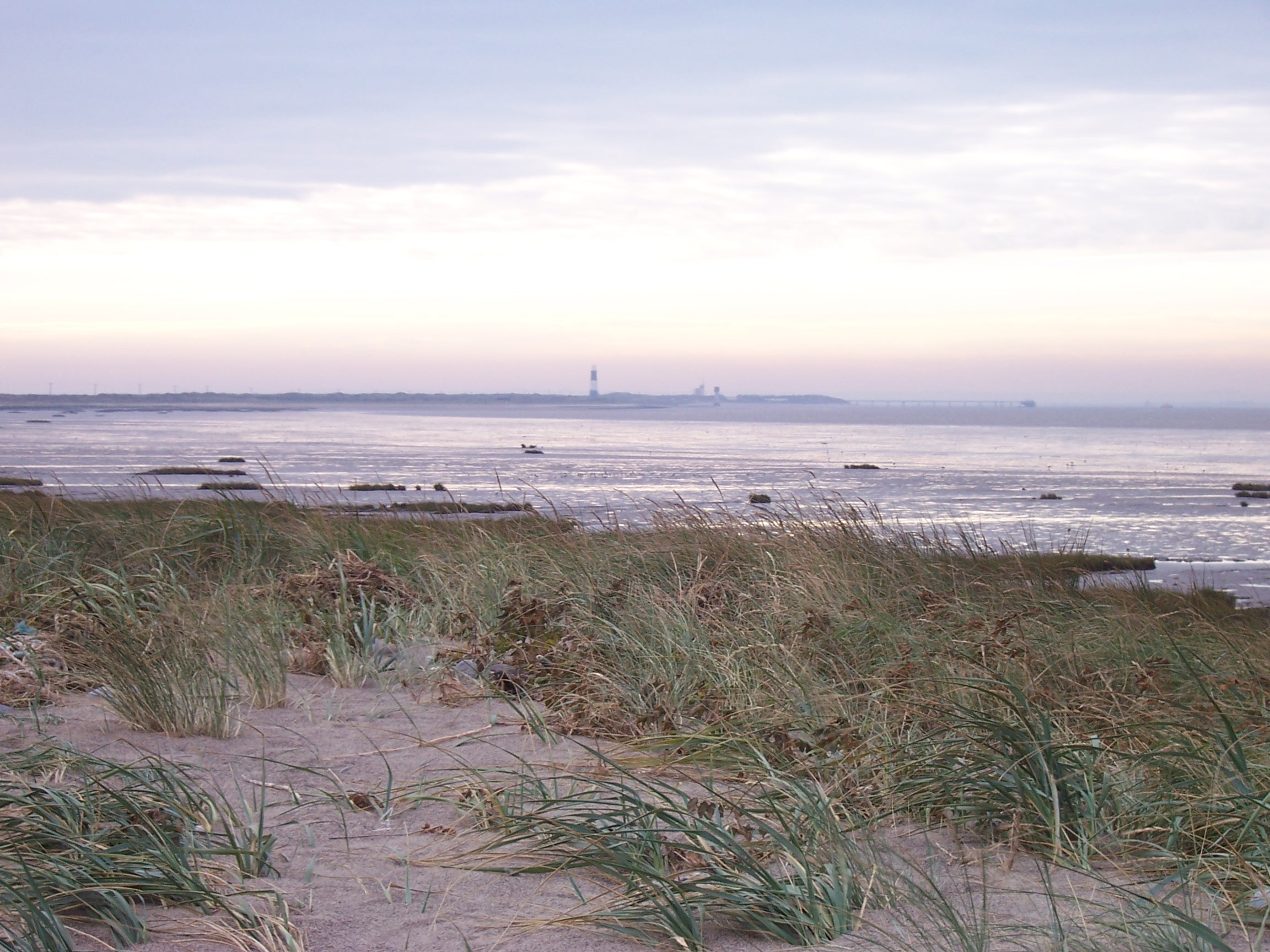
Spurn Point from the mainland

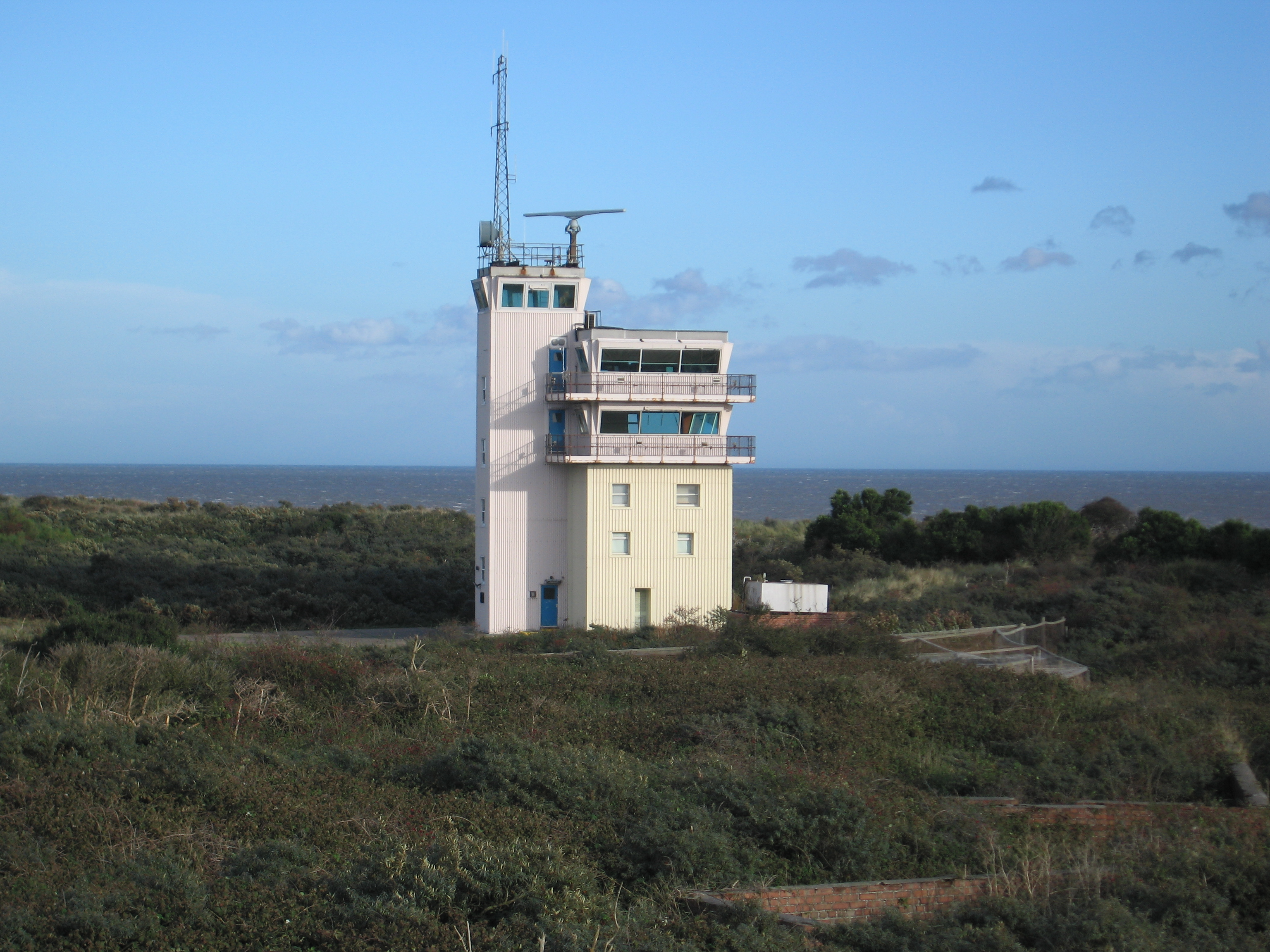
Humber Vessel traffic service

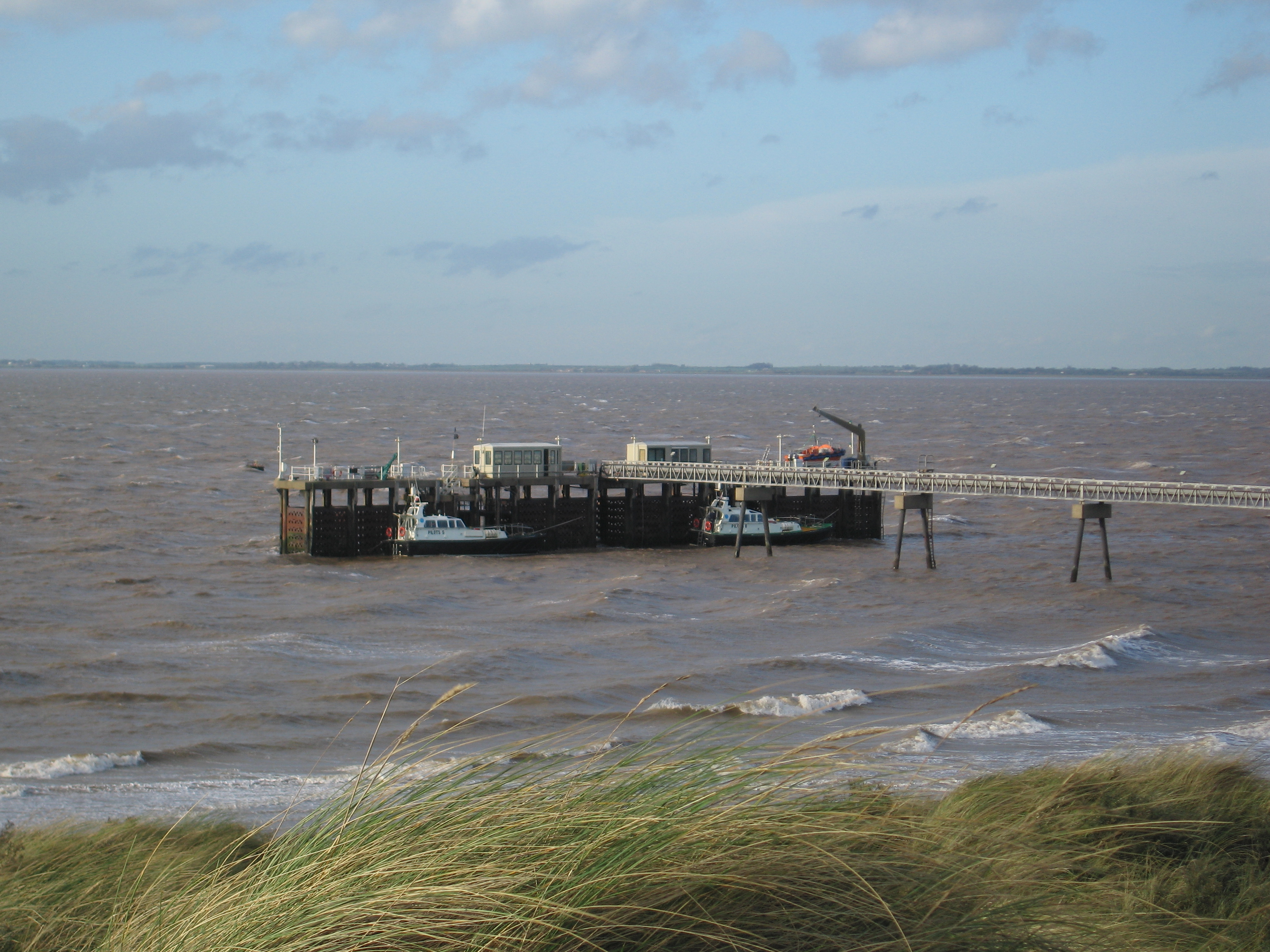
RNLI Platform

=== Spurn Lighthouses ===
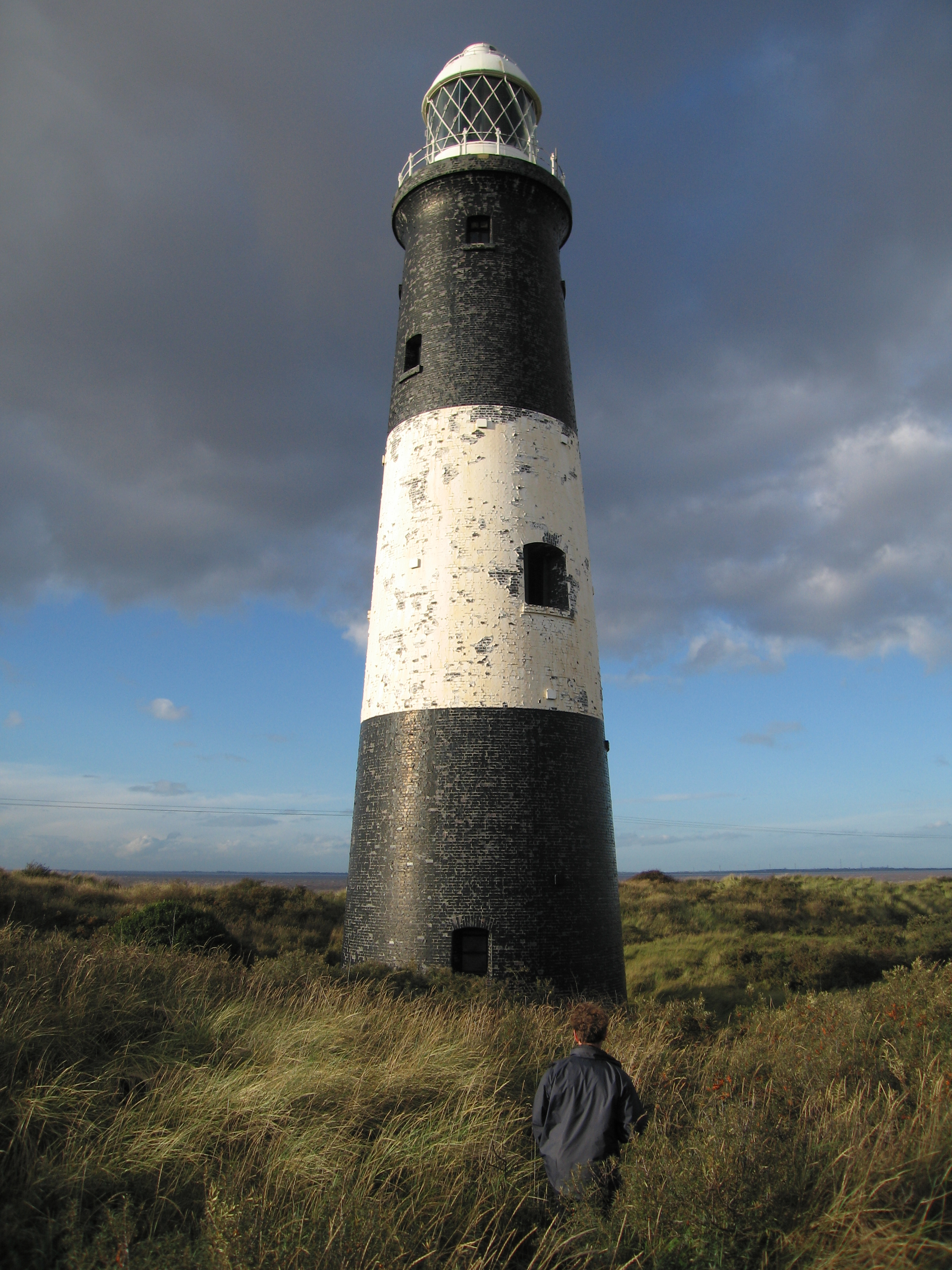
The lighthouse at Spurn Point

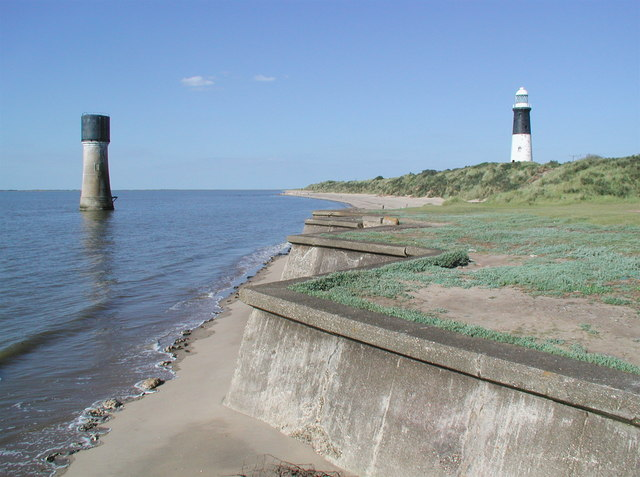
The old Low Light (1852) seen alongside the new (1895) lighthouse

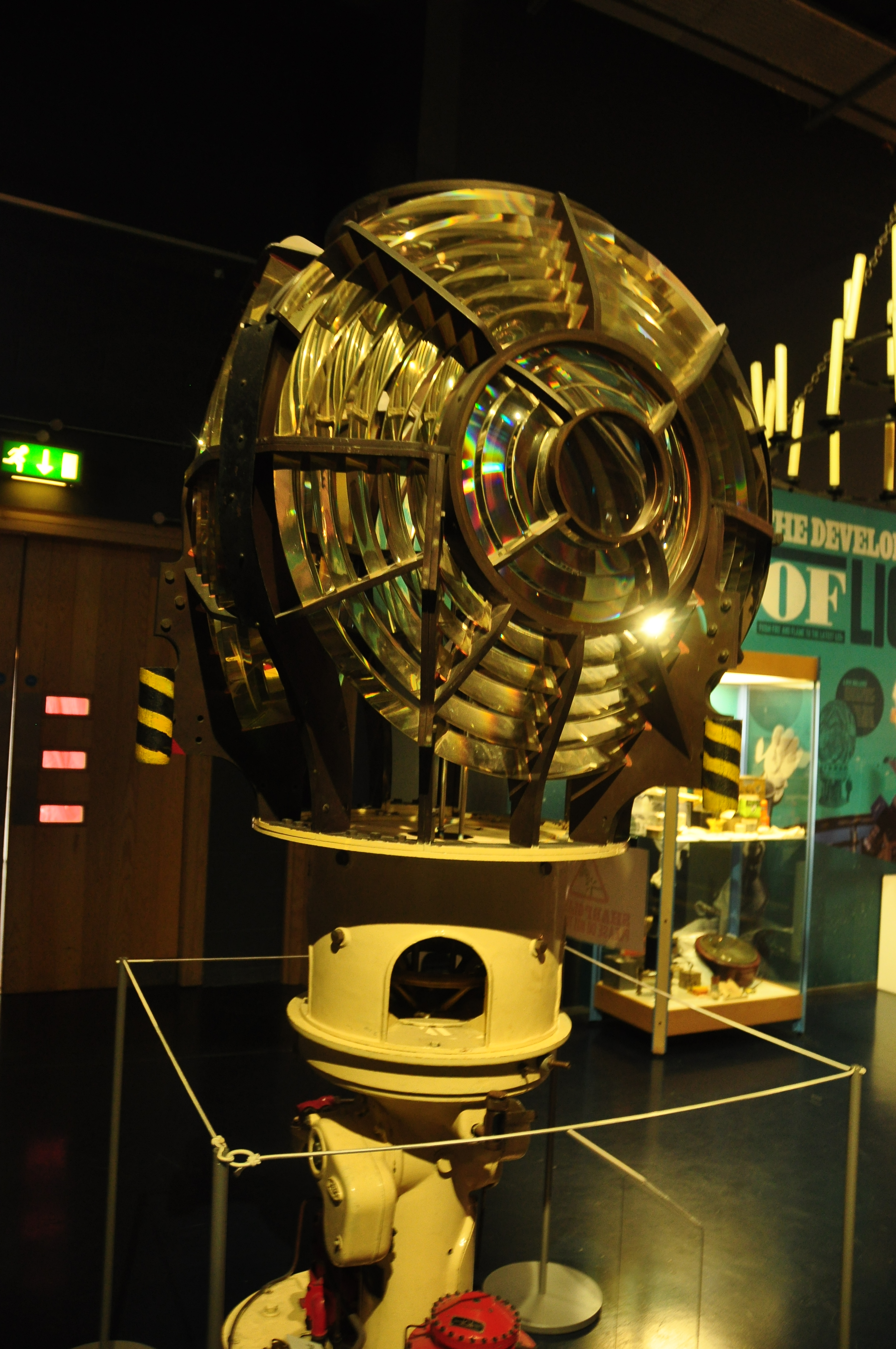
The 1957 optic in the National Maritime Museum, Cornwall

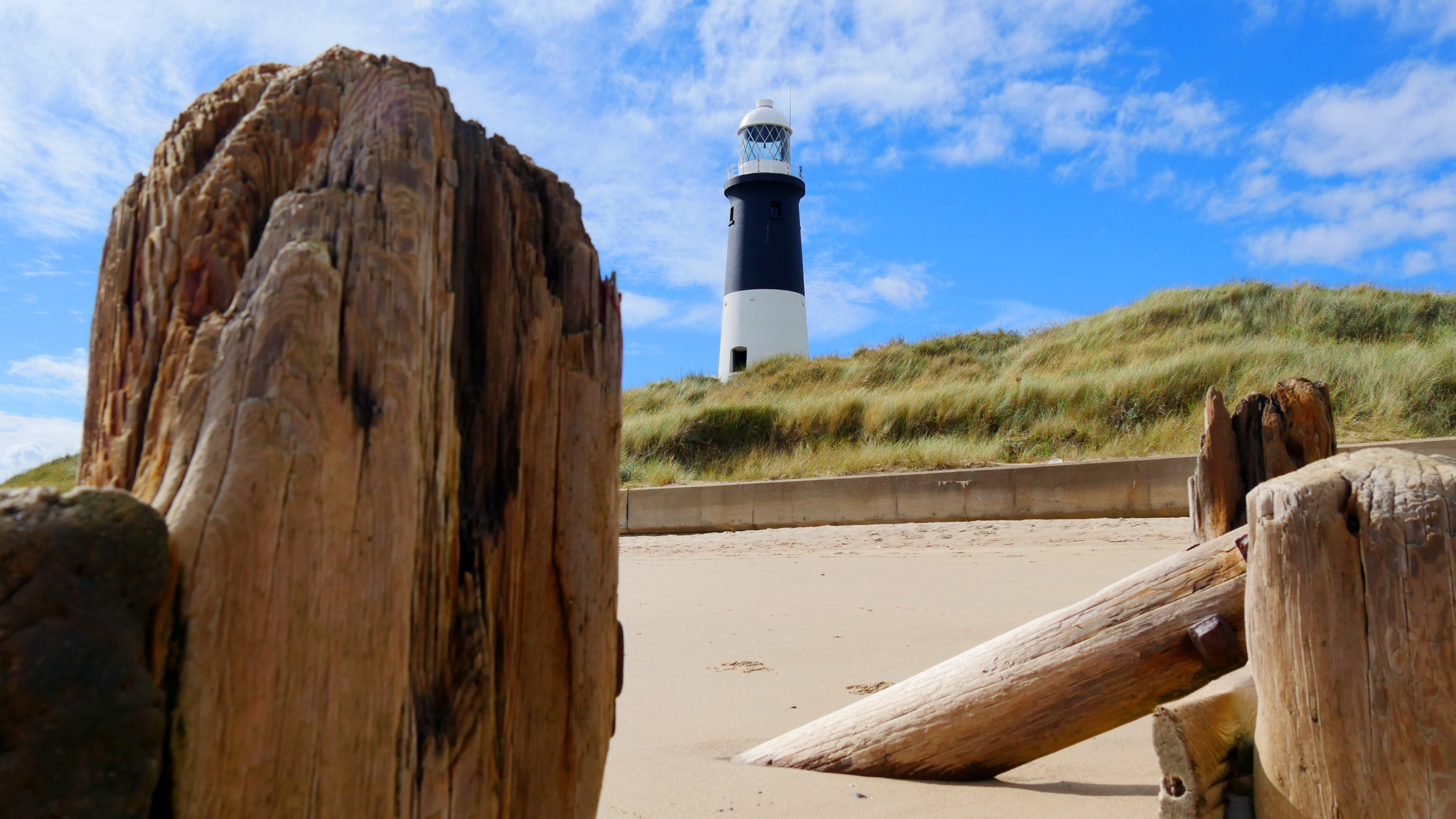
The lighthouse seen from the beach

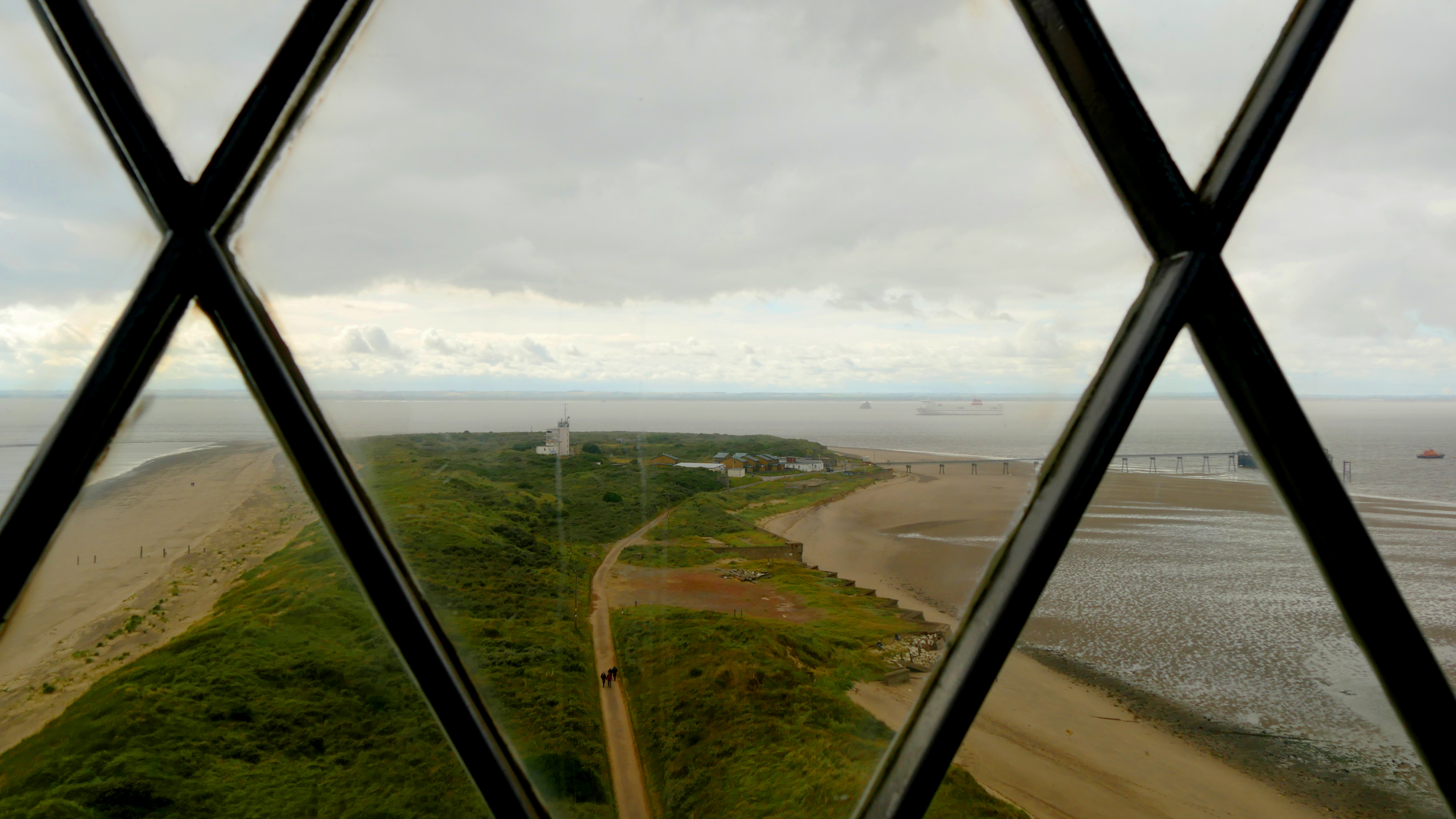
Spurn Point seen from the lighthouse

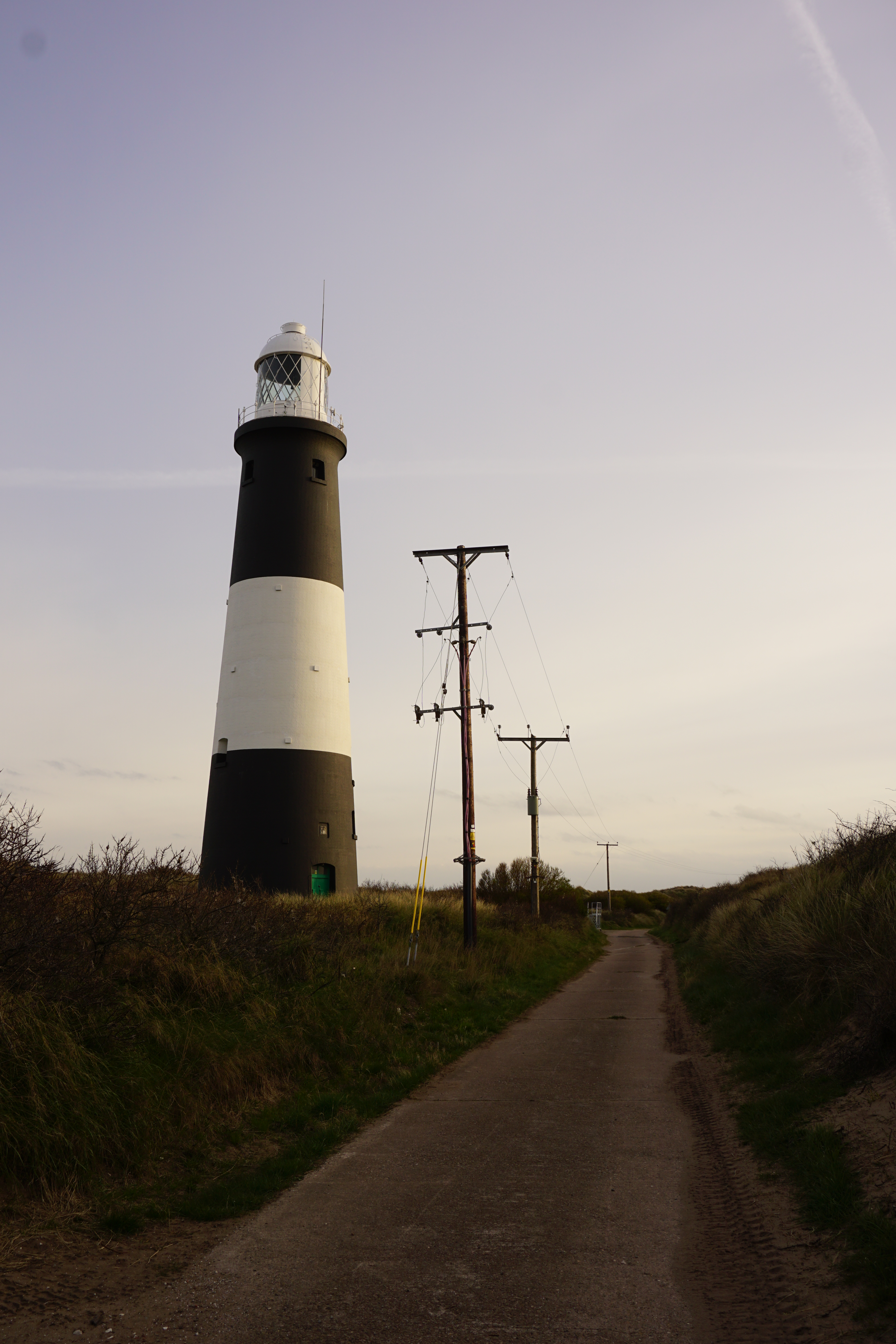
The newly-restored lighthouse in April 2016

== See also ==
Spurn Point Lighthouse Act 1772
- Act of Parliament
- Parliament of Great Britain
- Long title: An Act to explain and amend an Act, paired in the Sixth Year of the Reign of His present Majesty, intituled, "An Act for taking down and removing certain Lighthouses now standing near the Spurn Point, at the Mouth of the Humber; and for erecting other fit and convenient Lighthouses instead thereof."
- Citation: 12 Geo. 3. c. 29
- Territorial extent: Great Britain

Dates
- Royal assent: 21 May 1772
- Commencement: 21 January 1772 (Note: Start of session.)
- Repealed: 6 August 1861
Other legislation
Repealed by	Statute Law Revision Act 1861
Relates to	Spurn Point Lighthouse Act 1766

Status: Repealed

Text of statute as originally enacted

- Humber Forts
- Spurn Lightship
- Spurn Point Military Railway
- Listed buildings in Easington, East Riding of Yorkshire
