= Listed buildings in Acklam, Ryedale =

Acklam is a civil parish in the county of North Yorkshire, England. It contains four listed buildings that are recorded in the National Heritage List for England. All the listed buildings are designated at Grade II, the lowest of the three grades, which is applied to "buildings of national importance and special interest". The parish contains the village of Acklam and the surrounding countryside. All the listed buildings are in the village, and all are houses or cottages.

== Buildings ==
Name and location	Photograph	Date	Notes
Woodlands; 54.04398°N 0.80241°W		17th century	A limestone house with sprocketed eaves and a pantile roof. There are two storeys and three bays. In the ground floor is a casement window, and the upper floor windows are fixed.
Merton House; 54.04545°N 0.80288°W	—	Early to mid 18th century	The house is in limestone with a floor band, an eaves band with consoles, and a pantile roof with coped gables and shaped kneelers. There are two storeys, three bays, a later extension to the left, and a cross-wing at the rear. In the centre is a round-arched doorway with a rusticated surround and a fanlight, and the windows have lintels and keystones.
House formerly known As Bassetts; 54.04548°N 0.80448°W	—	Late 18th to early 19th century	The house is in sandstone and has a pantile roof with coped gables and shaped kneelers. There are two storeys and two bays. The windows are casements with stone lintels and keystones.
1-5 Main Street; 54.04534°N 0.80428°W	—	Early 19th century	A terrace of five cottages in sandstone with a pantile roof. There are two storeys and five bays. The windows are a mix of horizontally-sliding sashes, and casements, and the ground floor openings have cambered brick arches.
