= William Jackson Bean =

British botanist and plantsman (1863–1947)

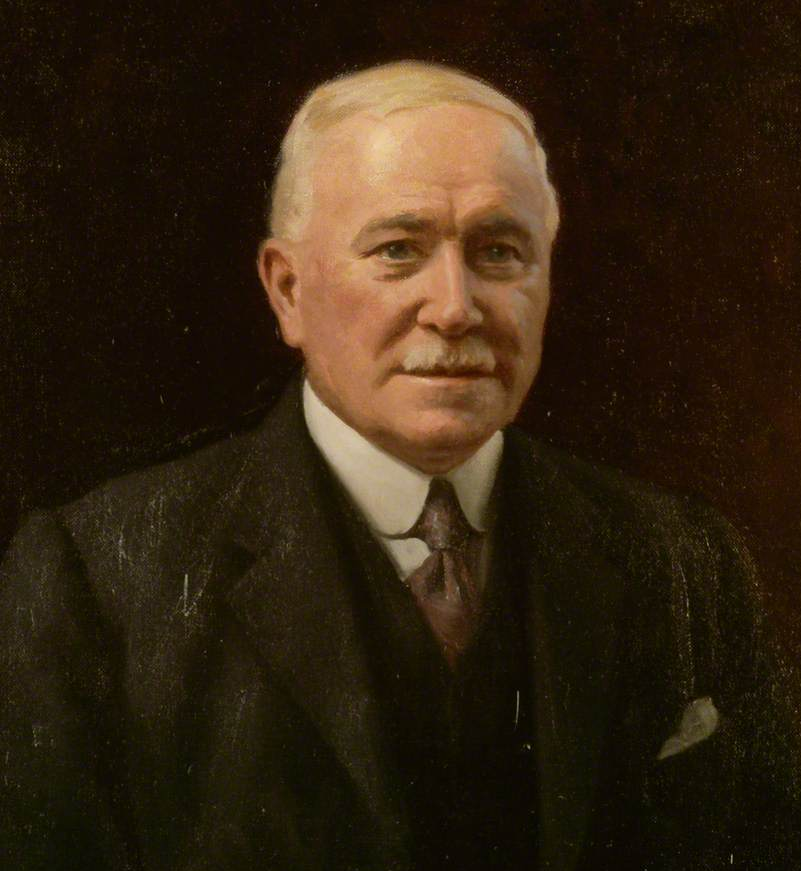
- Born: 26 May 1863; Leavening, North Riding of Yorkshire
- Died: 19 April 1947 (aged 83); Kew, Surrey
- Scientific career
- Fields: Botany
- Author abbrev. (botany): Bean

William Jackson Bean CVO ISO (26 May 1863 in Leavening, North Riding of Yorkshire – 19 April 1947 in Kew, Surrey) was a British botanist and plantsman, who was curator of Kew Gardens from 1922 to 1929. He was responsible for some of the present collections of trees and woody plants there.

== Biography ==
Bean was born in the little village of Leavening, near Malton in North Yorkshire in 1863. His mother was Lydia, née Jackson. His father was George Bean (c. 1833–1869), a nurseryman, as were his grandfather and greatgrandfather. His father died early. His mother worked as a nursery and seed dealer. After education at Archbishop Holgate's School, Bean became at age sixteen an apprentice gardener at the gardens of Belvoir Castle, Leicestershire, the seat of the Duke of Rutland. At age twenty, Bean began his career at Kew Gardens as a trainee gardener. He remained at Kew for over 45 years, reaching the position of curator in 1922. Bean wrote a history of Kew Gardens, which was published in 1908.

He wrote the first two-volume edition of the reference work Trees and Shrubs Hardy in the British Isles, which was published in 1914. A revised four-volume edition of this work remains a standard reference work for woody plants grown in Britain today.

Bean retired from Kew in 1929. In his retirement, Bean wrote three other books: Shrubs for Amateurs in 1924, Ornamental Trees for Amateurs in 1925, and Wall Shrubs and Hardy Climbers in 1939. He also revised and expanded Trees and Shrubs several times.

Bean was awarded the Victoria Medal of Honour in 1917 and the Veitch Memorial Medal of the Royal Horticultural Society in 1922. He was appointed a Companion of the Imperial Service Order (ISO) in the 1924 Birthday Honours and a Commander of the Royal Victorian Order (CVO) in the 1936 Birthday Honours.

Bean was a widower at the time of his death. His son, George Ewart Bean (1903–1977) was a leading authority on the classical heritage of Turkey.

== Bibliography ==
- Bean, W. J. (1908). The Royal botanic gardens, Kew : historical and descriptive. London: Cassel & Cie.
- —— (1914). Trees and Shrubs Hardy in the British Isles. London: John Murray. (in two volumes). Several new, revised and expanded editions, until 1976.

== Sources ==
- Elliott, Brent (2014). "It's Bean a century". The Garden. 139 (5). Royal Horticultural Society: 94–96.
- Stearn, Roger T. (2010). "Bean, William Jackson". Oxford Dictionary of National Biography (online ed.). Oxford University Press. doi:10.1093/ref:odnb/96756. (Subscription, Wikipedia Library access or UK public library membership required.)
