= Listed buildings in Leavening, North Yorkshire =

Leavening is a civil parish in the county of North Yorkshire, England. It contains five listed buildings that are recorded in the National Heritage List for England. All the listed buildings are designated at Grade II, the lowest of the three grades, which is applied to "buildings of national importance and special interest". The parish contains the village of Leavening and the surrounding countryside. All the listed buildings are houses or farmhouses.

== Buildings ==
Name and location	Photograph	Date	Notes
Brook House; 54.05656°N 0.79960°W	—	Late 18th century	The house is in brick, and has a pantile roof with shaped kneelers and gable coping. There are two storeys, a double depth plan, and three bays. The central doorway has a fanlight. Above it is a fixed-light window with a cambered brick arch, and the other windows are sashes with wedge lintels.
Ox Leys Farmhouse; 54.05461°N 0.81778°W	—	Late 18th century	The farmhouse is in sandstone, with paired eaves consoles, and a Westmorland slate roof with gable coping and shaped kneelers. There are three storeys and three bays. The central doorway has been replaced by a window with a round arch, a fanlight, and fluted pilasters. The windows are sashes with flat brick arches.
Madeira Cottage; 54.05910°N 0.81022°W	—	Early 19th century	The house is in brick on a limestone foundation, and has an eaves band, and a hipped Westmorland slate roof. There are two storeys and three bays, the middle bay projecting under a pediment. In the centre is a double door with a fanlight, and the windows are sashes.
Mount Pleasant Farmhouse; 54.06083°N 0.80576°W		Early 19th century	The farmhouse is in rendered brick, and has a pantile roof with shaped kneelers and gable coping. There are two storeys and two bays. Steps lead up to the doorway that has a divided fanlight and friezes with paterae, and the windows are casements with wedge lintels.
Southfield Farmhouse; 54.05745°N 0.80374°W	—	Early 19th century	The farmhouse is in sandstone] with brick quoins and a pantile roof. There are two storeys, two bays and a rear cross-wing. The doorway has a divided fanlight, and the windows are sashes with wedge lintels.
