= Ravensrodd (Parliament of England constituency) =

Constituency of the Parliament of England (1295–1337)

Coordinates: 53.585089°N 0.158821°E

- Former borough constituency for the House of Commons

1295–1337

Ravensrodd, also spelt Ravenser Odd, was a constituency of the House of Commons of the Parliament of England, first represented in the Model Parliament of 1295. It was represented by two Members of Parliament intermittently, with the last known representation being in the Parliament of 1344.

The constituency was a Parliamentary borough in the East Riding of Yorkshire, consisting of the port of Ravensrodd at the mouth of the Humber estuary. The sandbanks on which the town was built shifted in the 14th century, and it was entirely swept away. The site is now underwater.

== See also ==
- List of former United Kingdom Parliament constituencies
