= Martin de la See =

Sir Martin de la See
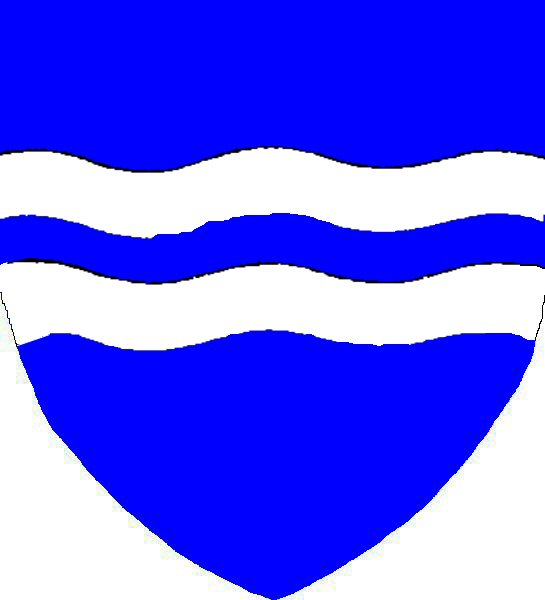
- Born: 1420; England
- Died: 15 December 1494 (aged 73–74)
- Spouses: Margaret Spencer; Elizabeth Wentworth; Margery
- Children: Christopher de la See; Margaret de la See; Joan de la See; Elizabeth de la See
- Parent(s): Brian de la See; Maud Monceaux

Sir Martin de la See of Barmston, East Riding of Yorkshire (1420 – 15 December 1494), was an English knight.

== Biography ==
Martin de la See was son of Brian de la See and wife Maud Monceaux, daughter and heiress of John Monceaux.

When Edward IV of England landed at Ravenspur in March 1471 he led local resistance. Knighted on 24 July 1482 by Henry Percy, 4th Earl of Northumberland following the siege of Edrington Castle, Scotland, he would serve as commissioner of the peace for East Riding of Yorkshire from 1484 to 1494.

Martin died between 20 November and 15 December 1494 and was buried in the choir in All Hallows, Barmston, East Riding of Yorkshire, with effigy.

== Marriages and issue ==
He married, firstly, Margaret Spencer, daughter and heiress of Christopher Spencer, by whom they had one son, Christopher de la See, who died in his father's lifetime, and one daughter, Margaret de la See, who later married Sir Henry Boynton of Acklam, North Riding of Yorkshire.

He married, secondly, Elizabeth Wentworth, daughter of Sir Philip Wentworth of Nettlestead, Suffolk, and wife Mary Clifford, daughter of John Clifford, 7th Baron de Clifford and wife Elizabeth Percy, by whom he had two daughters. The first, Joan de la See, married Sir Peter Hildyard of Winestead, Yorkshire, son of Robert Hildyard and wife Elizabeth Hastings. They are ancestors to Meghan, Duchess of Sussex. The second daughter, Elizabeth de la See, married Roger Kelke of Barnetby le Wold, Lincolnshire, son of Sir Roger Kelke and wife Eleanor Ingelbert.

He married for the third time, before 20 November 1494, to Margery.

== Bibliography ==
- Harvey, W; et al. (1930). Visitations of the North. 3. Surtees Society. 144.
