= Lagoon Hull =

Proposed lagoon in the Humber Estuary, England

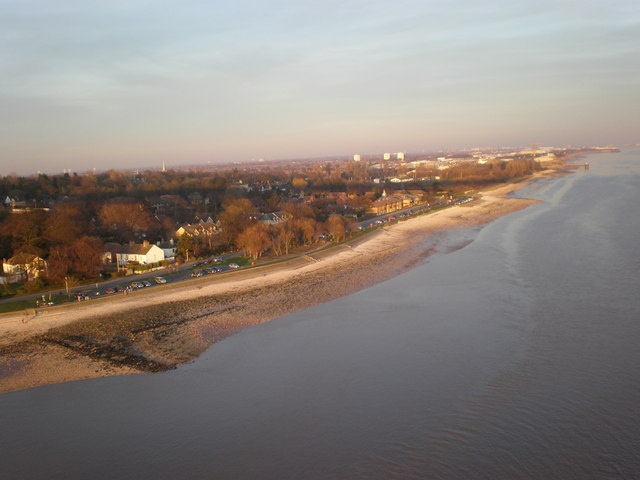
- Looking east from the Humber Bridge, along the Yorkshire coast of the Humber Estuary

Project
- Completed: 2030–2035 (projected)
- Construction cost: £1.5 billion (2020 estimate)
- Status: Planned
- Website: Official website

Physical features
- Streets: A63 road

Location
- Location within East Riding of Yorkshire
- Coordinates: 53.727°N 0.367°W
- Country: England
- County: East Riding of Yorkshire
- Places: Kingston upon Hull and Hessle

Lagoon Hull is a proposed £1.5 billion development on the Humber Estuary foreshore between Hessle and Kingston upon Hull, in the East Riding of Yorkshire, England. The proposed lagoon would be formed from a stone causeway and will provide an outer lock gate in the Humber Estuary which would effectively dam the River Hull, making it a non-tidal waterway. The 11-kilometre (6.8 mi) long causeway would also provide a dual carriageway from the A63 at Hessle which would run to Hull Docks, taking traffic away from the city centre. The scheme is being vaunted as one that will prevent future flooding in Hull when sea levels rise, and contribute to less flooding in the wider Humber Estuary.

An additional part of the scheme is to create a larger dock area which is protected from wave and tidal action, providing a safe haven for shipping.

== History ==
Severe flooding has affected the City of Hull throughout the 20th and 21st centuries. (Note: Hull suffers from four different types of flooding; pluvial, fluvial, tidal surge and groundwater flooding.) A tidal surge in 1969 prompted the development of the River Hull tidal surge barrier, which only prevents flooding upstream of the barrier on the River Hull, whereas 90% of the city, and its foreshore environs, is 2 metres (6 ft 7 in) below the spring high-tide line. In the 2013 floods and tidal surge, the barrier at Hull came within centimetres of being overwhelmed, and whilst it prevented major flooding in the city, (Note: However, many locations on the waterfront of Hull where it borders the Humber Estuary were inundated. Under the proposed lagoon, these areas would not see a reoccurrence in flooding.) the Port of Immingham, on the south bank of the estuary, was subjected to flooding.

One of the suggestions to combat this was a barrier across the entire Humber Estuary, which would protect many localities on both sides of the estuary. However, this would need to be four times larger than the Thames Barrier and was costed in 2019 at £10 billion. After the 2013 floods, Members of Parliament and the Local Enterprise Partnership, asked the government for money to shore up the flood defences.

The project for a lagoon was announced in 2019, but had been in development for six years before it was unveiled to the public.

== Lagoon proposal ==
A stone causeway would run from the foreshore at Hessle to Hull docks, creating a lagoon by effectively damming the outlet of the River Hull, which would then become non-tidal. The causeway would be over 11 kilometres (6.8 mi) long, with the newer dual carriageway covering 9.6 kilometres (6 mi), and the resultant lagoon, which would cover 5 square kilometres (1.9 sq mi), would be controlled by floodgates, allowing the water to exit into the Humber Estuary in a controlled manner, thereby acting as a flood defence for the city. This flood defence is labelled as being good enough to keep the city flood free from tidal surges for 100 years. A study in relation to the 2013 flooding determined that were the lagoon to have been in place, it would afforded the city 100% protection and the wider estuary would have seen a reduction in flooding of 80%.

A diagram of the proposed Lagoon Hull. This is not to scale and is representational only. Not all roads or dock structures are detailed

The proposal for the lagoon includes a new section of dual carriageway, that would connect with the A63 road near to the Humber Bridge, and run along the edge of the lagoon avoiding the centre of Hull, and connecting with the A63, the A1165 and the A1033 in the eastern part of Hull near the docks. The proposal for the causeway will include pedestrian access and a cycle lane. East of the lagoon, a new 2-square-kilometre (0.77 sq mi) outer harbour development would also be created providing ease of access by shipping into the docks, and a completely new dock area, which would be protected from the tides and waves. The outer harbour development already has development consent and involves the use of 84 hectares (210 acres) of land. In 2019, the project was costed at £1.5 billion.

Independent analysis of the project by ABPmer, the University of Hull and the Environment Agency, determined that fears around making flooding worse (or creating flooding elsewhere in the estuary), were unfounded. As the estuary is only 6.5 metres (21 ft) deep on average, tidal surges do not work as they do on other river estuaries which are generally deeper. The causeway would actually contribute to less water entering the estuary during a tidal surge.

If sufficient funding were raised, and planning permission were to be granted, the project could only be delivered after feasibility studies were completed (five to ten years) and then a further five years of building would see the project delivered by 2030 at the earliest.

== See also ==
- Bransholme water works, has storage lagoons on the River Hull to regulate the flow of water
- Coastal erosion in Yorkshire
