= Ravenser Odd =

Former port in the East Riding of Yorkshire, England

Coordinates: 53.586°N 0.114°E

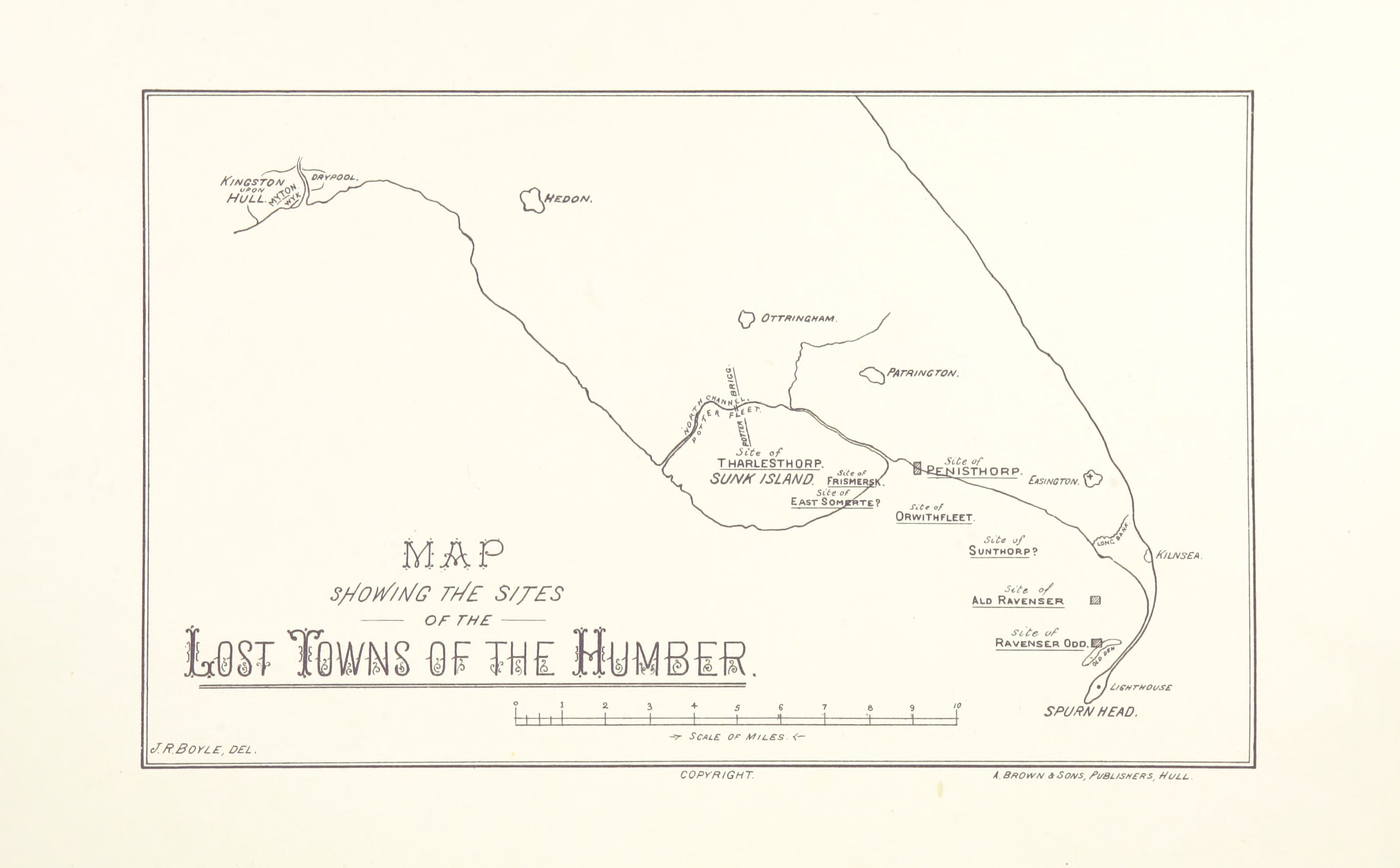
Map showing the location of the former town

Ravenser Odd, also spelled Ravensrodd, was a port in the East Riding of Yorkshire, England, during the medieval period, built on the sandbanks at the mouth of the Humber estuary.

The name Ravenser comes from the Old Norse Hrafn's Eyr or 'Raven's Ear' referring to the lost sandbank promontory, the modern successor of which is now known as Spurn Point. The town was founded by the Count of Aumale in the mid-13th century, and had more than 100 houses and a flourishing market by 1 April 1299, when it was granted a borough charter. The town had wharves, warehouses, a court and a prison. It collected dues from more than 100 merchant ships a year.

In the 13th century the town was a more important port than Kingston upon Hull further up the Humber, and sent two members to the Model Parliament of 1295. As the sandbanks shifted the town was swept away. The king granted them quayage, providing them funds to repair their damaged quay, in 1329, 1333, 1335, 1340, 1344, and 1347. An inquisition held in 1346 determined ongoing flood damage was so severe that only 1/3 of the townsfolk remained. Storms over the winter of 1356–57 completely flooded the town, leading to its abandonment, and it was largely destroyed by the Grote Mandrenke storm or Saint Marcellus's flood of January 1362. The site is now completely underwater. In 2022 the site was being searched for off Spurn Point, with hope that the foundations of the seawall and harbour would still remain. As of 2026 the site had yet to be found.

== See also ==
- Colden Parva
- Ravenspurn
- Strand (island)
