= St John the Baptist's Church, Acklam =

Church in Acklam, North Yorkshire, England

Coordinates: 54°02′42″N 0°48′24″W

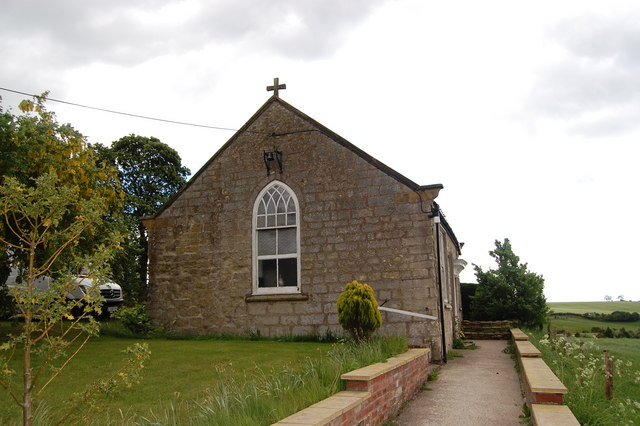
The church, in 2010

St John the Baptist's Church is an Anglican church in Acklam, a village near Malton, North Yorkshire, in England.

Acklam had a church in the medieval period. It was rebuilt in 1790, as a small building with a nave, chancel, south porch, and square west tower. It had a capacity of 250 worshippers. It was again rebuilt in 1868, by J. B. and W. Atkinson of York. The church was declared redundant and demolished in 1972, following which its site was used to enlarge the burial ground.

A Wesleyan Methodist Chapel was erected in Acklam in 1794. It is a rectangular stone building, with a pantile roof. It has Gothick pointed windows, with glazing bars. Following the closure of the church, it was acquired by the Anglican church, and was rededicated as a new St John the Baptist's Church.
