= RAF Cowden =

Former Royal Air Force bombing range in the East Riding of Yorkshire, England

RAF Cowden
- Great Cowden, East Riding of Yorkshire in England
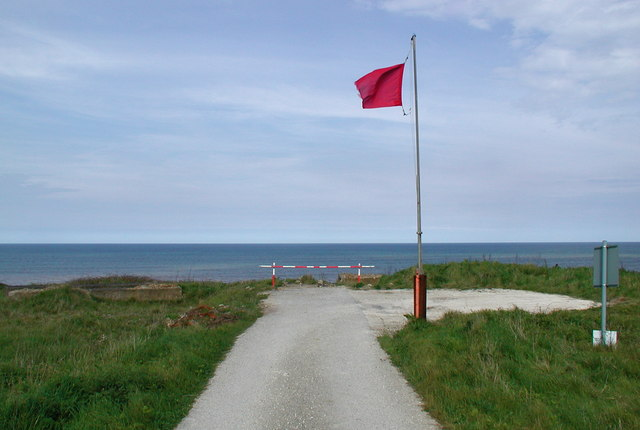
- RAF Cowden Air Weapon Range

Site information
- Type: Bombing range
- Owner: Ministry of Defence
- Operator: Royal Air Force
- Open to the public: Yes, limited by EOD operations

Location
- Location of RAF Cowden
- Coordinates: 53.848°N 0.113°W
- Grid reference: TA241412
- Area: 600 acres (240 ha)

Site history
- Built: 1940
- In use: 1940–c. 1945 army use 1959–1998 air forces use
- Fate: Closed, partly remediated

RAF Cowden was a Royal Air Force bombing range, near to the village of Aldbrough, East Riding of Yorkshire, England. The site was used by the RAF and other air forces between 1959 and 1998, though the land part of the site was used by the army for training in the Second World War. Since closure, explosive ordnance disposal (EOD) teams have had to visit the site on numerous occasions due to erosion of the cliffs by the North Sea revealing old practice bombs.

== History ==
The Yorkshire coast has been home to at least five aerial bombing and gunnery ranges; one during the First World War at RAF Marske, one at Skipsea, which was brought into use in the 1920s, short-lived bombing ranges at North Frodingham and Roos during the Second World War, and the Cold War range at Cowden. Land at Great Cowden was requisitioned in 1940 for Aldbrough RAC tank range, which involved the permanent removal of some residents. The buildings left in the villages of Great and Little Cowden were then destroyed as part of the creation of the range. The range was used extensively for training during the Second World War, becoming abandoned later, but then, in 1953, the War Office purchased over 200 acres (81 ha) of land to develop the range.

The site totalled 600 acres (240 ha), (Note: Sources external to the Ministry of Defence quote 600 acres (240 ha), however, by the MoDs assessment, the size of the range was either 670 acres (272 hectares), or 673.5 acres (272.57 hectares).) and used between 1959 and 1998 as a bombing range by the Royal Air Force and NATO air forces. Cowden was equipped with two target railways, and various static targets on land and on the area of the range out to sea. However, the railway was believed to only have been used for tank training. Pilots would often run south eastwards over RAF Cowden, using Hornsea Mere as a landmark and waypoint to guide them onto the range. The range was equipped with four "reinforced concrete quadrant towers", located at TA232415, TA232414, TA240406, and TA244401. By 1992, only one of the towers was still standing, and was deemed to be at low risk of destruction. However, the rate of erosion at the site was 90 feet (27.4 m) between June 1994 and July 1997.

During the 1980s, the Building Research Establishment, had a test centre for piles at the site. The test bed was into the lowland clay till. Erosion of the cliff edge forced the closure of the site in 1998. As the site is being eroded by the action of the North Sea, the beach is often closed whilst Explosive Ordnance Disposal teams deal with the bombs. The RAF had an EoD team based permanently at the site until 2013, when regular visits were instituted instead.

In April 2001, the site was also investigated as a possible depository of ash from burnt carcasses of cattle who had contracted foot and mouth disease. Also in 2001, claims were made by military veterans and local people that depleted uranium (DU) shells were used by A-10 Tankbuster aircraft on the range. The Ministry of Defence denied this stating that only two locations in the United Kingdom had been used to fire DU; Eskmeals in Cumbria and Kirkcudbright in Scotland. At the same time, there was a desire to convert the site into a nature reserve, which required No. 5131 (BD) Squadron RAF to start a long programme of deactivating and destroying ordnance left at the site.

In February 2021, Brimstone Site Investigation was awarded a £1.5 million contract to clear ordnance from the site over a four-year period. The contract was the first of its kind awarded to a civilian company by the Defence Infrastructure Organisation (DIO). By the May 2021, they had cleared over 10,000 items or ordnance, with an expected 650,000 items still awaiting disposal.

The site is set to be disposed of from 2024.

== Accidents ==
In March 1961, a Hawker Hunter of No. 1 Squadron stalled on an approach run over the range. It crashed into the sea, and the pilot was killed. The airframe (XE604), was written off.

== Names ==
Whilst being used by the Army during the Second World War, the site was known as Aldbrough RAC. When it was being used as an air weapons range, it was known variously as RAF Cowden, RAF Cowden Sands, RAF Great Cowden, RAF Cowden AWR, AWR Cowden, Cowden Air Range, and Cowden Range.
