= No. 5131 (BD) Squadron RAF =

Former bomb disposal squadron of the Royal Air Force

5131 (BD) Squadron
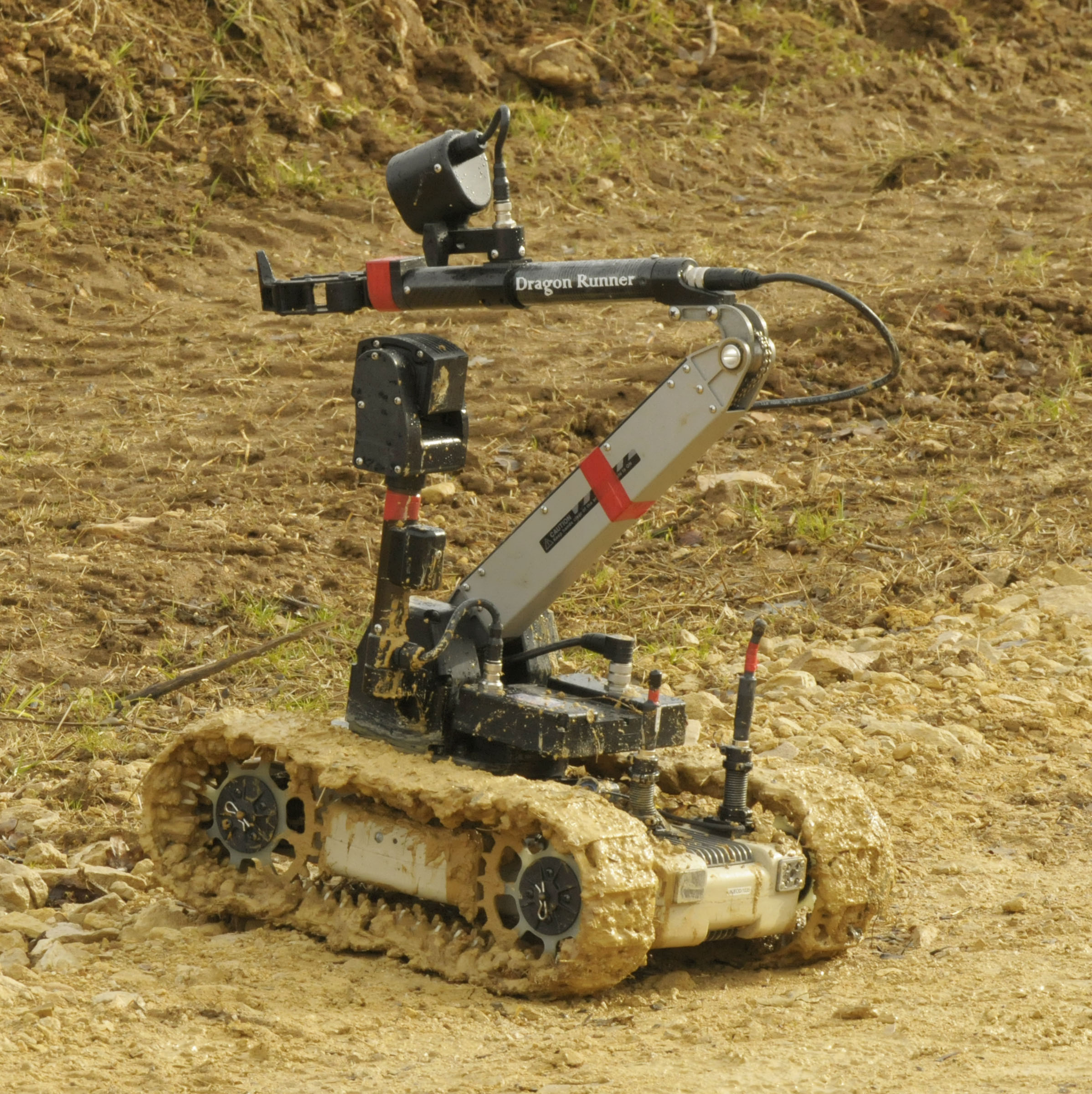
- Dragon Runner Bomb Disposal Robot as used by 5131 (BD) Squadron
- Active: 21 April 1943–31 March 2020
- Country: United Kingdom
- Branch: Royal Air Force
- Type: Bomb disposal
- Role: "To deliver and develop EOD capability to support UK defence policy" (Mission Statement)
- Size: 56
- Part of: No. 42 Expeditionary Support Wing
- Garrison/HQ: RAF Wittering
- Mottos: E Nocentibus Innocentia Latin: (Out of harmful things, harmless things)

No. 5131 (BD) Squadron was an Explosive Ordnance Disposal (EOD) squadron of the Royal Air Force. First formed in 1943, 5131 Bomb Disposal Squadron was the Royal Air Force's explosive ordnance disposal capability for 77 years. Its technicians were trained to deal with conventional munitions, chemical munitions and improvised explosive devices. The Squadron also responded to aircraft crashes; clearing the area of explosive risks and making any ordnance, aircraft assisted escape systems and flare countermeasures safe. During the 77-year operational history of the squadron, it saw action in World War II, the Suez conflict, the Indonesian conflict, the Cyprus invasion, the Falkland Islands war, Kosovo, Bosnia, Iraq, Afghanistan and Northern Ireland as well as Military Assistance to Police taskings in the UK.

The squadron deployed to EOD alerts throughout the United Kingdom and had an additional role to undertake worldwide. No. 5131 Sqn was disbanded during the lockdown at the height of the Coronavirus pandemic in 2020, as the RAF's explosive ordnance disposal (EOD) capability transferred to the Army. Restrictions at the time, however, made a full military parade impossible, and so the decision was made to wait for a more appropriate opportunity. 5131 was the oldest non army UK military EOD team that was qualified to deal with ejection seats, aircraft canopies, and bomb disposal work undertaken in the airfield environment. The squadron latterly operated out of RAF Wittering in Cambridgeshire as an element of No. 42 (Expeditionary Support) Wing (42 ESW).

In November 2018, it was announced that the squadron would be disbanded by 2020 with the work being passed onto the British Army EOD units.

== History ==
The history of the squadron dates back to the early days of the Second World War when four 110-pound (50 kg) bombs were detonated by an RAF bomb disposal team in the Shetland Islands. At that time, there were over 29 bomb disposal squadrons in the RAF with upwards of 870 personnel spread across them. In the Second World War, the RAF looked after airfields and anything that involved ordnance dropped from aircraft (Axis or Allied), the Royal Navy looked after naval ordnance and the rest was taken care of by the Royal Engineers of the British Army. By the end of the war in Europe (VE Day), the RAF bomb disposal branch had dealt with over 176,000 weapons in Britain and Europe. To date, the squadron is the Ministry of Defence's lead unit for the safe disposal of air weapons.

Besides dealing with unexploded ordnance dropped from the air, since the Second World War 5131 were deployed to most of the major theatres that the UK armed forces have been involved in (Falkland Islands, Kosovo, Iraq and Afghanistan). During the beach landings on the 27 May 1982 at San Carlos in the Falklands Conflict, one of the officers of 5131 (BD) Squadron, needed to assess some unexploded ordnance that was lodged in the walls of the field hospital, but had to wait until daylight to do so. To alleviate the worry for the patients who could not be moved to safer medical care, he opted to sleep that night alongside the unexploded ordnance. In the Afghanistan conflict, members of 5131 (BD) Squadron were part of the Joint Force Counter-IED Task Force alongside the British Army bomb disposal experts, although 5131 themselves are keen to point out that it is not their primary task. Counter-IED operations remained the mainstay of the Royal Logistic Corps bomb disposal technicians.

5131 Squadron had a remit to keep two teams on standby readiness to deploy around the United Kingdom to defuse and safely dispose of any conventional air dropped weapons (CMD - Conventional Munitions Disposal). In addition to this, the squadron also had to support the Defence Chemical, Biological, Radiological and Nuclear (CBRN) teams for counter-CBRN operations worldwide. The squadron was also utilised when RAF land was being sold off or disposed of; in this instance they were making sure that the ground is safe and no historical weapons are present. As befits the squadron's heritage and loyalty, it was the only one of the EOD teams that operated in the defence community who were qualified to work on aircraft ejector seats and explosive canopy charges.

In the squadron's 77-year history, they were based at RAF Detling, RAF Doncaster, RAF Rufforth, RAF Stafford, RAF North Luffenham and RAF North Coates. Since June 1995, and their disbandment in 2020, 5131 (BD) were based at RAF Wittering in Cambridgeshire and had responsibility for the disposal of air delivered weapons in the United Kingdom. Between 1970 and 1987, 5131 used Orford Ness as a site to destroy large amounts of munitions. The squadron used a mock village set up in Rogue Sale Wood, which occupies the south-western edge of RAF Wittering where the squadron had its last base.

Staff on the squadron were recruited from the Weapons Technician branch of Trade Group 1 in the Royal Air Force. The squadron was featured on the BBC One Show in August 2011 when presenter Lucy Siegle took part in a bomb disposal exercise.

Personnel assigned to the squadron were allowed to wear the BD patch on the uniform; this differed from the official squadron badge and has a vertically assigned bomb in the middle, surrounded by two sets of laurel leaves and the initials 'BD' upon it.

In November 2018, it was announced that the squadron would disband by 2020 with all EOD work being undertaken by the British Army as it has "more qualified personnel than the RAF, spread over a wider geographical area." The Royal Navy will keep their specialist maritime EOD units and the Metropolitan Police in London will deal with any devices found in their area. However, there still remains RAF Bomb Disposal personnel assigned to DEMS Trg Regt instructing in both Conventional Munitions Disposal (CMD) and Improvised Explosive Device Disposal (IEDD).

== Notable awards ==
RAF bomb disposal technicians have won a total of 43 bravery awards including six George Crosses and eleven George Medals.

- Squadron Leader Wilson Charlton - awarded the George Cross after defusing more than 200 bombs in two months during the Battle of Britain.
- Flight lieutenant Ted Costick - awarded the Queens Gallantry Medal for defusing a 750-pound (340 kg) bomb in a hotel on the seafront at Famagusta, Cyprus, whilst under fire from the Turkish Army and the Cypriot National Guard in July 1974.
- Chief technician Dave Lowe - awarded the Queens Gallantry Medal for defusing IEDs in Afghanistan in 2011. CT Lowe was the first non-RLC technician to pass the IED High Threat Operator's course.
