= Acklam, Ryedale =

Village and civil parish in North Yorkshire, England

Coordinates: 54°02′44″N 0°48′14″W

Acklam
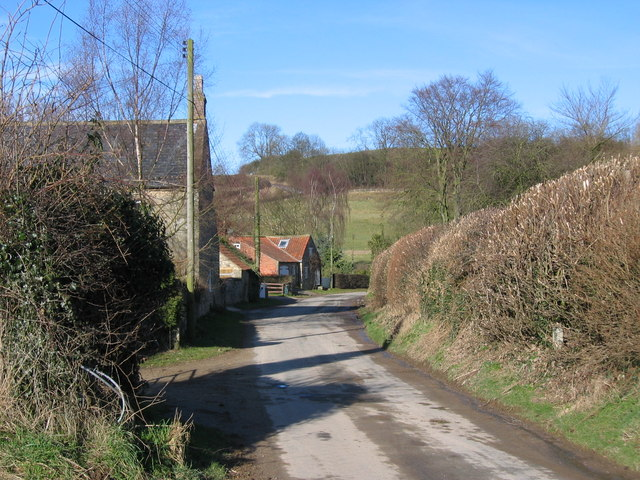
- Village of Acklam

- Location within North Yorkshire
- Population: 168
- OS grid reference: SE784617
  - London: 175 mi (282 km) S
- Civil parish: Acklam
- Unitary authority: North Yorkshire
- Ceremonial county: North Yorkshire
- Region: Yorkshire and the Humber
- Country: England
- Sovereign state: United Kingdom
- Post town: MALTON
- Postcode district: YO17
- Police: North Yorkshire
- Fire: North Yorkshire
- Ambulance: Yorkshire
- UK Parliament: Thirsk and Malton

Acklam is a small village and civil parish in North Yorkshire, England. It is situated approximately 12 miles (20 km) north-east of York city centre and 6 miles (10 km) south of the town of Malton.

== History ==
Acklam is mentioned in the Domesday Book as Aclum in the East Riding and gave its name to the Hundred. The Lord in 1066 was named as Siward and comprised 4 ploughlands with 2 Lord's plough teams and a church. The village lay within the ancient Wapentake of Buckrose.

The village was a part of the East Riding of Yorkshire until 1974. Between 1974 and 2023 it was in the Ryedale district.

The etymology of the name is derived from Old English āc (an oak tree) and lēah (a forest or wood clearing).

There are the remains of an earthwork motte and bailey castle on a ridge overlooking the village to the south.

== Governance ==
The village lies within the Westminster Parliamentary Constituency of Thirsk and Malton and the Sheriff Hutton and Derwent Electoral Division of North Yorkshire Council.

== Demographics ==
According to the 2001 UK census, Acklam parish had a population of 183, reducing to 168 at the 2011 Census. The 2011 census also showed that there were 72 dwellings in the Parish.

Historical population

| Year | Pop. | ±% |
|---|---|---|
| 1801 | 431 | — |
| 1811 | 535 | +24.1% |
| 1821 | 683 | +27.7% |
| 1831 | 725 | +6.1% |
| 1841 | 845 | +16.6% |
| 1851 | 781 | −7.6% |
| 1861 | n/a | — |
| 1871 | n/a | — |
| 1881 | 287 | — |

| Year | Pop. | ±% |
|---|---|---|
| 1891 | 282 | −1.7% |
| 1901 | 223 | −20.9% |
| 1911 | 206 | −7.6% |
| 1921 | 168 | −18.4% |
| 1931 | 181 | +7.7% |
| 1941 | no census | — |
| 1951 | 158 | — |
| 1961 | 145 | −8.2% |

Source: A Vision of Britain

== Community ==
There is no school in the village, but it is within the catchment area for Leavening Community Primary School one mile north of the village and the catchment area of Norton College for Secondary Education. The village is served by a District Council assisted service once per day.

== Religion ==
St John the Baptist's Church, Acklam is part of the united Parish of West Buckrose in the Deanery of Southern Ryedale along with eight other churches. The church is housed in what used to be the Wesleyan Methodist Chapel, built in 1794 after the Anglican Church was demolished.

== See also ==
- Listed buildings in Acklam, Ryedale
