= Ivy House, Hedon =

House in Hedon, East Riding of Yorkshire, England

Coordinates: 53°44′33″N 0°12′04″W

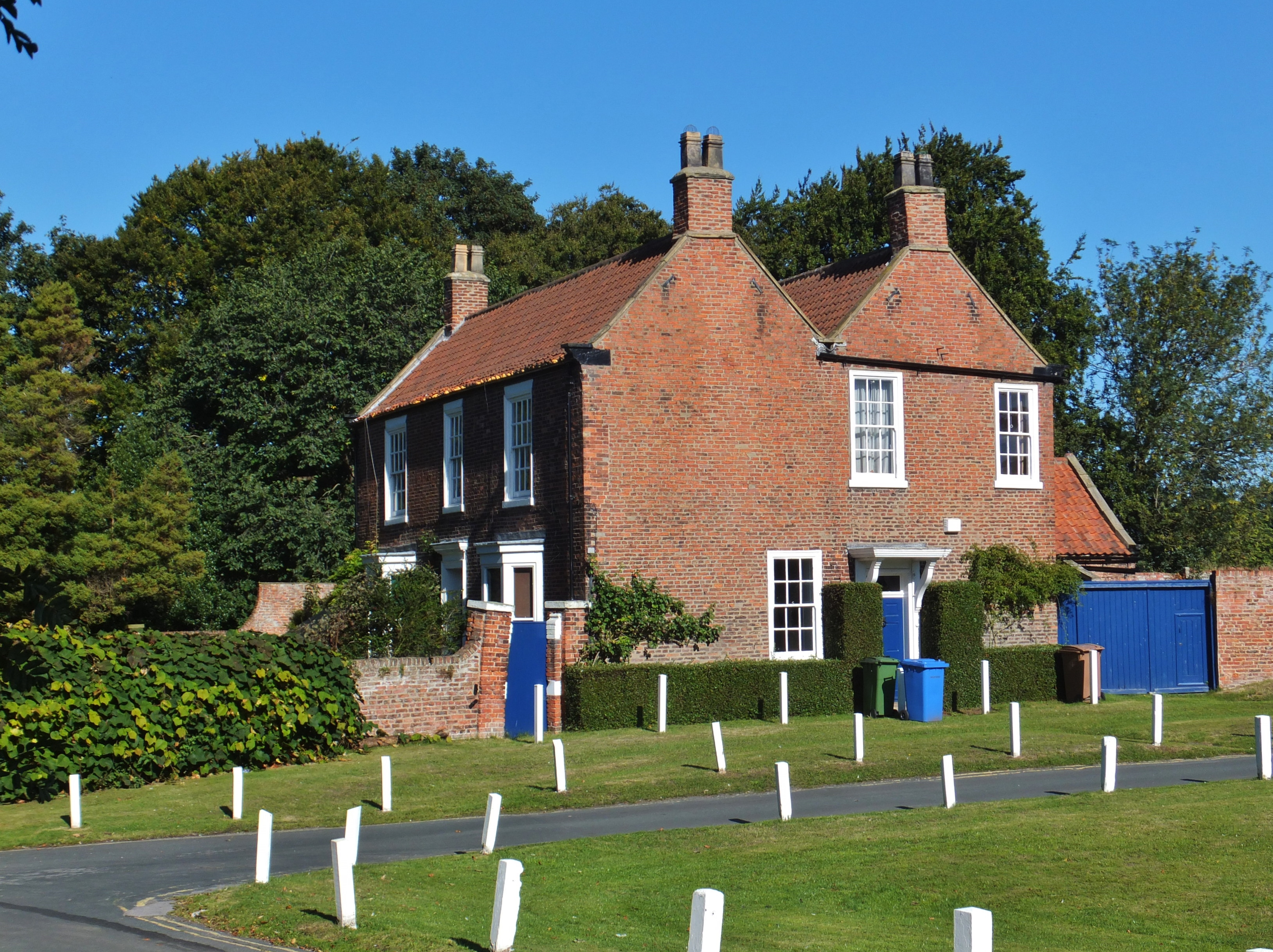
The building, in 2013

Ivy House is a historic building in Hedon, a town in the East Riding of Yorkshire, in England. It is best known for the collection of mediaeval stonework in its garden.

== History ==
The house was probably built in 1807, for James Iveson. Iveson collected a range of stonework, mostly mediaeval and taken from churches in the East Riding. He displayed these in his garden, most on their own, but assembled some into a chapel-like structure, which he named "Albina's Tomb". This was inspired by Albina, wife of Drogo de la Beuvrière, who was generally believed to have been murdered by her husband. Iveson wrote an imagined history of the site, claiming that he had discovered a dungeon on the site, containing a historic glass vessel and bones.

In the 20th century, part of the grounds of Ivy House were divided and a new house, Windyridge, constructed in them. The stonework has since been in the grounds of both properties. The two collections of stonework were separately grade II listed in 1979, while Ivy House has been grade II listed since 1978.

== House ==
The house is built of brown brick, and has a pantile roof with coped gables and shaped stone kneelers. It has two storeys, a double depth plan, a front range of three bays, and a single-storey rear wing. The central doorway has a moulded surround, a dentilled transom, a rectangular fanlight, and a modillion cornice. This is flanked by canted bay windows, and the upper floor contains sash windows. Inside, the original staircase survives, as do two marble fireplaces.

== Garden of Ivy House ==
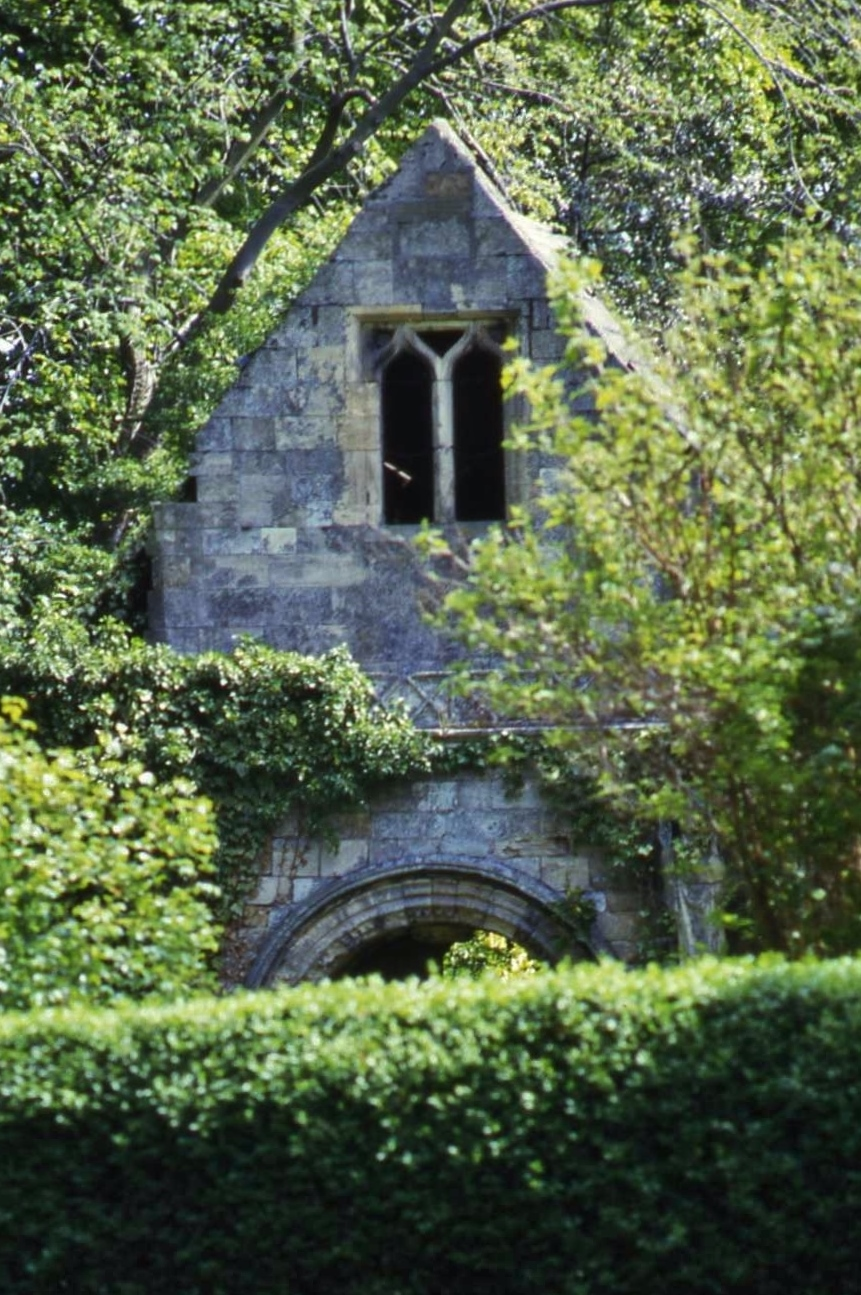
Albina's Tomb

The medieval fragments were collected from various places. They include 13th- and 14th-century piers, two of which may come from St Giles' Church, Marfleet; an arcade constructed of elaborately moulded stonework which may come from the old St Helen's Church, Kilnsea; a 15th-century arcade, probably from the west front of St Augustine's Church, Hedon; an archway, believed to be from St Nicholas' Church, Hollym; a doorway, reconstructed from elements of the west door of Hull Minster; and a tomb, said to have been built in imitation of the Percy Tomb at Beverley Minster.

Albina's Tomb, a small summer house, is the most complex structure. It is built from various stone fragments which are most likely to have come from Kilnsea. It has a moulded cornice and a parapet dating to the 14th or 15th century, and a gable with a two-light window. There is a round-arched door dating from around 1200, flanked by 13th-century statues of a bishop and a king. Inside, there is a spiral staircase leading up to the parapet.

== Garden of Windyridge ==
The medieval fragments consist of two arches, probably from St Margaret's Church, Hilston and Kilnsea; a pier, perhaps from Kilnsea; an octagonal font, probably 15th century but recarved in the 19th century; jambs and a lintel of a door, supposedly from St Nicholas' Church, Keyingham; two capitals, brought from a bank in Kingston upon Hull; a basin with a 13th-century base; and a grotesque head. Dating from the 18th century are an octagonal vase-shaped font, and a vase-shaped sundial with a gadrooned top and a copper dial.

== See also ==
- Listed buildings in Hedon
