= Ravenspurn Cross =

Stone cross in Hedon, East Riding of Yorkshire, England

Coordinates: 53°44′29″N 0°11′48″W

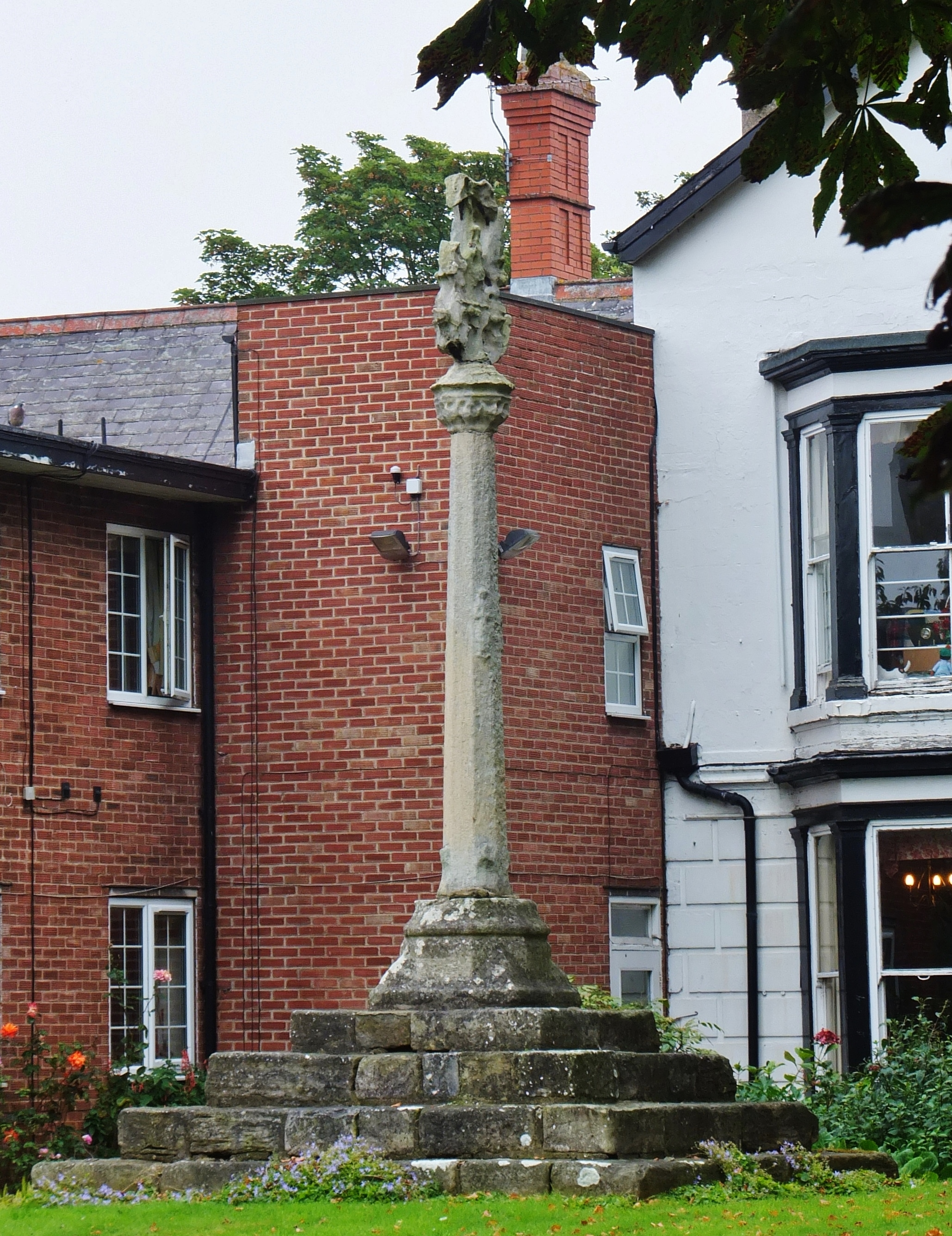
The cross, in 2014

Ravenspurn Cross, also known as Kilnsea Cross, is a historic structure in Hedon, a town in the East Riding of Yorkshire, in England.

The cross was erected in the early 15th century in Ravenspurn, probably to commemorate the 1399 landing of the future Henry IV of England in the town. The town suffered serious erosion from the Humber Estuary, and in the early 16th century, the cross was relocated to the village green in Kilnsea. Kilnsea also suffered erosion, and by 1816 the cross was atop a cliff. It was then moved to Burton Constable. The agent of the Constable family, James Iveson, was planning to construct a new housing development in Hedon, and received permission to move the cross there. Although the development did not take place, the cross was moved in 1821 to the grounds of Holyrood House in the town, where it remains. The cross has been a grade II* listed building since 1991, and is also a scheduled monument.

The standing cross is carved from stone and is about 3 metres (9.8 ft) in height. The cross has a square four-step plinth, around 3 metres (9.8 ft) wide and an octagonal base, about 75 centimetres (30 in) square and 70 centimetres (28 in) high. Atop this is an octagonal cross shaft with a decorated capital. This is surmounted by an elaborate carved cross decorated with figures, but badly eroded.

== See also ==
- Grade II* listed buildings in the East Riding of Yorkshire
- Listed buildings in Hedon
