= Amy Black (mezzo-soprano) =

British opera singer

Amy Black (17 September 1973 – 24 November 2009) was a British mezzo-soprano opera singer of international repute.

She was born in Hedon, in the East Riding of Yorkshire, and trained at the Royal Academy of Music. She made numerous appearances at the popular Classics in the Park event, held at Brantingham, and also sang for Glyndebourne Opera, English Touring Opera, The European Union Opera, Wexford Festival Opera and English National Opera.

In 2009, she gave a personal performance for Plácido Domingo in Qatar and in 2002, she gave a solo recital at the British Embassy in Asunción, Paraguay to celebrate the Queen's Golden Jubilee.

Tests earlier in 2009 had revealed that Amy had a bicuspid aortic heart valve, meaning the valve that pumps blood away from the heart has only two valve leaflets instead of the usual three. She could not sing for three months after her surgery, but made a comeback in October with an emotional performance at Toll Gavel Methodist Church in Beverley.

She died on 24 November 2009. She was 36 years old and had undergone heart surgery five months earlier. She never forgot her home town, helping to raise thousands of pounds for St Augustine's Church, Hedon, where she had sung in the choir as a girl.

Hundreds of mourners packed into St Augustine's Church for her funeral on 7 December 2009. Amy's fellow musicians from the English National Opera attended the service and sang a piece from Mozart's Idomeneo, which Black had been due to perform in 2010.
