= St Mary and St Joseph's Church, Hedon =

Catholic church in Hedon, East Riding of Yorkshire, England

Coordinates: 53°44′25″N 0°11′48″W

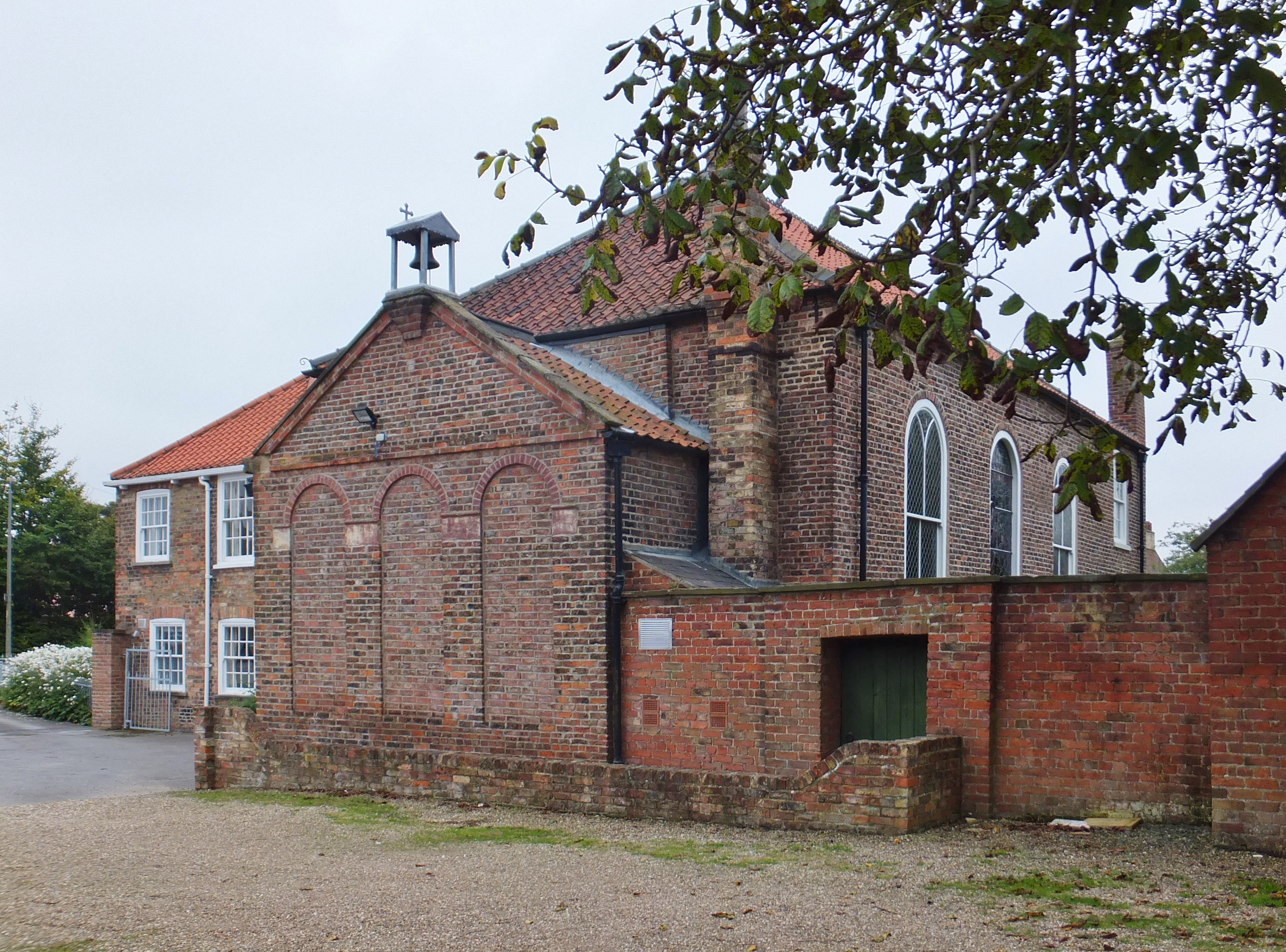
The church, in 2022

St Mary and St Joseph's Church is a Catholic church in Hedon, a town in the East Riding of Yorkshire, in England.

A hidden Catholic chapel was established at Nuthill Farm in Burstwick in 1774. Following the Catholic Relief Act 1778, a mission was established in the nearby town of Hedon, and in 1803 a church was constructed on Grape Lane in the town. The church was restored in the late 19th century, the work focusing on internal alterations. In the 1980s, most of these were undone, returning the interior to a Georgian appearance. The building has been grade II* listed since 1954.

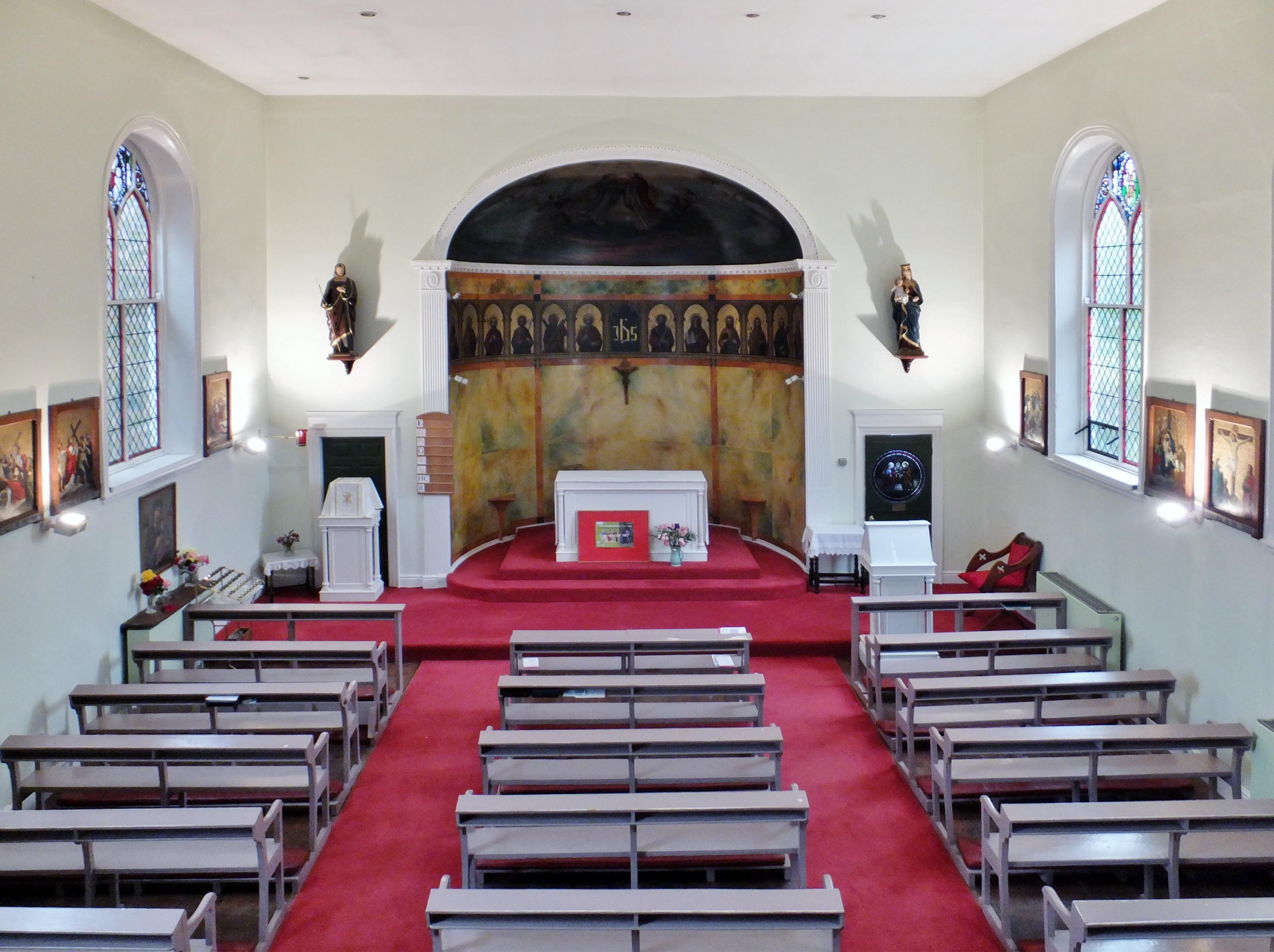
View east from the balcony

The church is built of brown brick with a pantile roof, and a small timber bellcote. It has a rectangular plan with an apse at each end. On the sides are tall round-arched windows, and at the north end is a lower block with three blind round-arched recesses. The windows have stained glass in the pre-Raphaelite style, dating from 1892. Inside, the liturgical west end has a balcony with a carved and panelled front over the porch. It is accessed by the original staircase. At the west end is an ornate Victorian font.

== See also ==
- Grade II* listed buildings in the East Riding of Yorkshire
- Listed buildings in Hedon
