= The Station, Hedon =

Pub in Hedon, East Riding of Yorkshire, England

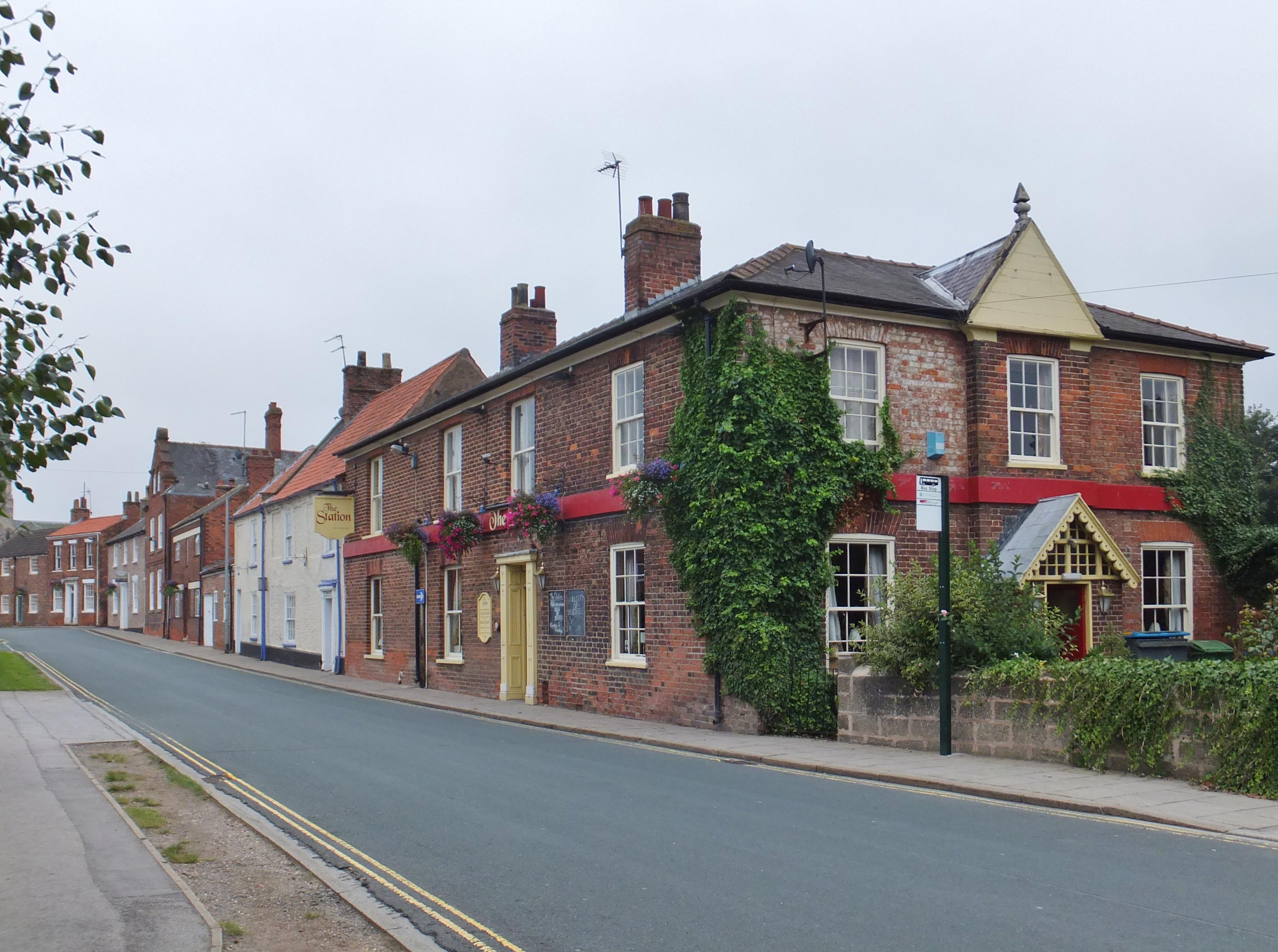
The pub, in 2013

The Station is a historic pub in Hedon, a town in the East Riding of Yorkshire, in England.

The pub was built on Souttergate in the early or mid 19th century. It was variously named the "Governors House", "The Sun" and the "Durham Ox". It became the "Station Hotel" in 1880, named for the nearby Hedon railway station. The building was grade II listed in 1979. The pub closed in 2019, but was renovated at a cost of £340,000 and reopened in 2023, at which time it was run by Star Pubs & Bars. The work included improvements to the beer garden. Following the refurbishment, the pub had two bars: the tap room focused on real ale, and the other serving traditional food alongside drinks.

The pub is built of brown brick, with a floor band, and a hipped slate roof. It has two storeys and a front of four bays. The doorway on the front has panelled pilasters and reveals, and a rectangular fanlight. The right return has three bays, the middle bay is gabled and has a blocked oculus, a finial, and a gabled porch. The windows on both fronts are sashes.

== See also ==
- Listed buildings in Hedon
