= New Hall, Hedon =

Building in Hedon, East Riding of Yorkshire, England

Coordinates: 53°44′22″N 0°11′54″W

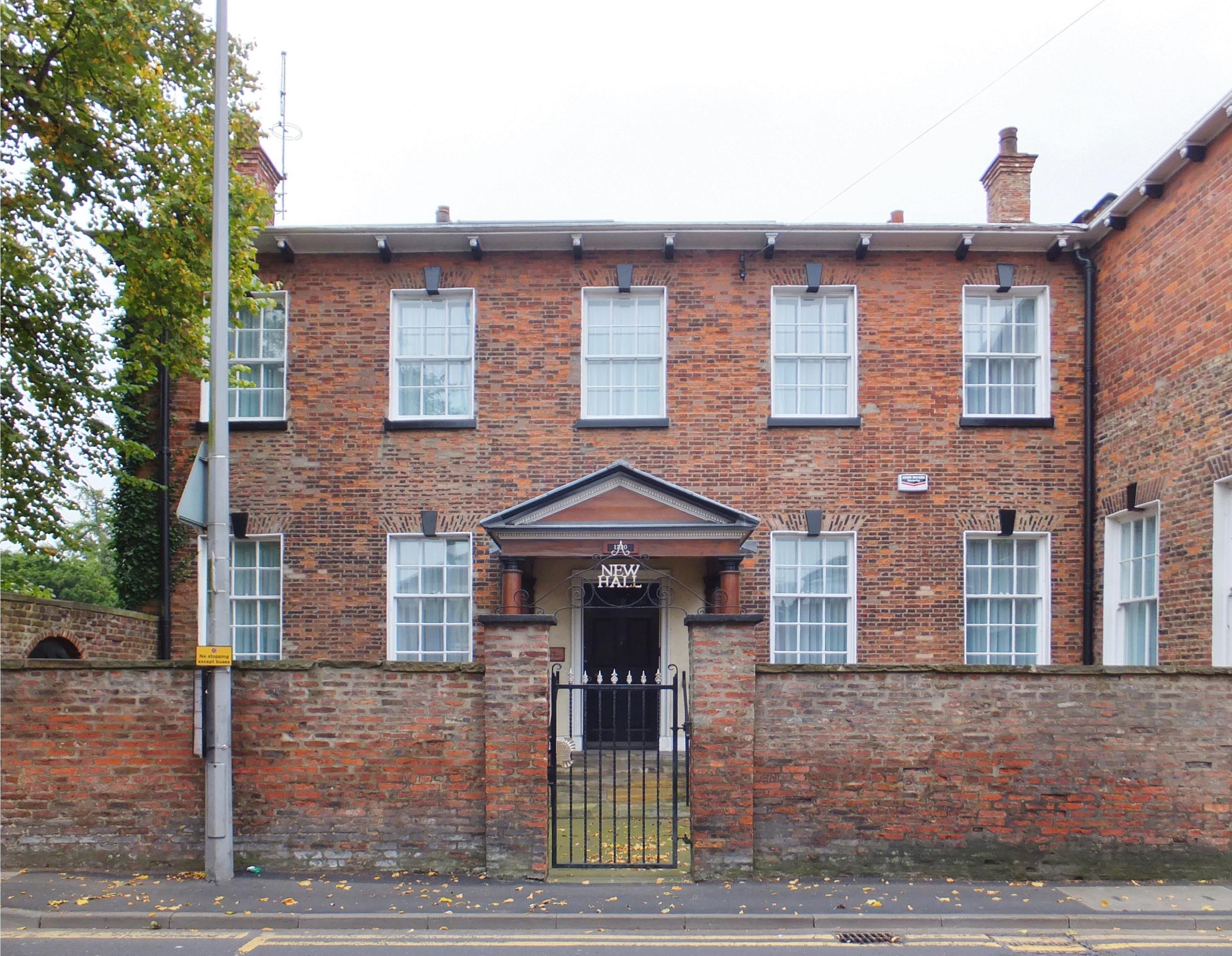
The building, in 2013

New Hall is a historic building in Hedon, a town in the East Riding of Yorkshire, in England.

The house was constructed on Fletcher Gate between 1730 and 1742for Jacob Dawson, the town clerk. A conservatory was added at the rear in the mid-19th century, and in the 20th century, the north wing was heightened. The building was grade II* listed in 1954.

The house is built of brown brick, and has a slate roof with overhanging eaves on long moulded brackets at the front, and a pantile roof at the rear. It has two storeys, a double depth plan, and a front range of five bays. In the centre is a porch on two Tuscan columns and half-columns, with an entablature and a dentilled pediment, and a doorway with a moulded surround. The windows are sashes with keystones. To the right is a projecting two-storey two-bay gabled wing with an oculus in the gable. At the rear is a brick parapet with stone coping, and a porch with reeded pilasters and a pedimented gable. Inside, many original features survive, including the main staircase, woodwork, plasterwork and tiling.

== See also ==
- Grade II* listed buildings in the East Riding of Yorkshire
- Listed buildings in Hedon
