= Church of St Helen, Kilnsea =

Church in the East Riding of Yorkshire, England

Coordinates: 53.619736°N 0.131785°E

St Helen's Church
- Church of St Helen
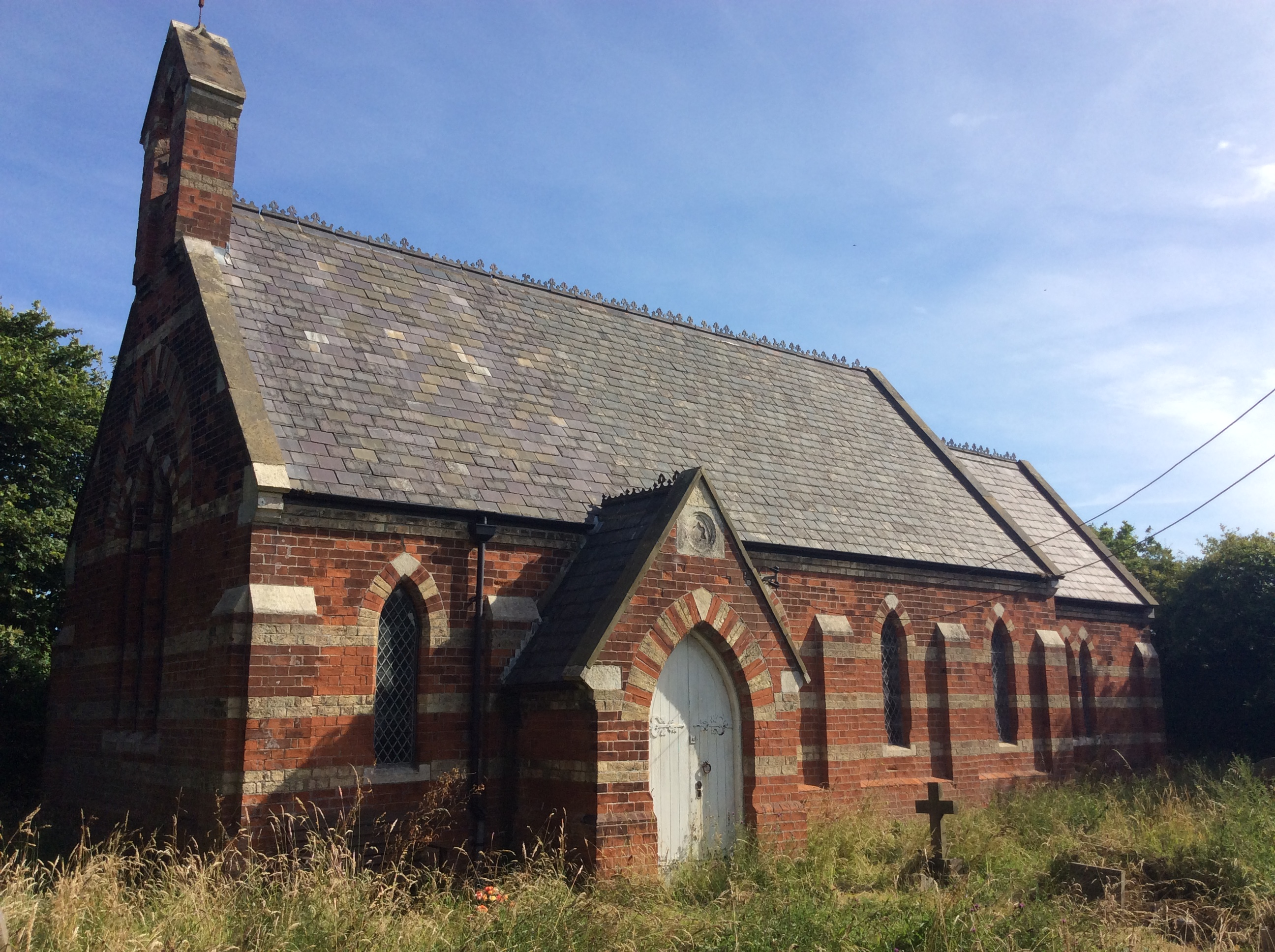

- Location within East Riding of Yorkshire
- OS grid reference: TA 41109 15830
- Location: Kilnsea, Holderness, East Riding of Yorkshire
- Country: England

History
- Founded: 1864–5

Architecture
- Functional status: Redundant
- Heritage designation: Grade II
- Designated: 14 December 2018
- Architect: William Burges
- Architectural type: Church

The Church of St Helen, Kilnsea, Holderness, East Riding of Yorkshire, England, is a redundant parish church dating from 1864–5. It was designed by the architect William Burges, and partly paid for by his father Alfred Burges, and is a Grade II listed building.

== History ==
The hamlet of Kilnsea lies in the parish of Easington, almost at the tip of Spurn Head, in the East Riding of Yorkshire. The hamlet has always been prone to sea erosion and the original church of St Helen fell into the sea in 1826-31. (Note: The topographer Thomas Allen, in his New and Complete History of the County of York, gives a slightly earlier date for the collapse of the nave and chancel, of 1826, when just the tower was left standing. This is supported by an entry in the parish register which reads "Mem. 1826 August 3: The church of Kilnsea fell down the cliff into the sea and divine service was from that time held in the house of Robert Medforth Senr, the marriages and burials were performed in the parish of Easington." [Medforth was churchwarden]) Some thirty years later, on 22 April 1865, the Yorkshire Gazette recorded; "the great liberality of Mr. A. Burgess C.E., of Blackheath, who having occasionally passed (Kilnsea) on his professional visits to Spurn Point and struck with the poverty of the place, having heard that an effort was being made for building a church, most kindly offered plans free of all expense, and gave £150 towards its completion". Pevsner notes that the plans were drawn up by Alfred Burges's two sons, "one of whom was the architect William Burges". The purpose of Alfred Burges's "professional visits" to Spurn Point is unclear, but his partner in the engineering firm of Messrs. Walker and Burgess, James Walker, was Chief Engineer for Trinity House, the body with responsibility, then and now, for lighthouse construction in Great Britain. In the 1850s, Trinity House funded the construction of a new lighthouse at Spurn Point, the Low Lighthouse.

The total cost of the new church was £420. The church was declared redundant in 1993 due to falling congregations, the last service being held on 20 June of that year. It was subsequently sold, with the intention of conversion to a private house.

== Architecture and description ==
The church is simple and small, comprising a chancel, nave and bellcote. It is constructed of red and yellow brick and incorporates some material from the earlier church. These included the original font, returned from nearby Skeffling. A tablet, commemorating two men from the village who were killed in the First World War, was removed when the church was decommissioned and is now located at All Saints', Easington. Graves of two unknown merchant seamen also killed in the war are located in the graveyard.

Relatively unknown, the church is not recorded in the gazetteer of Burges's known buildings compiled by the architectural historian J. Mordaunt Crook, and included as Appendix B in his study of Burges, William Burges and the High Victorian Dream. It is noted by David Neave in his revised Pevsner Yorkshire: York and the East Riding and was listed as a Grade II building on 14 December 2018.

== See also ==
- Listed buildings in Easington, East Riding of Yorkshire

== Sources ==
- Allen, Thomas (1831). A New and Complete History of the County of York. Yorkshire: I. T. Hinton. OCLC 820525405. "st helens kilnsea."
- Crook, J. Mordaunt (2013). William Burges and the High Victorian Dream. London: Frances Lincoln. ISBN 978-0-7112-3349-2.
- Pevsner, Nikolaus; Neave, David (2005). Yorkshire: York and the East Riding. The Buildings of England. New Haven and London: Yale University Press. ISBN 0-300-09593-7.
