= Listed buildings in Easington, East Riding of Yorkshire =

Easington is a civil parish in the county of the East Riding of Yorkshire, England. It contains ten listed buildings that are recorded in the National Heritage List for England. Of these, one is listed at Grade I, the highest of the three grades, one is at Grade II*, the middle grade, and the others are at Grade II, the lowest grade. The parish contains the village of Easington, the hamlet of Kilnsea and the surrounding area. The listed buildings consist of two churches, a cross base, two farmhouses, a thatched barn, the remaining parts of two lighthouses, a fort in the Humber estuary, and an acoustic mirror.

== Key ==
Grade	Criteria
I	Buildings of exceptional interest, sometimes considered to be internationally important
II*	Particularly important buildings of more than special interest
II	Buildings of national importance and special interest

== Buildings ==
Name and location	Photograph	Date	Notes	Grade
All Saints' Church; 53.65033°N 0.11497°E		12th century	The church has been altered and extended through the centuries. It is built in limestone, sandstone, cobbles and brick, the body of the church has a lead roof and there is a pantile roof on the porch. The church consists of a nave with a clerestory, north and south aisles, a south porch, a chancel and a west tower. The tower has three stages, a moulded plinth, diagonal buttresses, string courses, and a three-light pointed west window with a hood mould, above which are small single-light windows, two-light traceried bell openings with hood moulds, and a coped embattled parapet. There is also an embattled parapet on the nave. The north door dates from the 12th or 13th century, and is round-headed with three shafted orders.	I
Cross base, All Saints' Church; 53.65018°N 0.11502°E	—	14th or 15th century	The cross base in the churchyard to the south of the church is in stone, and is about 0.5 metres (1 ft 8 in) in height. It consists of a moulded octagonal drum pedestal with broach stops and a square base, and a square socket for a cross shaft.	II
Tithe Barn; 53.64992°N 0.11415°E		Late 15th or early 16th century	The threshing barn is timber framed, with brick walls and a hipped thatched roof. It is aisled and has five internal bays, and contains wagon entrances and slit vents. Adjoining is a late 18th-century horse barn in brick with a pantile roof. It is hexagonal, and has stone-coped brick piers with later infilling.	II*
Rectory Farmhouse; 53.65040°N 0.11425°E	—	Mid to late 18th century	The farmhouse is in rendered brick, with a cogged brick eaves cornice, and a pantile roof with tumbled-in brick to the raised gables. There are two storeys and attics, and an L-shaped plan, with a front range of three bays. Steps lead up to the doorway that has an architrave, a three-light fanlight, and a stone hood on brackets with roundels. There is one casement window, and the other windows are sashes in architraves.	II
Thompsons Farmhouse; 53.65040°N 0.11682°E		Mid to late 18th century	The farmhouse is in red brick, with a cogged brick eaves cornice, and a pantile roof with tumbled-in brick to the raised gables. There are two storeys, three bays, and a rear wing with outshuts in the angles. The central doorway has an architrave, a three-light fanlight, and a rubbed-brick flat arch with a keystone. The windows are sashes, on the ground floor with flat stucco arches, and on the upper floor with rubbed-brick flat arches and keystones.	II
Tower of former Low Lighthouse; 53.57904°N 0.11602°E		1852	The tower of the former lighthouse is in brick with stone facing. It consists of a tapered round tower with four storeys, and is surmounted by a water tank. The tower has a stepped base about 4 metres (13 ft) in height, and a short projecting timber platform leading to a square-headed entrance with a quoined surround. The windows are blocked and have eared and shouldered surrounds, there is a coved cornice, and the cylindrical water tank is surrounded by railings.	II
Church of St Helen, Kilnsea; 53.62002°N 0.13190°E		1864–65	The church, which is now redundant and converted for residential use, was designed by William Burges. It is built in red brick, with bands of white brick, limestone dressings and a Westmorland slate roof. The church consists of a nave with a south porch, and a chancel with a north vestry. On the west end is a bellcote with an iron cruciform finial. The windows are lancets with pointed polychrome heads and keystones.	II
Spurn Lighthouse; 53.57900°N 0.11827°E		1895	The lighthouse, designed by Thomas Matthews, is in painted brick on a concrete base. It consists of a tapering round tower about 36 metres (118 ft) in height, on a high chamfered plinth, and is surmounted by a cylindrical lantern with a domed cupola. Steps lead up to a doorway on the west side with a segmental head, above which is a painted panel with a coat of arms and a motto, and recessed windows with segmental heads. The top section is corbelled out and surrounded by a platform with a railing.	II
Bull Sand Fort; 53.56330°N 0.05449°E		1915–18	The fort in the Humber estuary is in reinforced concrete and brick, it has riveted steel armour plating, and a jetty in timber and steel. There is a circular plan on an octagonal base, and a balcony at sea level. The fort has three storeys, and a basement and magazine below sea level, and a central two-storey observation tower.	II
Acoustic mirror 53.62734°N 0.13162°E		c. 1916	The acoustic mirror is in concrete, and has a rectangular plan and a chamfered top. The sloping east face contains a shallow dish 15 feet (4.6 m) across, and in front is a concrete plinth containing a metal tube for microphone mounting.	II
