= Easington Tithe Barn =

Building in Easington, East Riding of Yorkshire, England

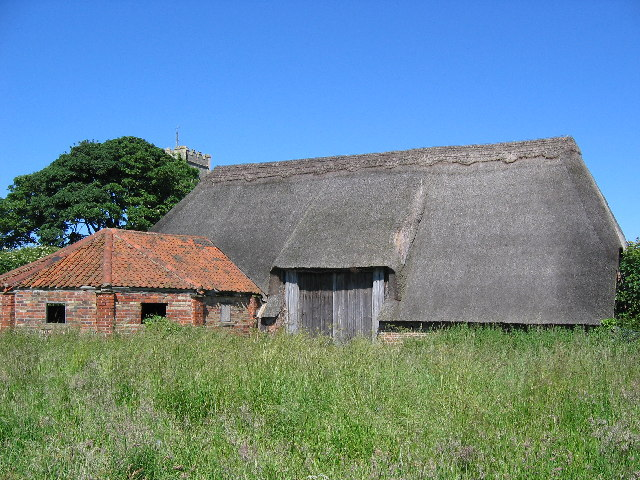
The building, in 2005

Easington Tithe Barn is a historic building in Easington, East Riding of Yorkshire, a village in England.

The tithe barn was around 1500, to serve as a threshing barn. The walls were later rebuilt. In the 19th century, an extension was constructed as a horse mill. The south gable was rebuilt in 1985 and 1986. The building was long owned by the Ecclesiastical Commissioners, but in 1929, they sold the barn and it was converted into a folk museum. This closed during World War II and did not reopen. The building has been grade II* listed since 1987, and is also a scheduled monument. Historic England describe is as "a rare survival with framing largely intact".

The barn is timber framed, with brick walls and a hipped thatched roof. It is aisled and has five internal bays, and contains wagon entrances and slit vents. Adjoining is a late 18th-century horse barn in brick with a pantile roof. It is hexagonal, and has stone-coped brick piers with later infilling.

== See also ==
- Grade II* listed buildings in the East Riding of Yorkshire
- Listed buildings in Easington, East Riding of Yorkshire
