= All Saints' Church, Easington =

Church in Easington, East Riding of Yorkshire, England

Coordinates: 53°39′01″N 0°06′54″E

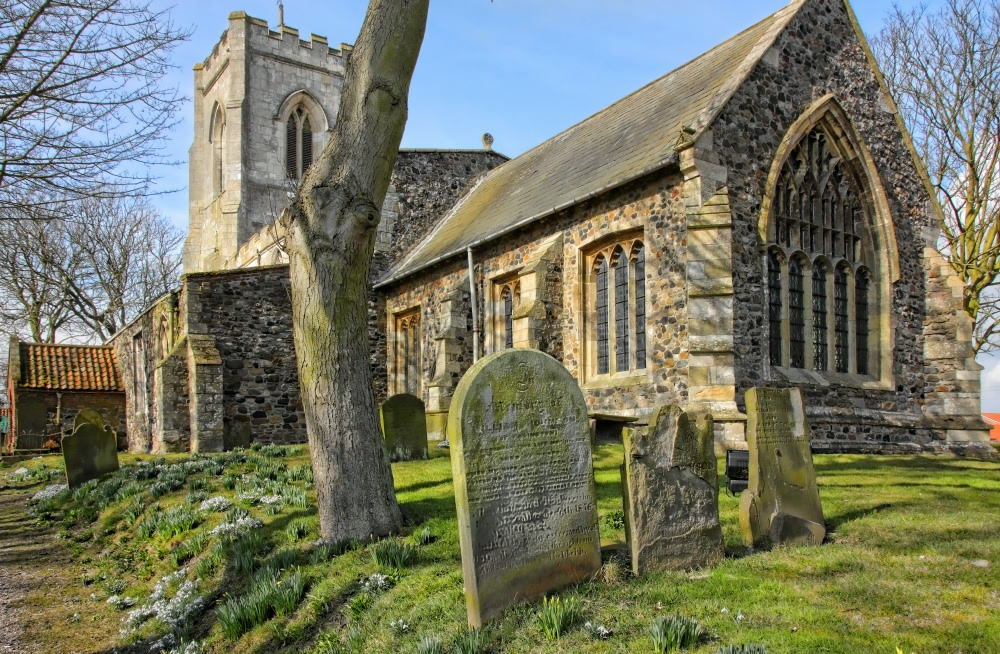
The church, in 2010

All Saints' Church is the parish church of Easington, East Riding of Yorkshire, a village in England.

A church in Easington was first recorded in 1115. The nave survives from the 12th century, while the north aisle was added around 1200, followed by the south aisle later in the 13th century. The tower was built in the 14th century, and the clerestory later in the century. Around 1500, the chancel was rebuilt, along with the north aisle windows, part of the south aisle, and the top section of the tower. The porch was rebuilt around 1720, and was repaired in 1811. The chancel was restored in 1860, with the nave and aisles being restored in 1890. The building was grade I listed in 1966.

The church is built of limestone, sandstone, cobbles and brick, the body of the church has a lead roof and there is a pantile roof on the porch. It consists of a nave with a clerestory, north and south aisles, a south porch, a chancel and a west tower. The tower has three stages, a moulded plinth, diagonal buttresses, string courses, and a three-light pointed west window with a hood mould, above which are small single-light windows, two-light traceried bell openings with hood moulds, and a coped embattled parapet. There is also an embattled parapet on the nave. The north door dates from the 12th or 13th century, and is round-headed with three shafted orders. Inside, there is a 12th-century piscina, freestanding on a pillar, which was discovered built into a wall in the 1860s. There is also an octagonal 14th-century font, an aumbry and built-in piscina in the south aisle, and monuments including one in marble to John and Joan Overton, which was completed in 1651.

== See also ==
- Grade I listed buildings in the East Riding of Yorkshire
- Listed buildings in Easington, East Riding of Yorkshire
