= Listed buildings in Hollym, East Riding of Yorkshire =

Hollym is a civil parish in the county of the East Riding of Yorkshire, England. It contains three listed buildings that are recorded in the National Heritage List for England. All the listed buildings are designated at Grade II, the lowest of the three grades, which is applied to "buildings of national importance and special interest". The parish contains the village of Hollym and the surrounding area. All the listed buildings are in the village, and consist of a church, a gravestone in the churchyard, and a pinfold.

== Buildings ==
Name and location	Photograph	Date	Notes
Gravestone; 53.70611°N 0.03504°E		1743	The gravestone in the churchyard of St Nicholas' Church, to the southwest of the church, is in sandstone, and is to the memory of Mary Tock and her children. It has a shaped head, with relief carving depicting a cherub's head in the centre, flanked by flowers bearing cherub's heads.
Pinfold; 53.70578°N 0.03820°E	—	18th century or earlier	The pinfold is built in cobbles, it has a circular plan, a diameter of about 10 metres (33 ft), and walls about 1 metre (3 ft 3 in) in height. There is an entrance on the street side.
St Nicholas' Church; 53.70630°N 0.03565°E		1814	The oldest part of the church is the tower, and the rest of the church was rebuilt in 1884. The tower is in grey brick, the rest of the church is in yellow brick, with dressings in stone and red brick, and a Westmorland slate roof with crested ridge tiles. The church consists of a nave, a chancel with a south vestry, and a west tower. The tower has three stages, and a round-arched west entrance with a radial fanlight and an inscribed keystone. Above it is a stone string course, a brick band, round-arched bell openings with louvres and Y-tracery, a stepped and dentilled brick cornice, and a coped parapet with plain corner pinnacles.
