= Hedon Town Hall =

Municipal building in Hedon, East Riding of Yorkshire, England

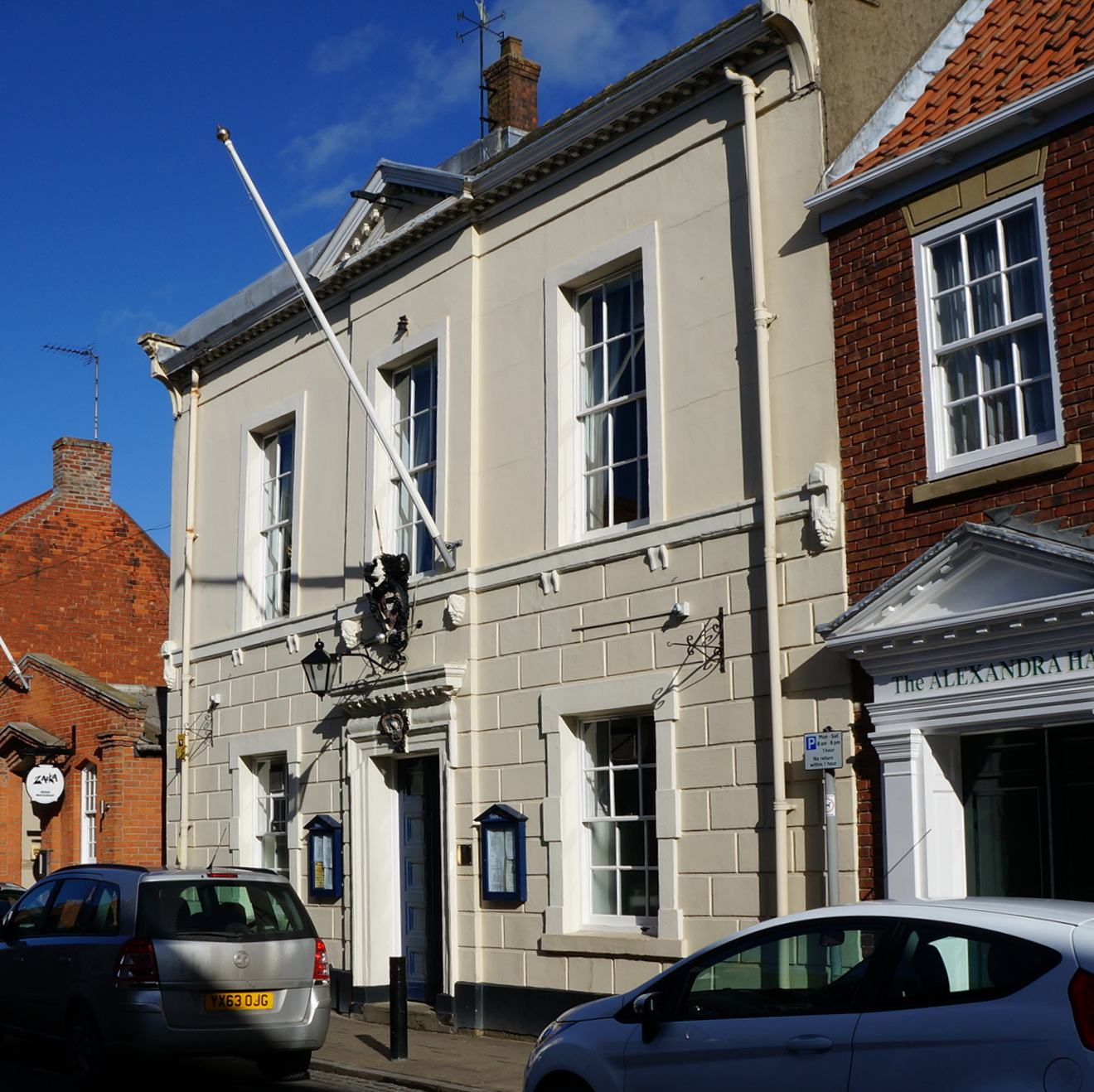
- Hedon Town Hall

- Shown in the East Riding of Yorkshire
- 53.7406°N 0.1987°W
- Location: St Augustine's Gate, Hedon

History
- Built: 1693

Site notes
- Architectural style: Neoclassical style

Listed Building – Grade II*
- Official name: Hedon Town Hall, St Augustine's Gate
- Designated: 9 January 1954
- Reference no.: 1083554

Hedon Town Hall is a municipal building in St Augustine's Gate, Hedon, East Riding of Yorkshire, England. The building, which is the meeting place of Hedon Town Council, is a Grade II* listed building.

== History ==
The council's fine silver collection was established when a member of parliament, John Alured, presented the council with a silver tankard in appreciation of the help he had received from the council in supporting his election to parliament in 1640. The collection was supplemented by further gifts from members of parliament: a wine bowl from Colonel Matthew Alured in 1659, a large silver flagon from Sir Charles Duncombe in 1685 and a silver tankard from Matthew Appleyard in 1689. Another member of parliament and secretary to the Treasury, Henry Guy, presented an early 15th century silver mace, and it was in this context that, in the early 1690s, Guy decided to commission a town hall and present it to the town.

The building was designed in the neoclassical style, built in red brick and was completed in 1693. The design involved a symmetrical main frontage with three bays facing onto St Augustine's Gate; the central bay, which slightly projected forward, featured a doorway with an architrave and a cornice on the ground floor, a sash window on the first floor and a small modillioned pediment above. The outer bays were fenestrated with sash windows on both floors and featured a modillioned cornice above. Internally, the principal room was the courtroom which was also used as a council chamber; there was also a lock-up for incarcerating petty criminals. The magistrates' bench was curved so that attention was focused on all the members of the bench and not just the chief magistrate. Petty session hearings were held in the courtroom once a month.

Hedon had a very small electorate and, in the early 19th century, it was alleged that the council had been receiving corrupt gifts, i.e. silver, from politicians for supporting their election to parliament, which meant the town was recognised by the UK Parliament as a rotten borough. Its right to elect members of parliament was removed by the Reform Act 1832 and its processes for electing the borough council, which had met in the town hall, was also reformed under the Borough Improvement Act 1860.

The building was given a new façade with a stucco finish in around 1860. The new facade was rusticated on the ground floor and featured a band between the two floors with a series of grotesques which were installed just below the band. The borough coat of arms, which featured a ship, was placed above the doorway and the coat of arms of Henry Guy encircled in Acanthus leaves was installed just below the first floor window. By the mid-1890s the lock-up was damp and deteriorating and its use was discontinued in 1898, when a purpose-built police station was established in the Market Place.

In July 1919, after the end of the First World War, a large crown assembled on the local cricket field and marched to the town hall as part of the "Peace Day" events. The building continued to serve as the headquarters of Hedon Borough Council for much of the 20th century, but ceased to be the local seat of government when the enlarged Holderness District Council was formed in 1974. The building, instead became the offices and meeting place of Hedon Town Council.

== See also ==
- Grade II* listed buildings in the East Riding of Yorkshire
- Listed buildings in Hedon
