= Hollym, East Riding of Yorkshire =

Village and civil parish in the East Riding of Yorkshire, England

Coordinates: 53°42′22″N 0°02′12″E

Hollym
- Location within the East Riding of Yorkshire
- Population: 513 (2011 census)
- OS grid reference: TA345252
  - London: 150 mi (240 km) S
- Civil parish: Hollym
- Unitary authority: East Riding of Yorkshire
- Ceremonial county: East Riding of Yorkshire
- Region: Yorkshire and the Humber
- Country: England
- Sovereign state: United Kingdom
- Post town: Withernsea
- Postcode district: HU19
- Dialling code: 01964
- Police: Humberside
- Fire: Humberside
- Ambulance: Yorkshire
- UK Parliament: Beverley and Holderness

Hollym is a village and civil parish in the East Riding of Yorkshire, England, in an area known as Holderness. It is situated approximately 2 miles (3 km) south of Withernsea and lies on the A1033 road.

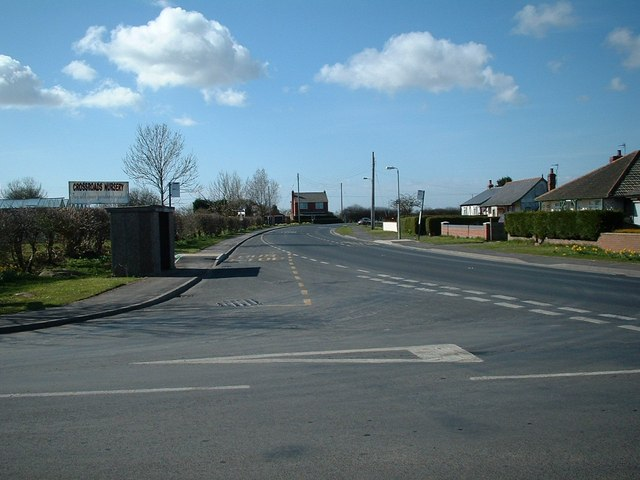
The A1033 road passing through Hollym

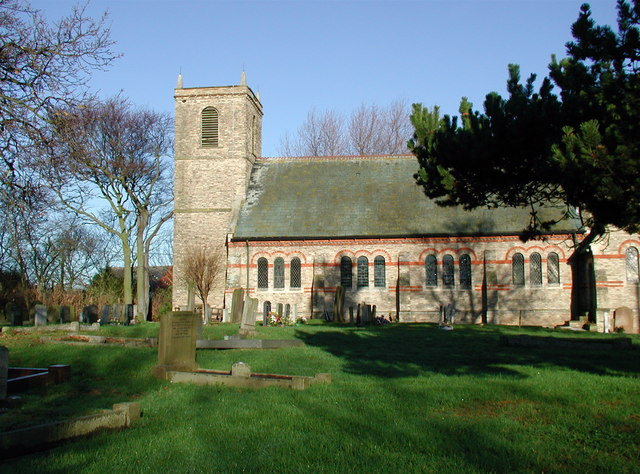
St Nicholas' Church, Hollym

According to the 2011 UK census, the parish had a population of 513, an increase on the 2001 UK census figure of 447.

The name Hollym probably derives from the plural form of either the Old English hol or the Old Norse holr meaning 'hollow'. Another suggestion is that the second element is derived from the Old English hām meaning 'village' or 'hamm' meaning 'hemmed-in land'.

Hollym Airfield lies just north of the village and is suitable for light aircraft.

St Nicholas' Church, Hollym, built in 1814, is a Grade II listed building.

In 1823, Hollym was a parish in the Wapentake and Liberty of Holderness. At that time the population was 260. Occupations included seventeen farmers, a corn miller, a schoolmaster, and the landlady of The Plough public house. A carrier operated weekly between the village and Hull.

Hollym was served from 1854 to 1964 by Hollym Gate railway station on the Hull and Holderness Railway.

Edmund Henry Barker, the English classical scholar, was born in the village.

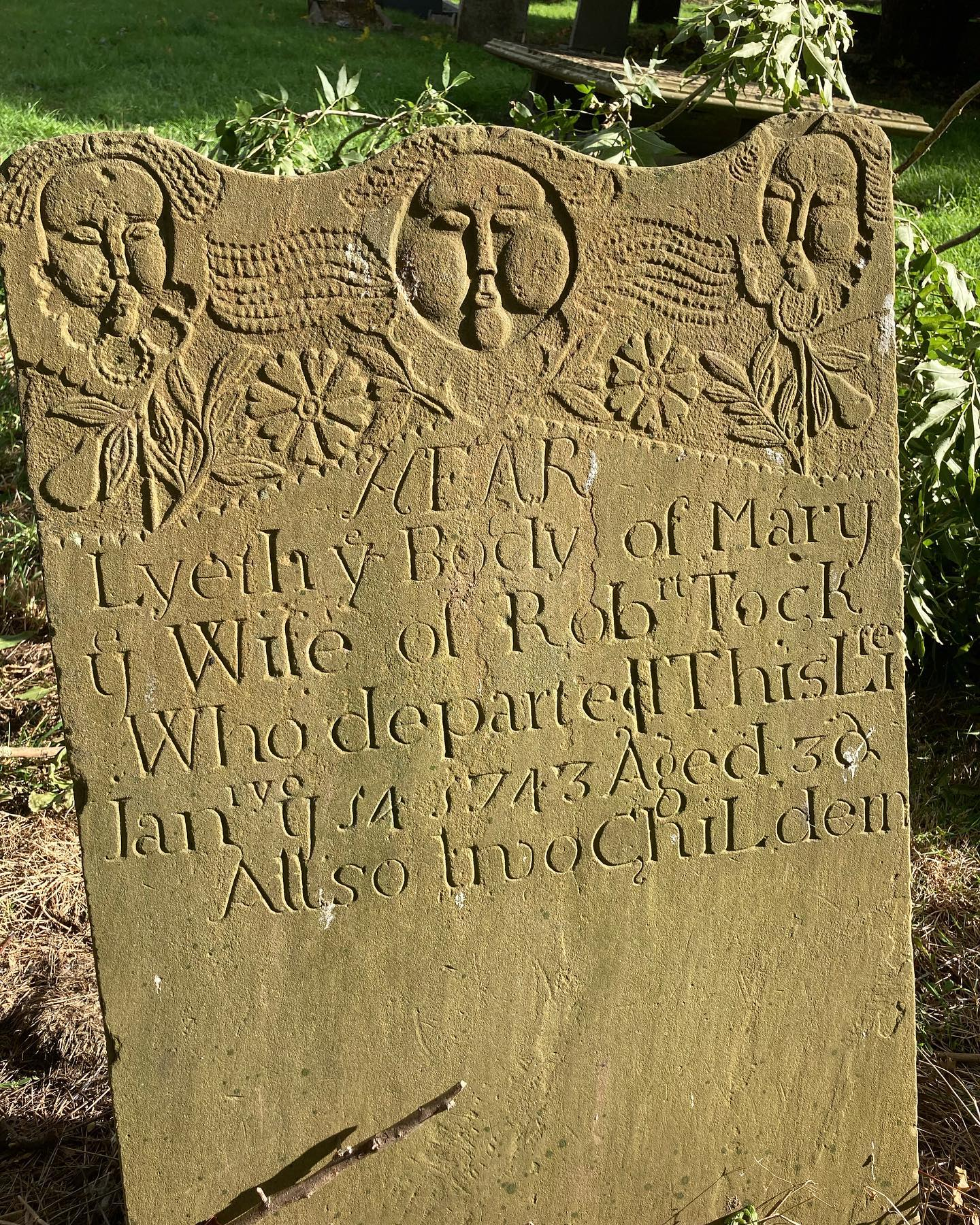
Gravestone in Hollym churchyard

== See also ==
- Listed buildings in Hollym, East Riding of Yorkshire
