= Listed buildings in Hedon =

Hedon is a civil parish in the county of the East Riding of Yorkshire, England. It contains 90 listed buildings that are recorded in the National Heritage List for England. Of these, one is listed at Grade I, the highest of the three grades, five are at Grade II*, the middle grade, and the others are at Grade II, the lowest grade. The parish contains the town of Hedon, to the east of the city of Hull. Most of the listed buildings are houses, cottages and associated structures, and shops, and the others include churches and associated structures, medieval structures and fragments in various sites, public houses, the town hall, farmhouses and farm buildings, former almshouses, a former forge, and a telephone kiosk.

== Key ==
Grade	Criteria
I	Buildings of exceptional interest, sometimes considered to be internationally important
II*	Particularly important buildings of more than special interest
II	Buildings of national importance and special interest

== Buildings ==
Name and location	Photograph	Date	Notes	Grade
St Augustine's Church; 53.74154°N 0.19985°W		Early 13th century	The church has been altered and extended through the centuries, including restorations between 1868 and 1877 by G. E. Street. It is built in stone, and has a cruciform plan, consisting of a nave with a clerestory, north and south aisles, north and south transepts, a chancel , and a tower at the crossing. The tower is tall, with buttress]es, pairs of pointed windows, above which are pairs of pointed bell openings with clock faces between, and a pierced parapet with eight crocketed pinnacles. The south door has a round arch and three orders of colonnettes, and on the gable end of the south transept is a rose window.	I
Medieval monuments in the garden of Ivy House; 53.74236°N 0.20139°W		Medieval	The medieval fragments were collected from various places. They include piers, an arcade, a summerhouse known as Albina's Tomb built from fragments, an archway, a doorway and a tomb.	II
Medieval and later monuments in the garden of Windyridge; 53.74189°N 0.20115°W	—	Medieval	The fragments were collected from various places. The medieval ones include an arch, a pier, a font, capitals, a basin, a base, and a grotesque head. Dating from the 18th century are an octagonal vase-shaped font, and a vase-shaped sundial with a gadrooned top and a copper dial.	II
Ravenspurn Cross; 53.74140°N 0.19679°W		Early 15th century	Also known as the Kilnsea Cross, it is in the garden of Holyrood House, to the south of the house. It is in stone and about 20 feet (6.1 m) in height. The cross has a square four-step plinth, an octagonal base, and an octagonal cross shaft with a decorated capital. This is surmounted by an elaborate carved cross decorated with figures, but badly eroded.	II*
Base of cross shaft 53.74696°N 0.19832°W	—	15th century (probable)	The medieval cross base is in stone, and is in the garden of Birkholme, about 5 yards from the southeast corner of the house.	II
Stone tracery and voussoirs 53.74634°N 0.19909°W	—	15th century	The stone tracery and voussoirs are in the garden of Birkholme, to the south of the house. They are part of the original west window of Holy Trinity Church, Hull, and were brought to the present site in 1863. The window is about 18 feet (5.5 m) in height, it is in moulded stone, and the tracery is in Perpendicular style.	II
Stone set in cobbles, Market Place; 53.74099°N 0.19874°W	—	17th century or earlier	The stone is in front of 4 Market Place, near the edge of the road. It consists of a stone, with the remains of an iron ring, that was used for bull-baiting.	II
63 and 65 Souttergate; 53.74339°N 0.19918°W		Late 17th century (probable)	Two houses in roughcast brick on a plinth, with a pantile roof, and tumbled brickwork on the left gable end. There are two storeys and seven bays. The doorways are on the outer bays, the left with a rectangular fanlight, and the right with pilasters and a hood. The windows are sash windows, and there are four blocked windows on the upper floor.	II
Town Hall; 53.74041°N 0.19880°W		1693	The town hall is stuccoed, with a rusticated ground floor, a moulded floor band on grotesque masks at the corners and green man masks in the centre, a modillion eaves cornice, and a tile roof with coped gables on moulded kneelers. There are two storeys and three bays, the middle bay projecting under a pediment. In the centre is a doorway in a shouldered and moulded surround, with a pulvinated frieze, a moulded cornice with shaped modillions, and a badge on the keystone. The windows are sashes, with blocked surrounds on the ground floor, and plain raised surrounds on the upper floor.	II*
The Old Hall; 53.73950°N 0.19589°W		c. 1700	The house is in brown brick, with wooden gutter brackets, and a pantile roof with a narrow valley and coped gables carried across valley to form a parapet. There are two storeys, a double depth plan, a front range of five bays, and a rear wing with tumbled brickwork on the gable. The central doorway has a rectangular fanlight, and a hood on carved scrolled consoles. The windows are sashes with rubbed voussoirs and keystones. On the east front is a French window.	II*
The New Hall; 53.73934°N 0.19847°W		1730–42	The house is in brown brick, and has a slate roof with overhanging eaves on long moulded brackets at the front, and a pantile roof at the rear. There are two storeys, a double depth plan, and a front range of five bays. In the centre is a porch on two Tuscan columns and half-columns, with an entablature and a dentilled pediment, and a doorway with a moulded surround. The windows are sashes with keystones. To the right is a projecting two-storey two-bay gabled wing with an oculus in the gable. At the rear is a brick parapet with stone coping, and a porch with reeded pilasters and a pedimented gable.	II*
32 Baxtergate; 53.74123°N 0.19593°W		18th century (probable)	The house is in brown brick with a pitched and sprocketed pantile roof. There are two storeys and two bays. The windows are modern casements.	II
Outbuildings, 11 Fletcher Gate; 53.73927°N 0.19895°W		18th century or earlier	The two outbuildings, that flank the east side of Sheriff Highway, are in brown brick with pantile roofs. The northern building has two storeys, tumbled brickwork on the gable end, and it contains doorways. The southern building has one storey, oversailing eaves, and it contains carriage doors, windows, one a horizontal sliding sash, vents, and a band on the gable end.	II
10 Magdalen Street and barn 53.74145°N 0.19766°W		18th century	The house and barn attached to the right are in brown brick, with pantile roofs and tumbled brickwork on the gables. The house has two storeys and three bays. The doorway has a gabled hood, and the windows are sashes, one horizontally sliding. The barn contains a segmental-arched opening.	II
4 Market Hill; 53.74228°N 0.19995°W		18th century	The rear is the older part, with the front dating from the mid-19th century. The house is in whitewashed brick, and has a pantile roof with coped gables and tumbled brickwork on the left gable end. There are two storeys and three bays. The central doorway has Tuscan pilasters, a full entablature and panelled reveals. The windows are sashes, on the ground floor with moulded surrounds, and moulded cornices on long scrolled consoles, and on the upper floor with moulded voussoirs and keystones. At the rear are sash windows with channelled voussoirs and gadrooned keystones.	II
Outhouse north of 10 Market Hill; 53.74258°N 0.19996°W		18th century	The outhouse attached to a school at the north is in red brick, and has a lean-to pantile roof with a coped gable on a stone kneeler. There is one storey, and it contains a doorway and a horizontally sliding sash window.	II
18–22 Market Place; 53.74137°N 0.19871°W		18th century	Two shops and a house on a corner site, in brown brick, with a pantile roof, and coped gables, the right with small parapets at the corners. There are two storeys, and the south front contains a shopfront and a sash window above. On the west front, to the left, is an early 19th century shopfront with four panelled pilasters, a modillion cornice on consoles, a central doorway with a reeded transom, and a rectangular fanlight, flanked by windows. Elsewhere on the front are sash windows of differing sizes. The left return has three bays, a central doorway with moulded pilasters, a Tuscan entablature, and a rectangular fanlight.	II
6 and 8 Souttergate; 53.74163°N 0.19871°W		18th century	A pair of rendered shops with a pantile roof. There are two storeys and two bays. On the outer part of each bay is a doorway with a Tuscan surround, flanking sash windows with moulded cornices. The upper floor contains two sash windows.	II
21 Souttergate; 53.74207°N 0.19900°W		18th century	The house is in colourwashed brick on a plinth, with a pitched and sprocketed pantile roof. There are two storeys and two bays. On the right is a doorway with a plain surround. The windows are horizontal sliding sashes; the ground floor window is tripartite.	II
29 and 31 Souttergate; 53.74223°N 0.19905°W		18th century	A pair of houses in colourwashed brick with a pitched and sprocketed pantile roof. There are two storeys and two bays. On the right of each house is a doorway, the right with a moulded surround and a blind rectangular fanlight. The windows are sashes.	II
30 and 32 Souttergate; 53.74233°N 0.19883°W		18th century	Two houses in brown brick, with a pantile roof and a coped gable on the left. There are two storeys and three bays. There are two doorways with rectangular fanlights, and the windows are sashes. The ground floor windows and left doorway have wedge lintels.	II
33 Souttergate; 53.74229°N 0.19909°W		18th century	The house is in colourwashed brick with a pitched and sprocketed pantile roof. There are two storeys and two bays. The central doorway has a rectangular fanlight, and the windows are sashes.	II
37 and 39 Souttergate; 53.74243°N 0.19916°W	—	18th century	A pair of houses in brown brick, with a pitched and sprocketed pantile roof, and tumbled brickwork on the right gable end. There are two storeys and two bays. In the centre are paired doorways with rectangular fanlights. The windows are sashes, and the ground floor openings have wedge lintels. Flanking the doorways are iron foot scrapers.	II
38 Souttergate; 53.74245°N 0.19888°W		18th century	The house is in pink brick with a pantile roof. There are two storeys and two bays. The central doorway has fluted pilasters, a moulded cornice, and reveals with fielded panels, and the windows are sashes.	II
41 and 43 Souttergate; 53.74253°N 0.19921°W	—	18th century	The house, which was altered in the mid-19th century, has a stuccoed front, and a pitched and sprocketed pantile roof. There are two storeys and three bays. On the front is a doorway with panelled pilasters and a rectangular fanlight. The windows are sashes, those on the ground floor with wedge lintels, the left window with an ornamental stucco keystone. To the left of the doorway is an iron foot scraper.	II
53 and 55 Souttergate; 53.74284°N 0.19936°W		18th century	A pair of houses in brown brick, with bracketed eaves, a pantile roof and coped gables. There are two storeys and two bays. Each house has a doorway on the left with a rectangualr fanlight, and the windows are sashes.	II
59 Souttergate; 53.74305°N 0.19930°W		18th century	The older part of the house is the rear wing, with the front range dating from mid-19th century. The house is in brown brick, with two storeys. The front range has a slate roof and three bays. The central doorway has Tuscan pilasters, a rectangular fanlight and a modillion entablature. The windows are sashes, those on the ground floor with channelled stucco voussoirs. The rear wing has a pantile roof and tumbled brickwork on the gable end, and three bays, with a single-bay extension to the west. The doorway has a rectangular fanlight and the windows are sashes.	II
8 and 10 St Augustine's Gate; 53.73975°N 0.19882°W	—	18th century	A pair of shops in brown brick, with a pantile roof and tumbled brick on the right gable. There are two storeys and two bays. On the ground floor, the right shop has a doorway with a late 19th-century moulded lintel, and the left shop has a modern shopfront. The upper floor contains sash windows.	II
11 St Augustine's Gate; 53.74006°N 0.19904°W		18th century	A house, later used for other purposes, in red brick, with a pantile roof and coped gables. There are two storeys and four bays. The main doorway has a Tuscan surround and a blocked rectangular fanlight, and to the right is a smaller doorway under a cambered brick arch. The windows are sash windows under cambered brick arches.	II
Outbuilding northeast of Burnham House; 53.74273°N 0.19863°W		18th century	The outbuilding is in brown brick, with a sprocketed and pitched pantile roof. There are two storeys and two bays. On the front is a doorway and sash windows.	II
Harbour Farmhouse; 53.73459°N 0.20236°W	—	Mid-18th century	The farmhouse is in brown brick, and has a pantile roof, hipped at the west end, and with tumbled brickwork on the east gable. There are two storeys and attics, and an L-shaped plan, with a lean-to in the angle. The doorway has a Tuscan surround, it is flanked by canted bay windows with moulded cornices, and the windows are sashes. On the west front is a loading door, and a small attic window.	II
Livers Farmhouse; 53.74632°N 0.19650°W	—	Mid-18th century	The farmhouse is in brown brick, and has a pantile roof, catslide at the rear, with tumbled brickwork on the gables. There are two storeys and three bays. The doorway has a moulded surround and a rectangular fanlight, and the windows are sashes.	II
Station Farmhouse; 53.74402°N 0.19837°W		18th century	The house is in brown brick, and has a pantile roof, catslide at the rear, and tumbled brickwork on the gables. In the centre is a doorway with a gabled hood, and casement windows under segmental arches.	II
Thornlea House; 53.74237°N 0.19912°W		18th century	The house is in colourwashed brick, and has a pitched and sprocketed pantile roof with tumbled brickwork on the left gable end. There are two storeys and two bays. The central doorway has a moulded surround, a rectangular fanlight and a moulded cornice. The windows are sashes, those on the ground floor with stucco lintels.	II
Mill House; 53.73470°N 0.19942°W		1771	The house is in brown brick with a pantile roof. There is one storey and three bays. In the centre is a doorway and a canopy with a wavy bargeboard, and the flanking windows are sashes. All the openings have segmental heads.	II
6 and 8 Market Hill; 53.74240°N 0.19996°W		Late 18th century	A pair of houses in brown brick with a pantile roof. There are two storeys and three bays. The doorways are in the centre, and each has a rectangular three-light fanlight, and the windows are sashes.	II
14 Market Place; 53.74125°N 0.19862°W	—	Late 18th century	The shop is in brown brick, with a moulded and bracketed eaves cornice, and a pantile roof. There are two storeys and two bays. On the ground floor is a doorway with a Tuscan surround and a dentilled cornice, and to its left is a shop window. The upper floor contains sash windows.	II
16 Market Place; 53.74129°N 0.19862°W	—	Late 18th century	The shop is in brown brick, with a moulded and bracketed eaves cornice, and a pantile roof. There are two storeys and two bays. On the ground floor is a shopfront with a bow window, and a recessed doorway to the right. The upper floor contains sash windows.	II
Kirk House; 53.74119°N 0.19861°W		Late 18th century	The house is in brown brick, with a moulded bracketed eaves cornice and a pantile roof. There are two storeys and four bays. The doorway has two three-quarter Tuscan columns, a rectangular fanlight, a frieze with a fret pattern, and a moulded cornice. The windows are sashes with stucco lintels.	II
The Paddock; 53.74201°N 0.19875°W		Late 18th century	The house is in colourwashed brick, with a dentilled eaves cornice, and a pantile roof with coped gables on stone kneelers. There are two storeys and three bays. The central doorway has pilasters with sunk panels, a semicircular fanlight and a modillion pediment. The windows are sashes with gadrooned keystones. To the right is a round-headed passage doorway.	II
Painter's Cottages; 53.74269°N 0.19926°W		1777	Originally almshouses, the three cottages are in colourwashed brick, with a pantile roof and one storey. On the front are three doorways, three windows and an inscribed and dated plaque.	II
22–26 St Augustine's Gate; 53.74024°N 0.19885°W		c. 1785	A house, later three shops, in brown brick, with a bracketed gutter, and a sprocketed pantile roof with a coped right gable on cut kneelers. There are two storeys and five bays, and a southeast rear wing. The left shop has a modern shopfront, the other two shopfronts date from the mid-19th century, and have horizontally rusticated stucco quoins. On the upper floor are sash windows with channelled lintels and keystones. On the wing is a round-arched sash window and a horizontally sliding sash window.	II
Burnham House; 53.74263°N 0.19903°W		c. 1785	The house is in brown brick, and has a pitched and sprocketed pantile roof with coped gables on shaped modillion and dentilled kneelers. There are two storeys and five bays, a lean-to extension at the rear, and southeast and northeast wings. The central doorway has a moulded surround, a dentilled transom, a rectangular fanlight, and a modillion pediment on scrolled consoles. The windows are sashes with channelled stucco voussoirs.	II
34 and 36 Souttergate; 53.74238°N 0.19885°W		Late 18th to early 19th century	Two houses in brown brick with a pantile roof. There are two storeys and four bays. The two doorways on the right have reeded transoms and blind rectangular fanlights, and the windows are sashes. The ground floor windows and the left doorway have wedge lintels.	II
Farm buildings, Harbour Farm; 53.73468°N 0.20190°W	—	18th or early 19th century	The farm buildings are in brown brick, with pantile roofs, and are mainly in one storey. One range is attached to the north of Harbour Farmhouse and runs along the north side of farmyard; the other returns along the east side of the farmyard. At the south end of the east range is a two-storey block with external brick steps.	II
Kings Head Public House; 53.74155°N 0.19868°W		Late 18th or early 19th century	The public house, on a corner site, is rendered, and has bracketed eaves, and a sprocketed and hipped pantile roof. There are two storeys, two bays on the front, two on the left return, and one on the chamfered corner. On the main front is a doorway with a rectangular fanlight. The flanking windows and the doorway have moulded stucco heads with keystones and hood moulds. On the upper floor are sash windows, and on the corner is a worn limestone mounting block.	II
Presbytery, wall and archway, St Mary and St Joseph's Church; 53.74018°N 0.19642°W		18th or early 19th century	The presbytery is in brown brick with a hipped pantile roof. There are two storeys, and on the front facing the road are four sash windows. To the left is a brick wall with a projection containing a flat-arched doorway.	II
The Smithy; 53.74092°N 0.19768°W		18th or early 19th century	The forge, later converted for residential use, is in brown brick, and has a pantile roof with tumbled brickwork on the left gable end. There is a single storey, and on the front are three doorways and three horizontally sliding sash windows.	II
Royal British Legion Club; 53.74142°N 0.19824°W		1801	Originally a Baptist chapel, the building is in brown brick, with a hipped pantile roof and a front of three bays. The other bays contain round-arched openings, the left with a doorway and a blocked fanlight, and the right with a blocked doorway. The middle bay projects slightly, and contains a round-headed window, and above it is an inscribed and dated oval plaque.	II
St Mary and St Joseph's Church; 53.74019°N 0.19660°W		1803	The church is in brown brick with a pantile roof. It has a rectangular plan with an apse at each end. On the sides are tall round-arched windows, and at the north end is a lower block with three blind round-arched recesses.	II*
1–3 Kings Place; 53.74112°N 0.19714°W		c. 1820	A terrace of three houses in brown brick, with paired gutter brackets and a hipped pantile roof. There are two storeys and six bays. Each of the three doorways has a rectangular fanlight, the left has a Tuscan frame, and the others have moulded frames. The right house has a canted bay window with Tuscan piers and a full entablature, and the other windows are sashes with segmental heads. The street sign has good incised letters with serifs.	II
Magdalen House; 53.74171°N 0.19753°W		c. 1820	The house is in red brick with stone dressings, and a pantile roof with stone coped gables and kneelers. There are two storeys and three bays. The central porch has slender Doric columns, and an elaborate cornice with paired brackets, and the doorway has a rectangular fanlight. This is flanked by tripartite square bay windows with Doric pilasters and elaborate cornices with paired brackets, and the upper floor contains sash windows.	II
32 and 34 Fletcher Gate; 53.73954°N 0.19837°W		Early 19th century	A pair of houses in brown brick, the roof tiled with a moulded coped gable. The front facing the road has a pediment over two storeys and two bays. The windows are sashes, those on the upper floor with mullions between two round-arched lights.	II
36 and 38A Fletcher Gate; 53.73953°N 0.19855°W		Early 19th century	A house and a shop in brown brick, the roof tiled with a moulded coped gable. The front facing the road has a pediment over two storeys and two bays. The windows are sashes, those on the upper floor with mullions between two round-arched lights. On the left return is a shopfront.	II
38 Fletcher Gate; 53.73960°N 0.19868°W		Early 19th century	A shop in whitewashed brick with a lean-to roof and two storeys. The ground floor contains a modern shopfront, and on the upper floor are small-pane industrial windows flanking a loading door.	II
7 George Street; 53.74090°N 0.19800°W		Early 19th century	The house is in brown bricks, with paired brackets to the eaves, and a pantile roof with tumbled brickwork on the right gable end. There are two storeys and two bays. The doorway on the left has a rectangular fanlight, the windows are sashes, and all the openings have segmental lintels.	II
6 Magdalen Gate; 53.74140°N 0.19807°W		Early 19th century	A house in colourwashed brick with a pantile roof. There are two storeys and three bays. The central doorway has pilasters, a frieze and a cornice, and the windows are sashes.	II
5 Market Hill; 53.74278°N 0.20022°W		Early 19th century	The house is in brown brick, and has a pantile roof with stone coping. There are two storeys and three bays. The central doorway has a rectangular fanlight, and the windows are sashes.	II
54 and 56 Sheriff Highway; 53.73670°N 0.19988°W	—	Early 19th century	A pair of houses in brown brick with a pantile roof. There are two storeys and two bays. In the centre are paired doorways, the windows are sash windows, those on the ground floor horizontally sliding, and all the openings have segmental heads.	II
23 and 25 Souttergate; 53.74216°N 0.19902°W		Early 19th century	A pair of houses in brown brick with a pantile roof. There are two storeys and two bays. The doorways on the outer parts have plain surrounds, and the windows are horizontally sliding sashes.	II
Ivy House; 53.74245°N 0.20103°W		Early 19th century	The house is in brown brick, and has a pantile roof with coped gables and shaped stone kneelers. There are two storeys, a double depth plan, a front range of three bays, and a single-storey rear wing. The central doorway has a moulded surround, a dentilled transom, a rectangular fanlight, and a modillion cornice. This is flanked by canted bay windows, and the upper floor contains sash windows.	II
Markham Cottage; 53.74095°N 0.19712°W		Early 19th century	The house is in brown brick with a hipped pantile roof. There are two storeys and fronts of three bays. In the centre of the west front is a doorway with a wooden surround and sunk panels, and a rectangular fanlight. The middle bay of the south front has a blocked opening on each front. The windows are sashes, those on the ground floor with stucco lintels.	II
2 Market Place; 53.74090°N 0.19864°W		1828–29	A shop on a corner site in brown brick, with a stuccoed parapet containing anthemion decoration. There are three storeys, two bays on the front, two bays on the right return and a curved corner between. The shopfront has a fascia on moulded and scrolled consoles. The windows are sashes with channelled stucco voussoirs and ornamental keystones.	II
4 Market Place; 53.74097°N 0.19864°W		1828–29	The shop is in brown brick, with a stuccoed parapet containing anthemion decoration. There are three storeys and one bay. The shopfront has moulded pilasters, and a modern fascia on moulded and scrolled consoles. The windows are sashes with channelled stucco voussoirs and ornamental keystones.	II
6 Market Place; 53.74101°N 0.19863°W		1828–29	The shop is in brown brick, with a stuccoed parapet containing anthemion decoration. There are three storeys and one bay. The shopfront has a bow window, and a doorway with a reeded transom, a rectangular fanlight, moulded pilasters, and moulded and scrolled consoles to the entablature. The windows are sashes with channelled stucco voussoirs and ornamental keystones.	II
8 Market Place; 53.74105°N 0.19864°W		1828–29	The shop is in brown brick, with a stuccoed parapet containing anthemion decoration. There are three storeys and one bay. The shopfront has a window flanked by two doors with reeded transoms, rectangular fanlights, moulded pilasters, scrolled and moulded consoles, and a modern fascia. The windows are sashes with channelled stucco voussoirs and ornamental keystones.	II
24 and 26 Baxtergate; 53.74098°N 0.19589°W		Early or mid-19th century	A pair of houses in brown brick, with gutter brackets and a pantile roof. There are two storeys and two bays. The doorways have plain surrounds, and the windows are sashes.	II
30 Baxtergate; 53.74115°N 0.19589°W		Early or mid-19th century	The house is in brown brick with a pantile roof. There are two storeys and one bay. The doorway on the right has a plain surround, the windows are sashes, and all the openings have wedge lintels.	II
38 Baxtergate; 53.74145°N 0.19602°W		Early or mid-19th century	The house is in brown brick, with bracketed gutters and a slate roof. There are two storeys and two bays. The main doorway has a rectangular fanlight, and to the right is a passage doorway with a semicircular fanlight. The windows are sashes. The ground floor window and the main doorway have wedge lintels with keystones.	II
10 Market Place; 53.74111°N 0.19864°W		Early or mid-19th century	The shop is in brown brick, with a bracketed eaves cornice, and a pantile roof with coped gables on cut stone kneelers. There are three storeys and two bays. The shopfront is modern, and to its right is a recessed porch with a depressed arched head, imposts and a keystone. The windows are sashes, those on the middle floor with channelled stucco voussoirs and keystones.	II
9–13 Souttergate; 53.74181°N 0.19890°W		Early or mid-19th century	A row of two houses and a shop in brown brick on a plinth, with paired gutter brackets, and a pantile roof with a coped gable on the right on a shaped kneeler. There are two storeys and four bays. The shop on the left has a shopfront with four reeded pilasters, a moulded cornice on reeded consoles, a central bow window, and a doorway on the left. Between the other bays are two doorways with rectangular fanlights, the windows are sashes, and all the openings have channelled stucco voussoirs. Each building has a cast iron foot scraper with an arched head and a mask at the apex.	II
15 Souttergate; 53.74192°N 0.19892°W	—	Early or mid-19th century	The shop is in brown brick on a plinth, the gutter brackets with lions' head ornament, and with a slate roof. There are two storeys and three bays. On the right is a shopfront with four panelled pilasters, and a moulded cornice. To its left is a doorway with a moulded surround and a rectangular fanlight. Further to the left, and on the upper floor, are sash windows, the ground floor window with channelled stucco voussoirs.	II
1 St Augustine's Gate; 53.73961°N 0.19900°W	—	Early or mid-19th century	The shop is in brown brick with a slate roof. There are two storeys and one bay. The shopfront has reeded pilasters, and an entablature with horizontally fluted consoles. In the centre is a bow window with an apron, flanked by doorways that have rectangular fanlights with moulded transoms. The upper floor contains a sash window.	II
9 St Augustine's Gate; 53.73987°N 0.19904°W		Early or mid-19th century	A pair of shops in yellow brick, with a slate roof and coped gables. There are two storeys and three bays. On the ground floor are two shopfronts with fluted pilasters, and a central doorway with a rectangular fanlight, and a panel with a moulded surround above. In the centre of the upper floor is a blind panel, flanked by sash windows, all with channelled lintels and keystones.	II
21 St Augustine's Gate; 53.74047°N 0.19900°W		Early or mid-19th century	A shop in painted brick, with a bracketed eaves cornice and a pantile roof. There are two storeys and three bays. The shopfront has reeded pilasters, a fascia on horizontally reeded brackets, two bow windows with panelled aprons flanking a doorway with a rectangular fanlight. To the left is a doorway with a moulded surround, a rectangular fanlight and a triangular pediment. The upper floor contains sash windows.	II
Station Hotel; 53.74364°N 0.19910°W		Early or mid-19th century	The public house is in brown brick, with a floor band, and a hipped slate roof. There are two storeys and a front of four bays. The doorway on the front has panelled pilasters and reveals, and a rectangular fanlight. The right return has three bays, the middle bay is gabled and has a blocked oculus, a finial, and a gabled porch. The windows on both fronts are sashes.	II
Lambert House; 53.73738°N 0.19998°W		1830s	A room was added to the house in the late 19th century, made up of medieval masonry and items taken from various local churches. The house is rendered and has a slate roof. There are two storeys and attics, and it has a sill band, a flat-headed projecting porch, and a two-storey canted bay window, and most of the other windows are sashes.	II
2 Market Hill; 53.74181°N 0.19947°W		1840s	The house is in brown brick, with a slate roof, two storeys and attics. On the front are two bays, both gabled. The left bay projects slightly, and the gable has a stepped bargeboard with a drop finial. It contains a doorway with a moulded stucco surround, a two-light rectangular fanlight and a hood mould. Above is a sash window with a moulded surround and a hood mould, and in the gable is a small three-light attic window, the middle light taller. The gable on the right bay is shaped and coped, and the bay contains two similar windows; the ground floor window has shutters with moulded panels. The left return has a gable with a similar bargeboard, sash windows, the lower one with shutters, and a small similar three-light attic window.	II
11A George Street; 53.74091°N 0.19749°W		Mid-19th century	The house is in brown brick, with bracketed eaves and a slate roof. There are two storeys and three bays. The central doorway has a rectangular fanlight, the windows are sashes, and the ground floor openings have wedge lintels.	II
Garage block behind Kings Place; 53.74118°N 0.19682°W		Mid-19th century	Originally the stable block to Holyrood House, the building is in brown brick, with a stucco band and a slate roof with stone coped gables. On the front are four openings, three with depressed arches and the other with a flat head, and above are four rectangular panels. The right return has three round arches with stucco voussoirs and keystones. The band is inscribed "HOLYROOD".	II
10 Market Hill; 53.74250°N 0.19997°W		Mid-19th century	The house is in brown brick, with paired gutter brackets and a pantile roof. There are two storeys and two bays. The central doorway has a rectangular fanlight, and the windows are sashes. On the left is a lower extension with a coped gable, containing a horizontally sliding sash window.	II
45 Souttergate; 53.74262°N 0.19924°W		Mid-19th century	The house is stuccoed on the front, with vermiculated quoins, a sill band, bracketed eaves and a pantile roof with coped gables. There are two storeys and three bays. The central doorway has a Tuscan surround and a rectangular fanlight. The windows are sashes with moulded surrounds and ornamental keystones. To the right of the doorway is an iron foot scraper.	II
15 and 17 St Augustine's Gate; 53.74028°N 0.19902°W		Mid-19th century	A pair of houses in brown brick with a slate roof. There are two storeys and two bays. In the centre are paired doorways with moulded pilasters, rectangular fanlights, and an entablature with scrolled consoles. The windows are sashes with cambered lintels.	II
34 St Augustine's Gate; 53.74058°N 0.19880°W		Mid-19th century	A house in brown brick with sill bands, bracketed eaves, and a pantile roof with a coped gable and tumbled brickwork. There are two storeys and three bays. The central doorway has a Tuscan surround, deep reveals and a rectangular fanlight. It is flanked by canted bay windows with moulded cornices, and the upper floor contains sash windows with channelled stucco voussoirs.	II
36 St Augustine's Gate; 53.74065°N 0.19881°W		Mid-19th century	A shop in brown brick with bracketed eaves and a pantile roof. There are two storeys and two bays. On the ground floor is a modern shopfront, and the upper floor contains sash windows.	II
40 St Augustine's Gate and 2 George Street; 53.74080°N 0.19877°W	—	Mid-19th century	Two shops on a corner site in brown brick, with a bracketed eaves cornice, and a hipped slate roof. There are two storeys, two bays on the front, four on the left return and a curved corner between. On the front is a shopfront with four pilasters, a central doorway, a fascia and a moulded cornice. On the return is a shop window, and a doorway with a Tuscan surround and a rectangular fanlight. Flanking it, and on the upper floor, are sash windows with moulded stucco heads.	II
2 Vicar Lane; 53.74204°N 0.19949°W		Mid-19th century	The house is in brown brick, with bracketed eaves, and a roof of slate at the front and pantile at the rear. There are two storeys and four bays. The doorway has fluted pilasters, moulded cornices, and a dentilled pediment on fluted inverted consoles. The windows are sashes with decorated lintels, and between the floor is a decorated panel.	II
The Cottage and outbuildings 53.73941°N 0.19732°W		Mid-19th century	The house is in brown brick, with a floor band, and a pantile roof with coped gables. There are two storeys and three bays, and a lower two-storey one-bay extension on the left. The central doorway has a rectangular fanlight, and the windows are sashes; all the openings are under segmental arches. On the upper floor of the extension is a blind panel. Further to the left is a single-storey range of outbuildings.	II
38 St Augustine's Gate; 53.74072°N 0.19882°W		Late 19th century	A shop in brown brick with bracketed eaves and a sprocketed pantile roof. There are two storeys and two bays. On the ground floor is a modern shopfront, and the upper floor contains sash windows.	II
Telephone kiosk 53.74155°N 0.19888°W		1968	The telephone kiosk is of the K8 type designed by Bruce Martin. It has a square plan and a concrete base, and is in cast iron with aluminium doors. It is painted in cream, and on three sides are toughened glass. Under the flat domed roof are rectangular panels of toughened glass and the word "TELEPHONE".	II
