= Out Newton =

Hamlet in the East Riding of Yorkshire, England

Coordinates: 53.672600°N 0.090850°E

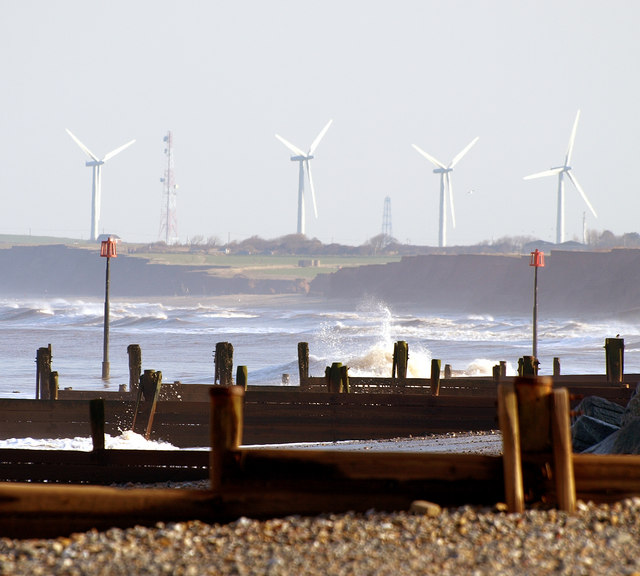
- Out Newton wind turbines from Withernsea Beach

- Location within the East Riding of Yorkshire
- OS grid reference: TA382216
- Civil parish: Easington
- Unitary authority: East Riding of Yorkshire
- Ceremonial county: East Riding of Yorkshire
- Region: Yorkshire and the Humber
- Country: England
- Sovereign state: United Kingdom
- Post town: WITHERNSEA
- Postcode district: HU19
- Dialling code: 01964
- Police: Humberside
- Fire: Humberside
- Ambulance: Yorkshire
- UK Parliament: Beverley and Holderness

Out Newton is a hamlet in the civil parish of Easington, in the East Riding of Yorkshire, England, in an area known as Holderness. It is situated just inland from the North Sea coast, approximately 4.5 miles (7.2 km) south-east of Withernsea, and 4.5 miles (7.2 km) east of Patrington.

Out Newton was formerly a township in the parish of Easington, in 1866 Out Newton became a separate civil parish, on 1 April 1935 the parish was abolished and merged with Easington. In 1931 the parish had a population of 31.

The hamlet was mentioned in the Domesday Book as having six ploughlands, 20 acres (8.1 ha) of meadowland and four villagers. The name is believed to stem from Outer Newton, with Newton itself meaning new homestead or village. It was formerly in the wapentake of Holderness.

A seven turbine wind farm, capable of generating 9 MW of electricity and operated by RWE, is situated on the coast near to the settlement.
