= Humber Forts =

Two sea forts in the Humber Estuary, England

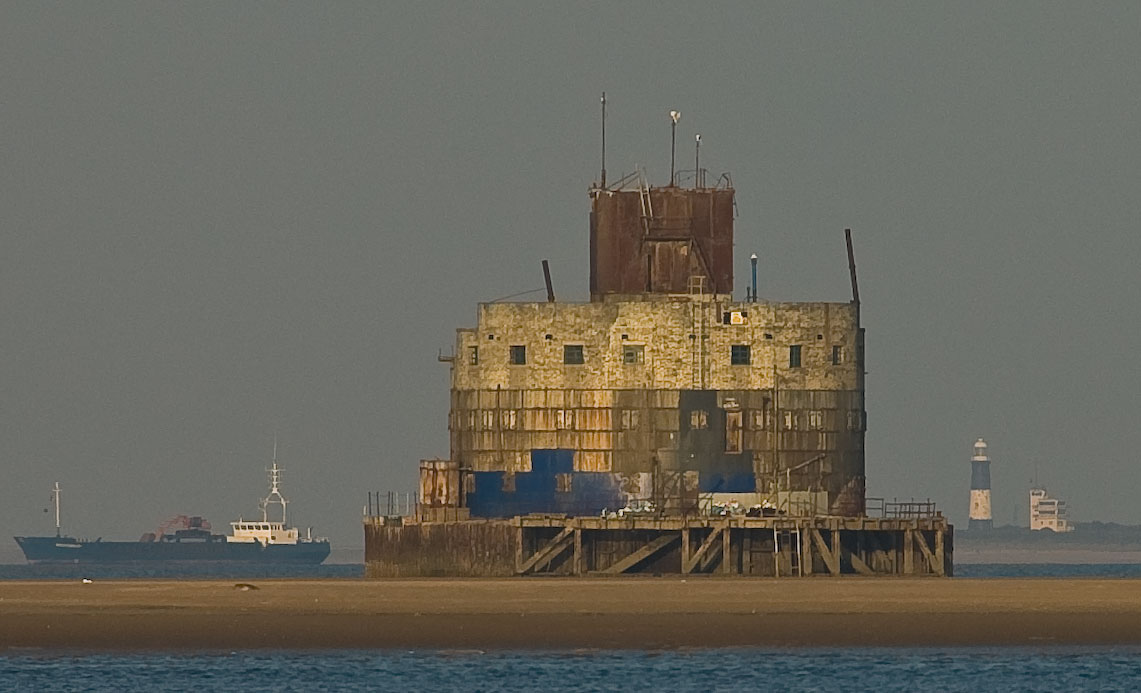
Haile Sand Fort

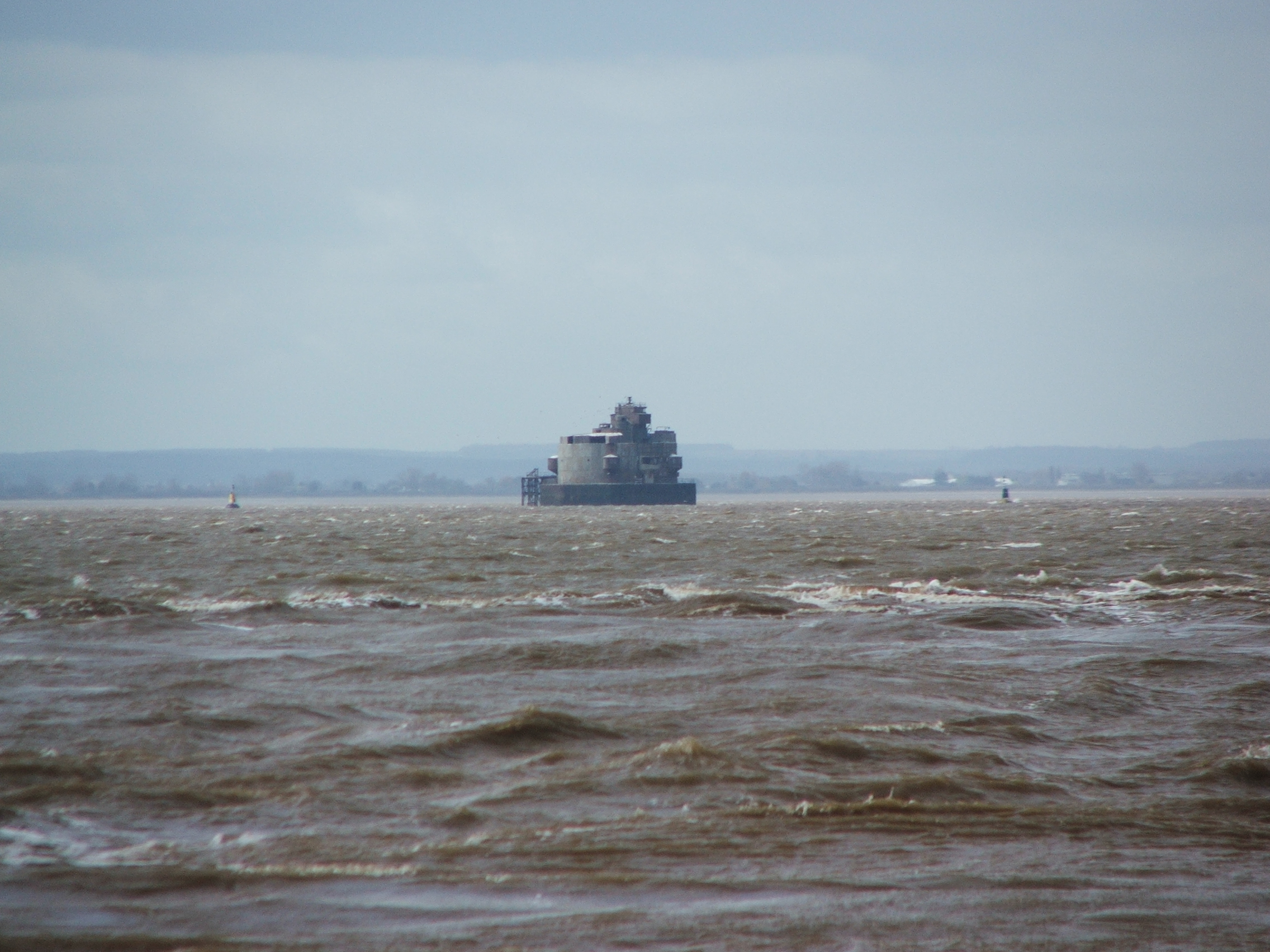
Bull Sand Fort

The Humber Forts are two large fortifications in the mouth of the Humber Estuary in northern England: Bull Sand Fort (53°33′43″N 0°4′3″E) and Haile Sand Fort (53°32′4″N 0°2′1″E).

== History ==
The two forts were planned in 1914, at the start of the First World War, to protect the sea entrance to the Humber Estuary. They stand 59 feet (18 m) above the water and have a diameter of 82 feet (25 m). There was accommodation for 200 soldiers. Started in May 1915, they took more than four years to build and construction was not finished until December 1919, a year after the war ended.

During the Second World War the forts were reactivated and modernised. They were regularly attacked by enemy aircraft. During this time, they installed submerged netting to prevent enemy submarines from travelling up the estuary to Hull or Grimsby. The forts were finally abandoned by the military in 1956.

=== Bull Sand Fort ===
Bull Sand Fort is 1.5 miles (2.4 km) from shore off Spurn Head. It is a 4-storey concrete building with 12-inch (300 mm) of armour on the seaward side, and originally armed with four 6-inch guns. It was built with great difficulty as its sandbank is 11 feet (3.4 m) below low water.

In 1987 it was given a Grade II Listed Building status. In 1997 it was sold to the Streetwise Charitable Trust, who intended to restore the fort for use as a drug rehabilitation facility. The plan failed eventually. The trust no longer operates. Administratively, it is within the East Riding of Yorkshire and civil parish of Easington.

In July 2022, it was listed for sale by auction, with a guide price of £50,000, through Savills estate agents. The fort was sold for £490,000.

=== Haile Sand Fort ===
Haile Sand Fort or Sand Haile Fort is the smaller of the two and is situated around the low-water mark between Cleethorpes and Humberston on the Lincolnshire coast.

In February 2016 the fort was put on the market. It remained unsold until it was put up for auction in October 2018. It was sold for £117,000 at the auction to an unnamed purchaser.

== See also ==
- Maunsell Forts
- Listed buildings in Easington, East Riding of Yorkshire
