= St Augustine's Church, Hedon =

Church of England church in the East Riding of Yorkshire, England

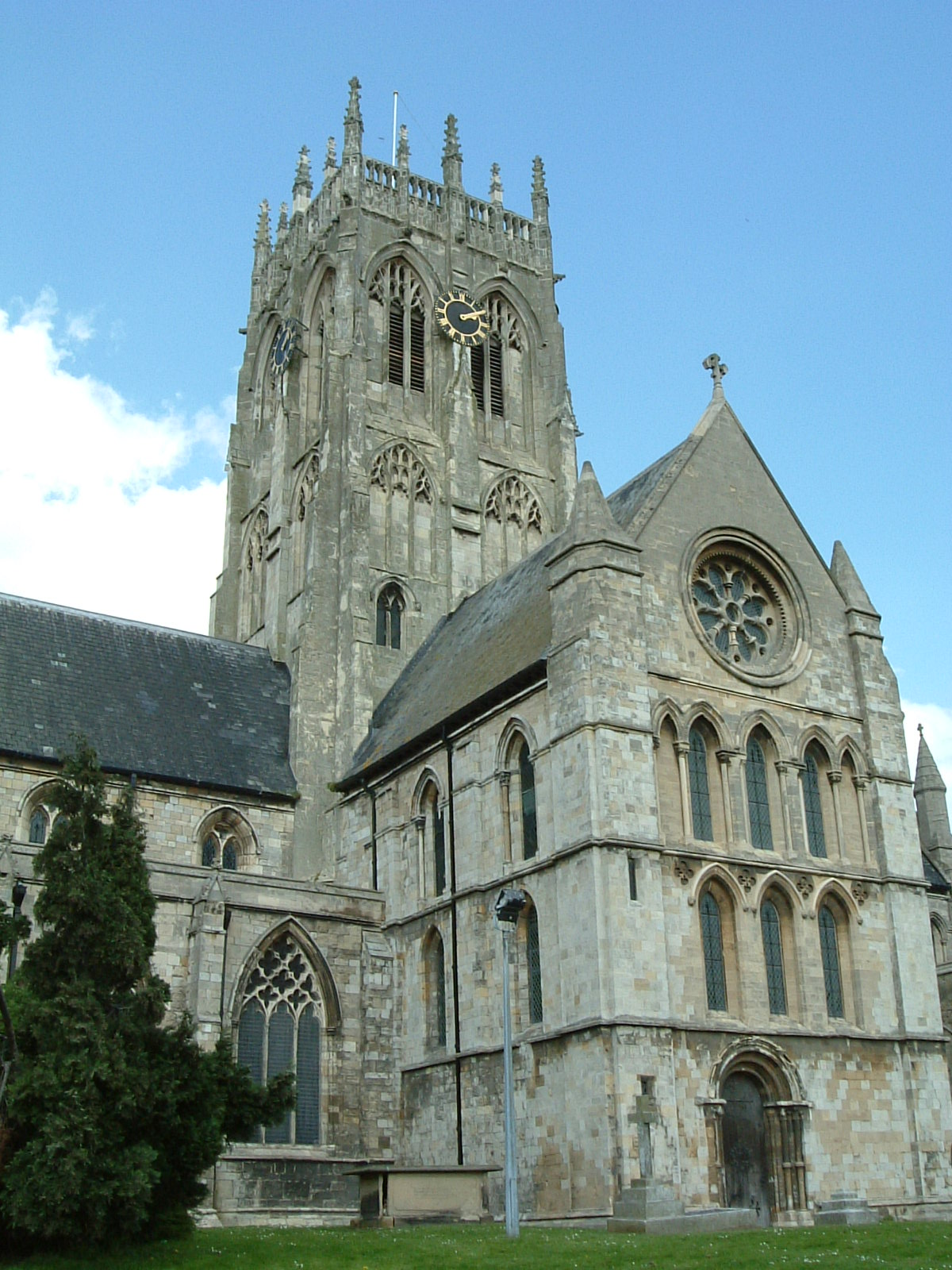
- St Augustine's Church, Hedon
- St Augustine's Church, Hedon
- 53.7415°N 0.1996°W
- OS grid reference: TA 187 286
- Denomination: Church of England
- Churchmanship: Broad Church

History
- Dedication: Augustine of Hippo

Administration
- Province: York
- Diocese: York
- Parish: Hedon

St Augustine's Church is a Church of England parish church located in Hedon, East Riding of Yorkshire, England. The church is a Grade I listed building.

== History ==
The church dates from the Middle Ages. The oldest part of the church dates from 1190.

It is commonly known as the King of Holderness.

=== Description from 1831 ===
Text from Thomas Allen's 'History of York' (1831).

"The church, a rectory dedicated to St Augustine of Hippo, is an Anglican church, valued in the parliamentary returns at £117 per annum. Patron, the sub-dean of York Minster. This church is held with the vicarage of Preston. It is the most interesting specimen of early pointed architecture in Holderness, and has recently been restored and carefully repaired under the direction of the rector, the Rev. W. Wasse, LL.D. In plan, it consists of a nave and aisles, transepts and chancel, with a handsome and lofty tower at the intersection. The west front is plain, and has a pointed window of five lights. The north side of the nave is made into five divisions by small buttresses, terminating beneath the parapet in angular caps. In each portion, except the second from the west, are pointed windows of three lights, with elegant tracery in the sweep of the arch; in the remaining division is a pointed doorway, with a trefoil head and pedimental canopy. The clerestory exhibits five small pointed windows, and the finish is an embattled parapet. The transept, though much mutilated and defaced, is an interesting specimen of early architecture. It has heavy buttresses at the angles, and in the centre is an elegant recessed doorway, the mouldings resting on dwarf columns. Above this doorway are two stories of windows, three in each, and all enriched with the small flower moulding so common in works of the period. The north side of the chancel has also two stories of windows; the upper are filled up and the lower partly open. The east end is similar to the portion of the church just noticed.

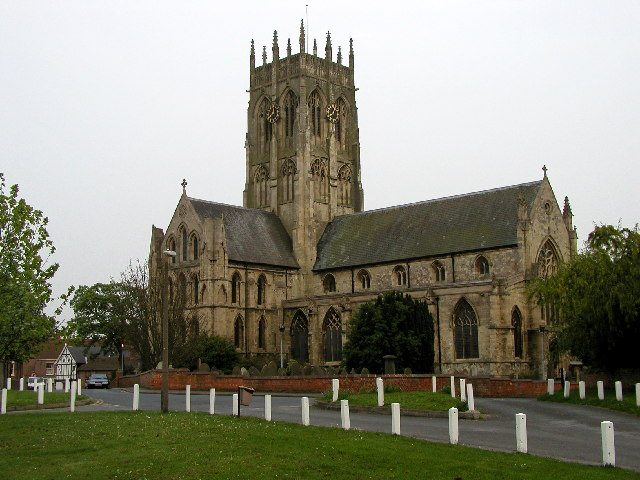
The church from Market Hill

The south side of the church is similar to the north, except in the transept, which has a large pointed window of five lights, with cinquefoil tracery; and beneath it a circular-headed doorway, of simple but particularly deep mouldings. They rest on three columns, with leaved capitals. Opposite the door is the mutilated effigy of a man in chain armour. The tower, which rises to a considerable height and is a prominent object in every view of Hedon, has double buttresses at the angles, and one in the centre of each face: there are two stories of pointed windows, two in each story, and each having three lights with tracery. The finish of this bold and handsome design is a pierced battlement of particular beauty, and each buttress has a crocketed pinnacle, with smaller ones disposed at regular intervals. The interior, since the late judicious and well-timed repairs have been executed, has assumed an air of respectability proper to the church of a corporate and borough town. The nave is separated from the aisles by five pointed arches, resting on column formed by a union of eight cylinders, with plain capitals. One entire intercolumination at the west end is occupied by a gallery, in which is an elegant organ, erected in 1829."

== Organ ==
The organ was built by Arthur Nelson in 1926. A specification of the organ can be found on the National Pipe Organ Register.

== See also ==
- Grade I listed churches in the East Riding of Yorkshire
- Listed buildings in Hedon
