= Easington, East Riding of Yorkshire =

Village and civil parish in the East Riding of Yorkshire, England

Coordinates: 53°39′04″N 0°06′53″E

Easington
- Village and civil parish
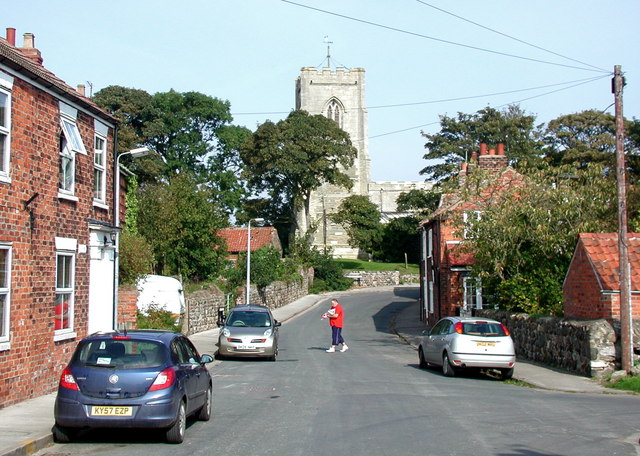
- Easington High Street

- Location within the East Riding of Yorkshire
- Population: 691 (2011 census)
- OS grid reference: TA398192
  - London: 150 mi (240 km) S
- Civil parish: Easington
- Unitary authority: East Riding of Yorkshire
- Ceremonial county: East Riding of Yorkshire
- Region: Yorkshire and the Humber
- Country: England
- Sovereign state: United Kingdom
- Post town: HULL
- Postcode district: HU12
- Dialling code: 01964
- Police: Humberside
- Fire: Humberside
- Ambulance: Yorkshire
- UK Parliament: Beverley and Holderness

Easington is a small village and civil parish in the East Riding of Yorkshire, England, in the area known as Holderness. A coastal settlement, it is situated between the Humber estuary and the North Sea at the south-eastern corner of the county, and at the end of the B1445 road from Patrington. The coastal town of Withernsea is approximately 6 miles (10 km) to the north-west.

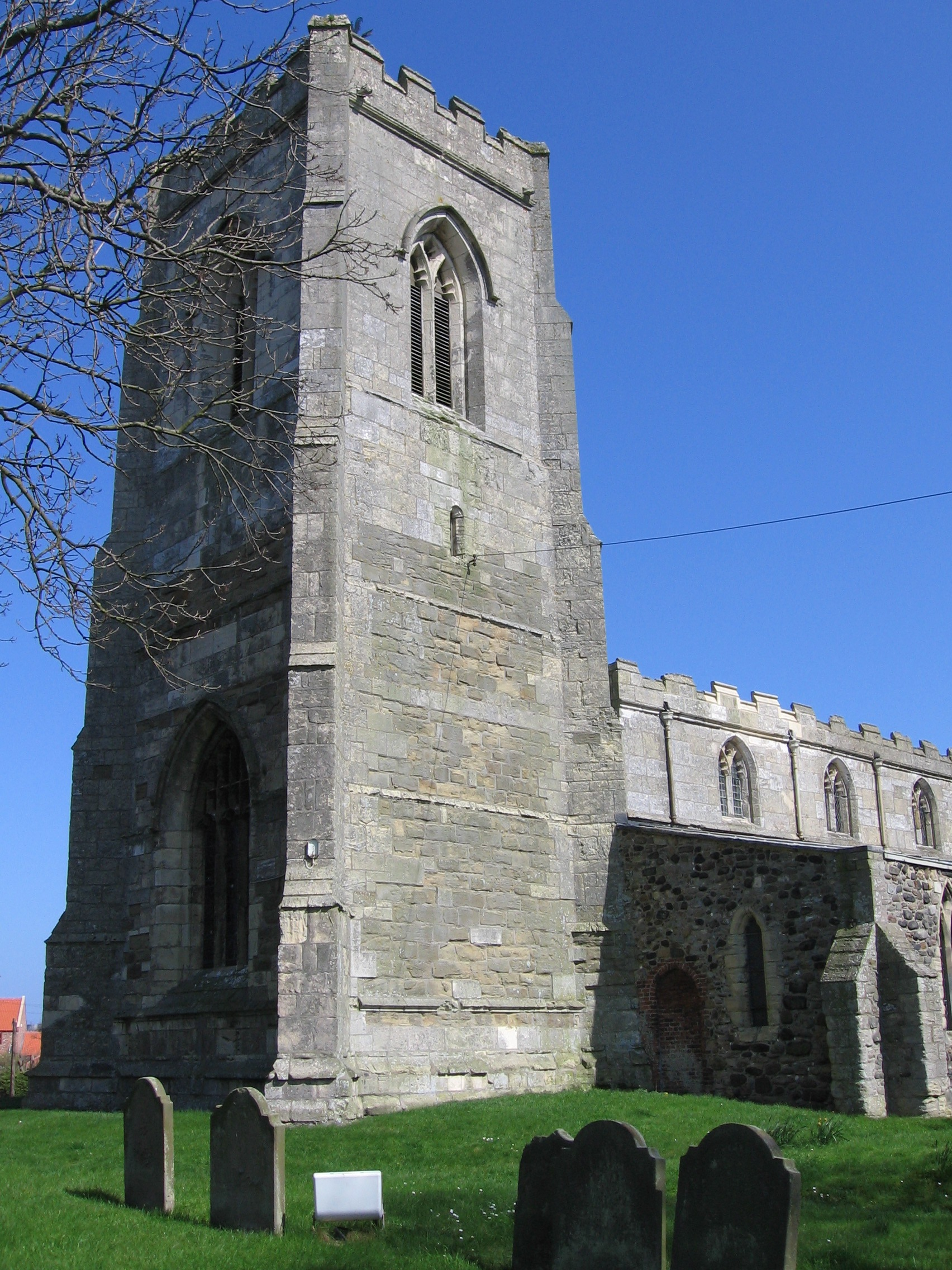
All Saints' Church, Easington

The civil parish is formed by the village of Easington and the hamlets of Kilnsea, Out Newton and Spurn Head. Bull Sand Fort is administered as part of the parish. According to the 2011 UK Census, Easington parish had a population of 691, a small decrease on the 2001 UK Census figure of 698.

The name Easington derives from the Old English Esaingtūn or Esiingtūn meaning 'settlement connected with Esa' or 'Esi'.

All Saints' Church, Easington is a Grade I listed building.

In 1823 the ecclesiastical parish incumbency was a perpetual curacy under the patronage of the Archbishop of York. The parish had a population of 488, with occupations that included a butcher, a corn miller, a weaver, two blacksmiths, two wheelwrights, two grocers, three shoemakers, four tailors, twelve farmers, two schoolmasters, a land surveyor, a yeoman, and the landlord of the Granby's Head public house. There were two carriers who operated between the village and Hull weekly.

Many years ago, the parish of Easington included Turmarr, Hoton, Northorpe, Dimlington, Old Kilnsea and Ravenser. These villages have been lost to the ever-encroaching sea, and some had disappeared as early as 1400.

The thatched Easington Tithe Barn is recorded in the National Heritage List for England as a Grade II* listed building, having been designated in 1987.

Easington is significant for being the birthplace of the Anglo-Canadian poet and literary scholar, Robin Skelton (1925–97).

== Gas terminal ==
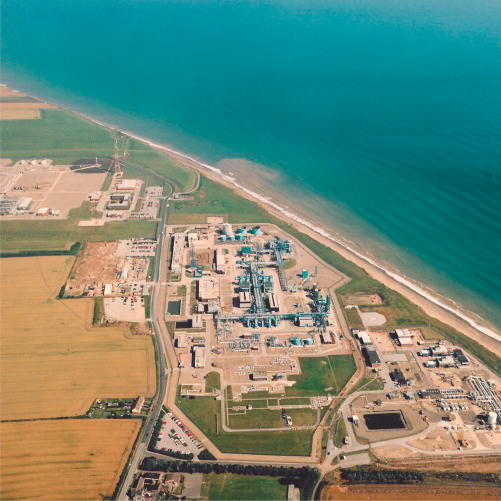
Easington terminal

Easington is the site of a large natural gas terminal, Easington Gas Terminal, consisting of two terminals owned and operated by BP: Centrica Storage which processes and stores gas offshore; and Gassco, operating the Norway to UK Langeled pipeline. In October 2022, Centrica announced that the undersea Rough natural gas storage facility, closed since 2017, was ready for partial re-opening. Since December 2022 the terminal pumps gas to and from the facility, which acts as a reservoir to manage seasonal trends in the supply and demand of gas in the UK.

== See also ==
- Listed buildings in Easington, East Riding of Yorkshire
