= Kilnsea =

Hamlet in the East Riding of Yorkshire, England

Coordinates: 53.620856°N 0.129497°E

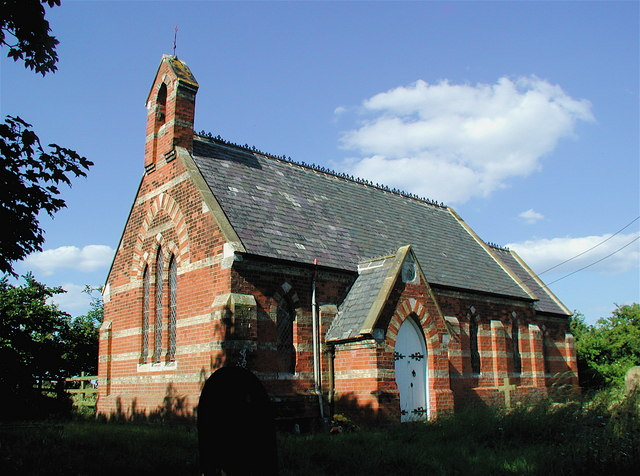
- St Helen's Church, Kilnsea

- Location within the East Riding of Yorkshire
- OS grid reference: TA409159
  - London: 145 mi (233 km) S
- Civil parish: Easington
- Unitary authority: East Riding of Yorkshire
- Ceremonial county: East Riding of Yorkshire
- Region: Yorkshire and the Humber
- Country: England
- Sovereign state: United Kingdom
- Post town: HULL
- Postcode district: HU12
- Dialling code: 01964
- Police: Humberside
- Fire: Humberside
- Ambulance: Yorkshire
- UK Parliament: Beverley and Holderness

Kilnsea is a village in the civil parish of Easington, in the East Riding of Yorkshire, England, in an area known as Holderness. It is situated approximately 2 miles (3 km) south of the village of Easington, on the north bank of the Humber Estuary.

In 1931 the parish had a population of 185. On 1 April 1935 the parish was abolished and merged with Easington.

The name Kilnsea derives from the Old English cylnsǣ meaning 'kiln lake'.

In 1823 Kilnsea was a civil parish in the Wapentake and Liberty of Holderness. The parish church, dedicated to Saint Helen, was close to the cliff and in a "state of dilapidation" and "dangerous condition". Repairs were considered useless with the expectation that the sea, which had already swept away the graveyard, would take the church "in a short time". Population in 1823 was 196.

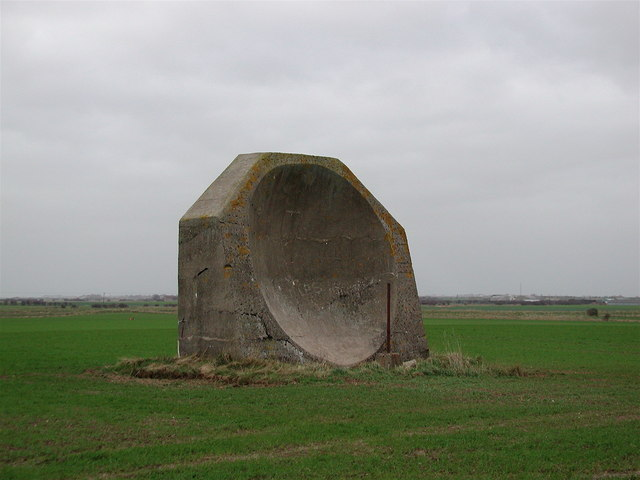
15-foot high (4.6 m) First World War concrete acoustic mirror near Kilnsea.

The old St Helen's Church was lost to the sea in 1826, and was replaced by a new church in 1865, at a cost of £420. The new church incorporated some salvaged remains of the old building. The church was listed as a Grade II building on 14 December 2018.

Kilnsea has one public house, the Crown and Anchor. To the east of Kilnsea is a Grade II listed First World War concrete acoustic mirror used as an early warning device.

== See also ==
- Listed buildings in Easington, East Riding of Yorkshire
