= St Nicholas' Church, Hollym =

Church in Hollym, East Riding of Yorkshire, England

Coordinates: 53°42′23″N 0°02′08″E

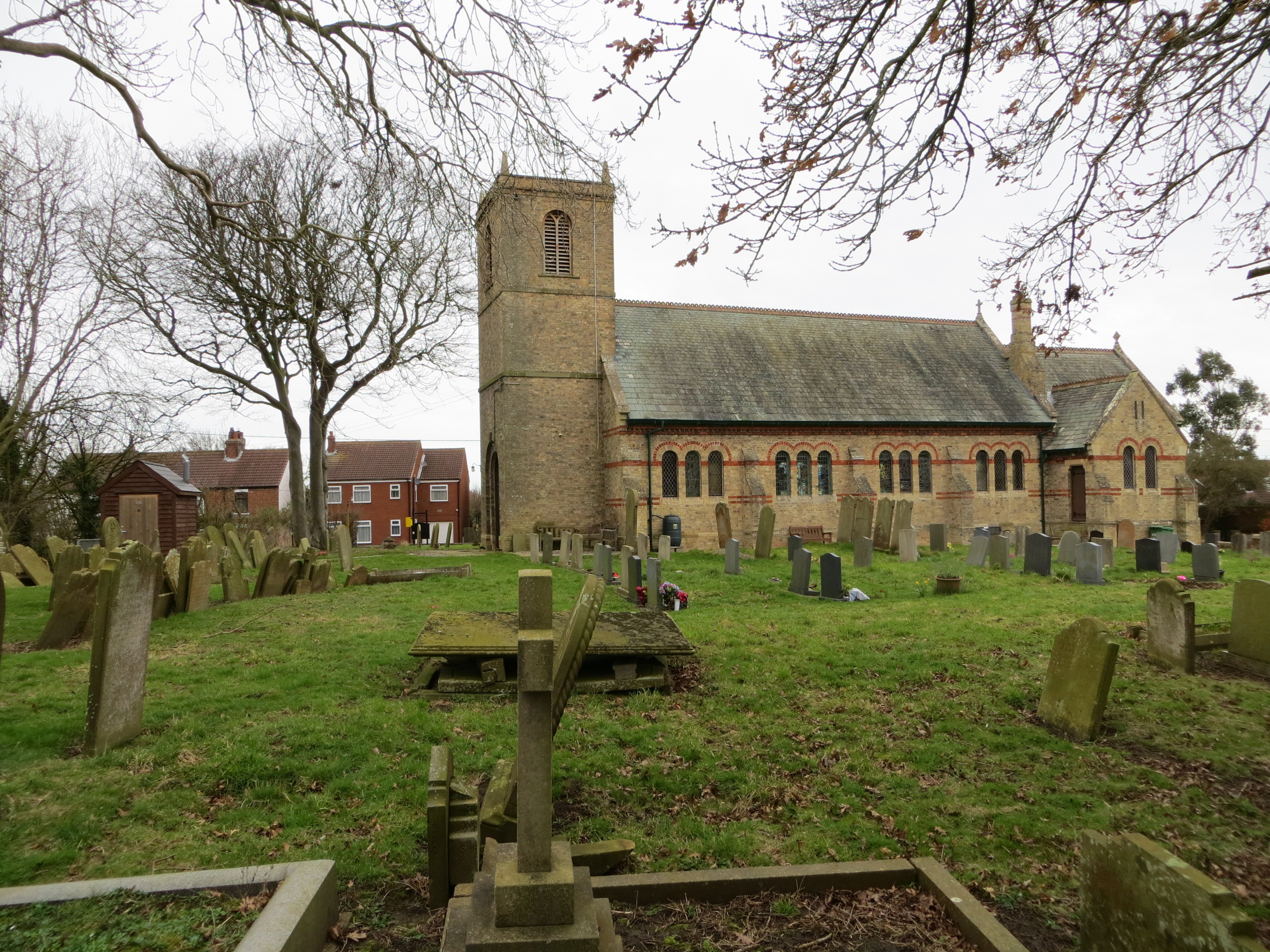
The church, in 2024

St Nicholas' Church is the parish church of Hollym, East Riding of Yorkshire, a village in England.

A chapel of ease to St Nicholas' Church, Withernsea was built in Hollym in the mediaeval period, and it was given tis own parish in 1409. It was demolished and rebuilt in 1814, to a design by William Hutchinson. This church had a nave, chancel and tower, was constructed of light brick, and had round-arched sash windows. In 1884 the body of the church was demolished and rebuilt to a design by James Demaine. The church was grade II listed in 1987.

The tower is built of grey brick, the rest of the church is in yellow brick, with dressings in stone and red brick, and a Westmorland slate roof with crested ridge tiles. The church consists of a nave, a chancel with a south vestry, and a west tower. The tower has three stages, and a round-arched west entrance with a radial fanlight and an inscribed keystone. Above it is a stone string course, a brick band, round-arched bell openings with louvres and Y-tracery, a stepped and dentilled brick cornice, and a coped parapet with plain corner pinnacles. The vestry has an ornate chimney.

== See also ==
- Listed buildings in Hollym, East Riding of Yorkshire
