= Thomas Allen (topographer) =

English topographer

- Born: 1803
- Died: 7 July 1833 (aged 29–30)

Thomas Allen (1803–1833) was an English topographer.

Allen was the son of a map engraver who died of cholera on 7 July 1833.

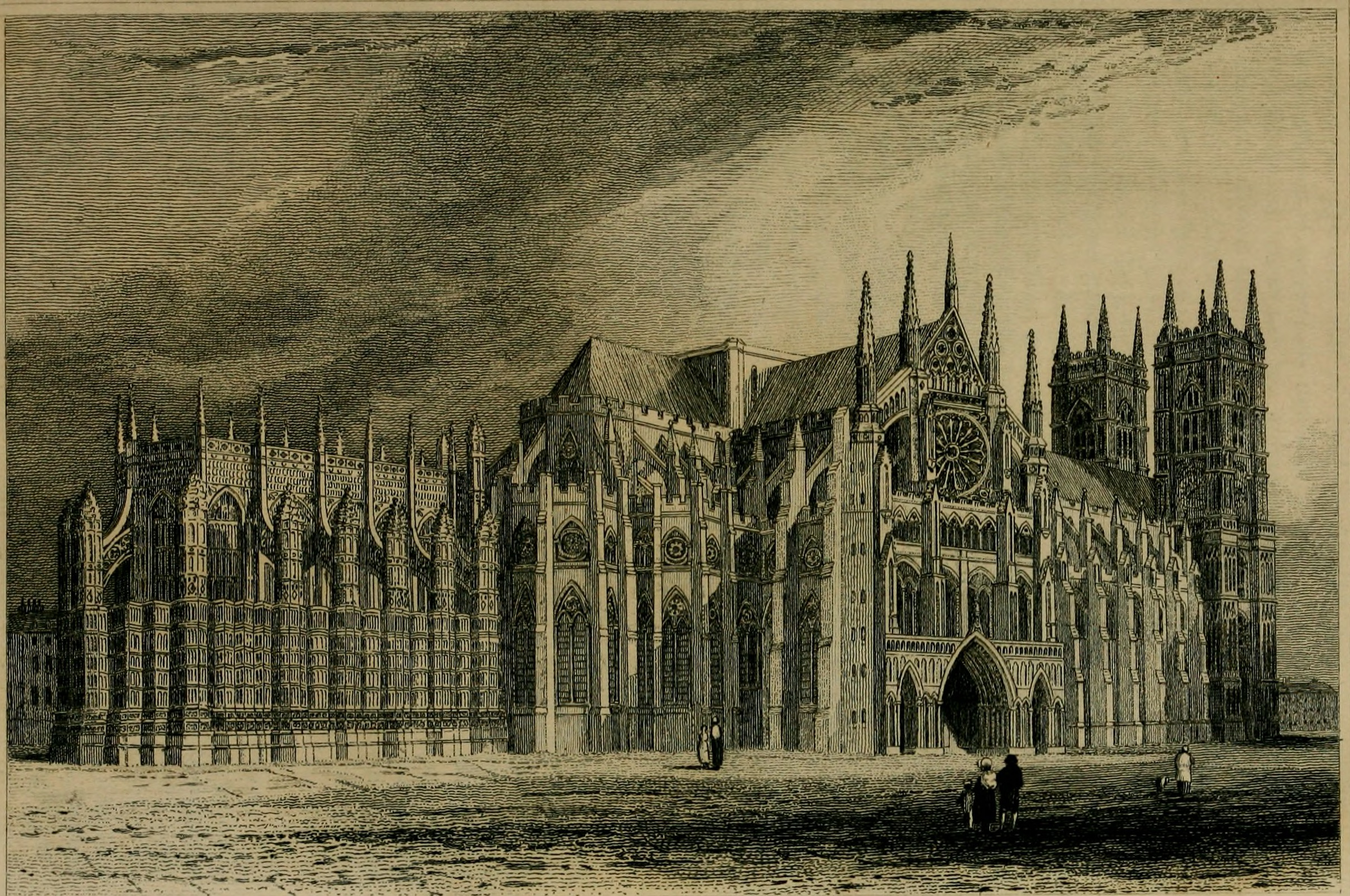
The history and antiquities of London, Westminster, Southwark, and parts adjacent (1837)

== Works ==
In 1827 Allen published a quarto volume, The History and Antiquities of the Parish of Lambeth and the Archiepiscopal Palace, with illustrations, mainly drawn and etched by himself. He later published:

- in parts, the History and Antiquities of London, Westminster, and Southwark (1827 and 1828), illustrated by engravings on copper by himself and woodcuts;
- A New and Complete History of the County of York (1828 to 1831), with engravings after Nathaniel Whittock;
- History of the Counties of Surrey and Sussex (1829 to 1830), with engravings after Whittock;

and he began in 1830 a History of the County of Lincoln, with engravings after his own drawings, which was completed after his death and published in 1834.

Allen also published guide-books to London and the Zoological Gardens, contributed some plates and articles to the Gentleman's Magazine, and projected A Historical and Topographical Atlas of England and Wales, which he did not live to attempt.
