= Hedon =

Town and civil parish in the East Riding of Yorkshire, England

Coordinates: 53°44′22″N 0°11′56″W

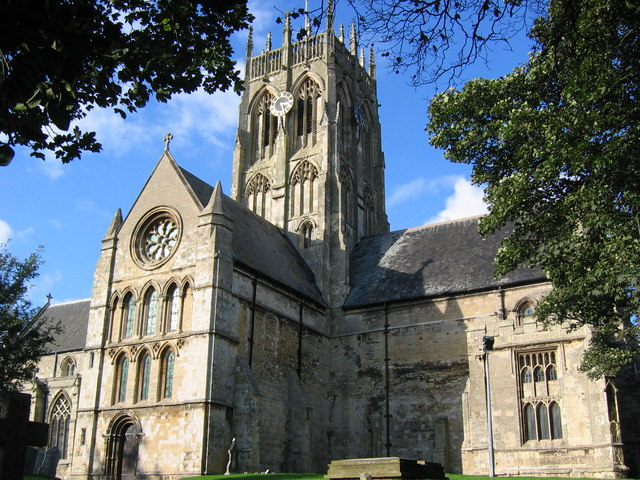
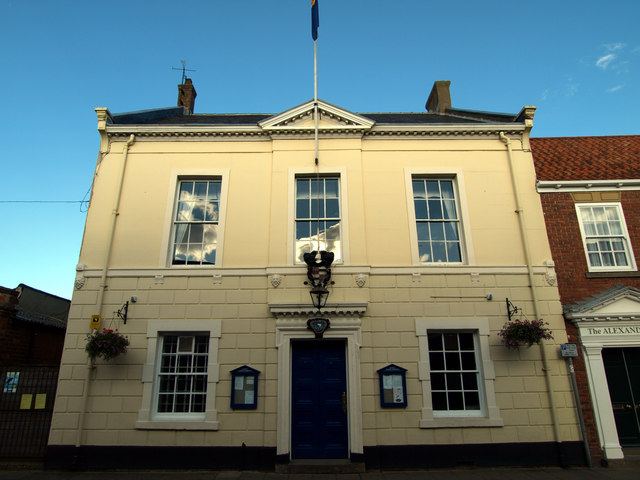
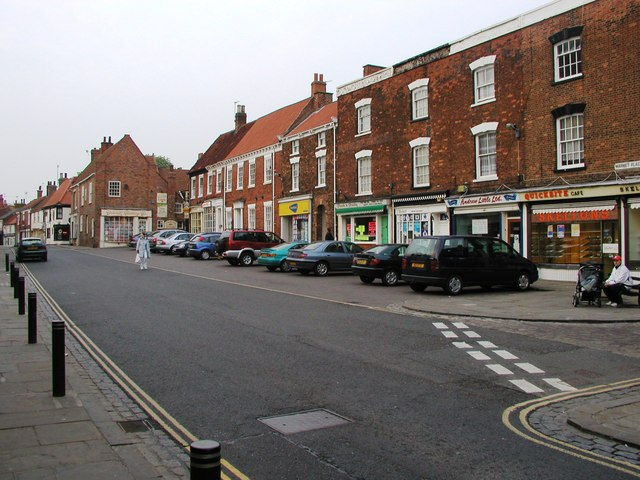
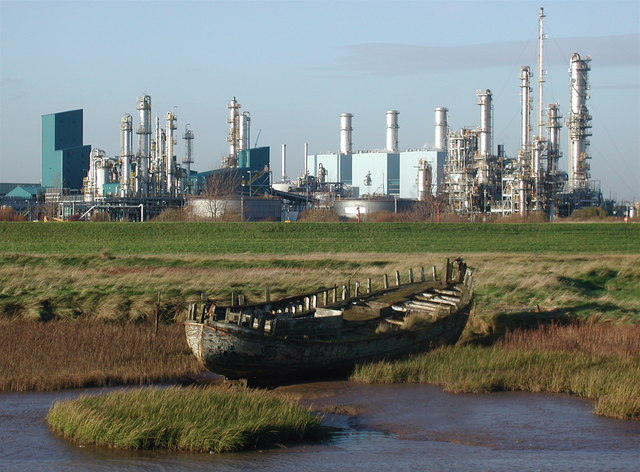
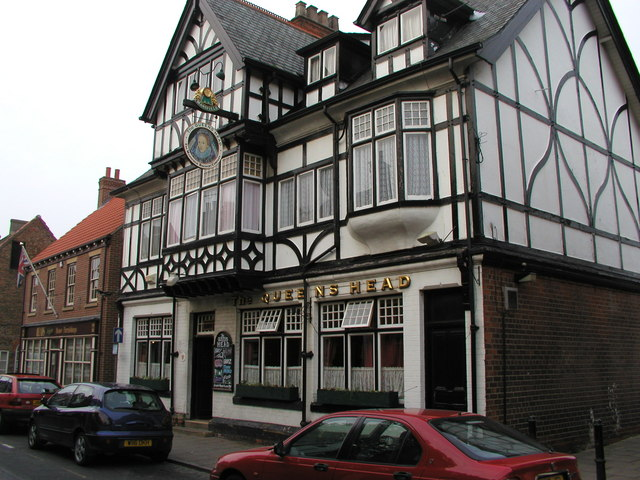
- St Augustine's Hedon Town Hall Hedon High Street Hedon Haven The Queen’s Head

- Location within the East Riding of Yorkshire
- Population: 6,881 (2021 Census)
- OS grid reference: TA190285
- Civil parish: Hedon
- Unitary authority: East Riding of Yorkshire
- Ceremonial county: East Riding of Yorkshire
- Region: Yorkshire and the Humber
- Country: England
- Sovereign state: United Kingdom
- Post town: HULL
- Postcode district: HU12
- Dialling code: 01482
- Police: Humberside
- Fire: Humberside
- Ambulance: Yorkshire
- UK Parliament: Beverley and Holderness

Hedon is a town and civil parish in Holderness in the East Riding of Yorkshire, England. It is situated approximately 5 miles (8 km) east of Hull city centre. It lies to the north of the A1033 road at the crossroads of the B1240 and B1362 roads. It is particularly noted for the parish church of St. Augustine, known as the 'King of Holderness', which is a Grade I listed building.

At the 2021 census, the parish had a population of 6,881, a decrease from the 2011 UK census figure of 7,100,

== History ==
The name Hedon is derived from the Old English hǣðdūn meaning 'heather hill'.

Hedon is not mentioned in the Domesday Book which leads to the belief that it was a new town created by the Normans as a port. Hedon was at its most prosperous in the 12th and 13th centuries and at one time was the 11th largest port in England. The decline of the port came with the development of the port of Hull and the building of larger ships which were unable to get up the small river to Hedon.

Hedon was given its first charter by Henry II in 1158 and was granted improved ones by King John in 1200 and Henry III in 1248 and 1272. Edward III granted the most important charter which gave the town the right to elect a mayor.

In 1415 Hedon was granted an important charter, which let the town have burgesses and other ministers and also gave the town a mace. This mace, held in Hedon Town Hall, is now the oldest surviving mace in the country, and is clearly a weapon of war.

The town was a parliamentary borough until it was disenfranchised under the Reform Act 1832. It still enjoyed its borough status granted by its charters until 1974 when it was removed in a reorganisation of local government.

To the west of the town, on the Twyers Estate, was a racecourse. The course staged its first meeting on 24 August 1888, with Prince Albert Victor, Duke of Clarence and Avondale in attendance on the second day, and racing continued until 1895. The racecourse was re-opened in 1906 but closed permanently after racing on 11 September 1909. After closing it was developed into an aerodrome officially opened in 1929 by Prince George, Duke of Kent. It was the arrival point of Hull-born aviator Amy Johnson on her record-breaking solo flight to Australia in 1930, where she began a triumphant homecoming. After ten years of operation, the aerodrome closed during Second World War, 1939–1945. Afterward, the site was briefly used as a motorcycle speedway track. Attempts were made in the late-1950s to reopen it for flying, which failed, and the land has been used as grazing for cattle. A plaque commemorating the memory of the airfield was installed at the nearby Kingstown Hotel in July 2017.

The Hull and Holderness Railway opened in 1854 which ran from Victoria Dock in Hull to Withernsea, through Hedon. The station was built to the north of the town and it proved a vital part of Hedon's transport system for a century. In 1965 Hedon lost its passenger service when British Railways appointed Lord Beeching to stop losses, and closed branch lines not making a profit. The line from Hull as far as Hedon remained open for goods until 1968.

Hedon became the subject of national media attention in August 2000 when a freak mini-tornado in the Humber Estuary caused flash floods and hailstones to drop on parts of the town.

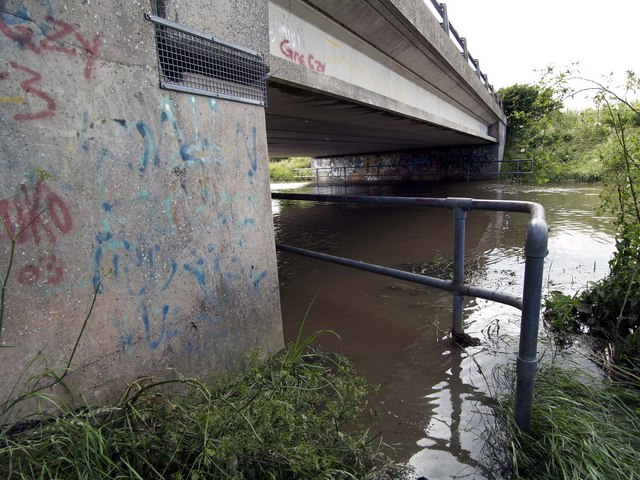
Burstwick Drain

Hedon was also affected by the widespread floods that occurred in the UK in the summer of 2007; areas affected included the Inmans / Westlands Estates and most areas near the Burstwick drain. A nearby village, Burstwick, saw the most homes flooded in the East Riding of Yorkshire.

There have been plans to create a country park around the Hedon Haven, south of the town. There is an open-air concrete skate park in the south of the town between Draper's Lane and the Burstwick Drain.

== Controversy ==
In late 2023, following a growing pattern in East Yorkshire by communication providers intending to provide their own services via their own individual infrastructure, wooden poles to provide internet connections to Hedon were erected on behalf of MS3 Networks. Changes to the law from April 2022 meant planning consent was not needed.

In early 2024, some poles were identified by Historic England to be in violation of the required scheduled monument consent, a criminal offence, as the area was considered to have Scheduled Monument status. MS3 Networks' CEO stated their services could save residents "...more than £1m per year". Previously in late 2023, MS3 poles in the Longhill area of Hull were felled by unknown members of the public, after protests by residents unhappy with the new poles.

== Notable people ==
- Dorothy Marion Campbell, English potter
- Sir Alexander Campbell, Canadian statesman and politician, and a father of Canadian Confederation
- Mezzo-soprano singer Amy Black (1973–2009) was born and educated in Hedon and is now buried in the cemetery

== See also ==
- Listed buildings in Hedon
