= EastRider =

Network of long-distance bus routes in East and North Yorkshire, England

- An EastRider X46-branded Alexander Dennis Enviro400 MMC in Beverley

Overview
- Operator: East Yorkshire
- Began service: 10 August 2020; 6 years ago

Routes
- Routes: 9
- Locale: East Riding of Yorkshire; North Yorkshire
- Communities served: Bridlington; Beverley; Gilberdyke; Goole; Hornsea; Kingston upon Hull; Withernsea; York
- Termini: Hull Paragon Interchange

Service
- Operates: Monday to Saturday/Sunday
- Some EastRider services do not run on Sundays

EastRider is the brand name given to a network of long-distance bus services across the East Riding of Yorkshire and North Yorkshire, operated by Go-Ahead Group company East Yorkshire. The EastRider services, all operating from Kingston upon Hull, serve the destinations of Bridlington, Goole, Hornsea, Withernsea and York using a fleet of specially-branded high-specification buses.

== Current routes ==
=== X45/X46/X47 ===
The X46 and the X47 run from Hull Paragon Interchange to York railway station via the A1079, calling at Beverley, Market Weighton and Pocklington. Both routes depart Hull Interchange and follow Beverley Road and Hull Road, the latter serving Dunswell and Woodmansey before entering Beverley to serve the town's bus station. Both routes are interworked to create a half-hour frequency of buses to Hull and York. Prior to service changes on 2 April 2023, the X47 called at the University of Hull and the villages of Cottingham and Bentley before rejoining the X46 along Beverley's Victoria Road. On 11 November 2024, a new variant of the X46 and X47, numbered X45 and running between Market Weighton and York via Pocklington and Dunnington, was launched.

The X46 and X47 services, as well as services 45 and 46, were the first East Yorkshire bus services to be upgraded to EastRider specification, receiving a fleet of eight Alexander Dennis Enviro400 MMC double-decker buses in August 2020 specified with bicycle carriers in the lower deck, audio-visual next-stop announcements voiced by Emma Hignett, and USB and wireless chargers. The relaunched services were launched on 10 August 2020. The original buses were replaced by a fleet of eleven new Enviro400 MMCs acquired from dealer stock in August 2026; these buses are to be eventually refurbished to a similar specification to the old buses, however they will not be equipped with bicycle carriers.

Prior to the relaunch of the X46 and 46 as EastRider routes, the service was operated by a route-branded fleet of MCV EvoSeti-bodied Volvo B5TLs, which were debranded and redeployed throughout the fleet upon the arrival of the Enviro400 MMCs, and an ex-demonstrator fleet of two Enviro400MMCs and Wright Gemini 3-bodied Volvo B5TLs, which were transferred to Go North East.

In March 2011, the X4, a short variant of the X46 that ran between Market Weighton and York via the A1079, bypassing Pocklington, was launched. Branded as the 'Wicstun Express' in reference to the historical name of Market Weighton, the service made use of one route-branded vehicle. The Wicstun Express was withdrawn on 20 May 2017 due to low passenger numbers.

=== X7/75 ===
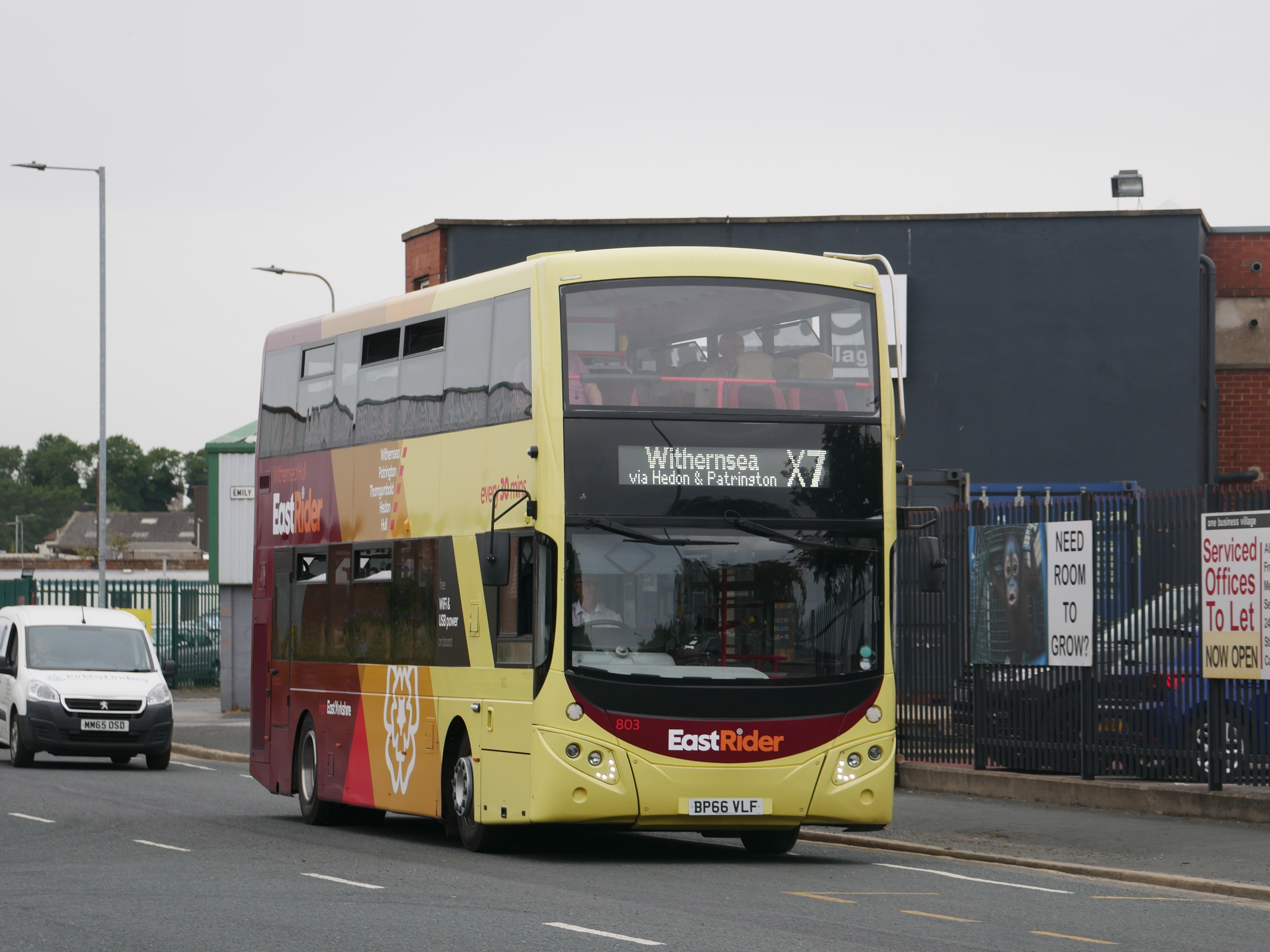
An MCV EvoSeti-bodied Volvo B5TL operating service X7 on Hedon Road, Kingston upon Hull

The X7 and the 75 both run from Hull Paragon Interchange to Withernsea via the A1033, calling at Hedon, Thorngumbald, Keyingham and Patrington. Both routes were launched in 2021, replacing routes 76 and 77 along the Hull-to-Withernsea corridor. Service 75 departs Hull Interchange and heads onto the A1033 via Holderness Road and Southcoates Lane; Service X7 bypasses both roads and runs via Hedon Road for the A1033. Both services then leave the A1033 to stop at Hedon before rejoining the road for Thorngumbald, where they then split again; while service 75 leaves the road to serve the village of Burstwick, service X7 stays to bypass Burstwick and serve Ryehill. The 75 and X7 then rejoin and serve the villages of Keyingham, Ottringham, Patrington and Hollym before arriving at Withernsea.

The service is operated mainly using a fleet of refurbished MCV EvoSeti-bodied Volvo B5TL double-deckers, which were originally delivered for use on the Hull-to-Withernsea corridor in January 2017.

Services 75, 76 and 77 were first upgraded and relaunched by East Yorkshire in November 1995 as one of two 'Classic Line' corridors operated by the company. The routes made use of ten dual-purpose and route-branded Alexander Royale and Northern Counties Palatine II bodied Volvo Olympians equipped with air suspension and improved seating, which were operated on a revised timetable and driven by 28 drivers that had taken a three-day customer care training programme.

=== 24/43 ===
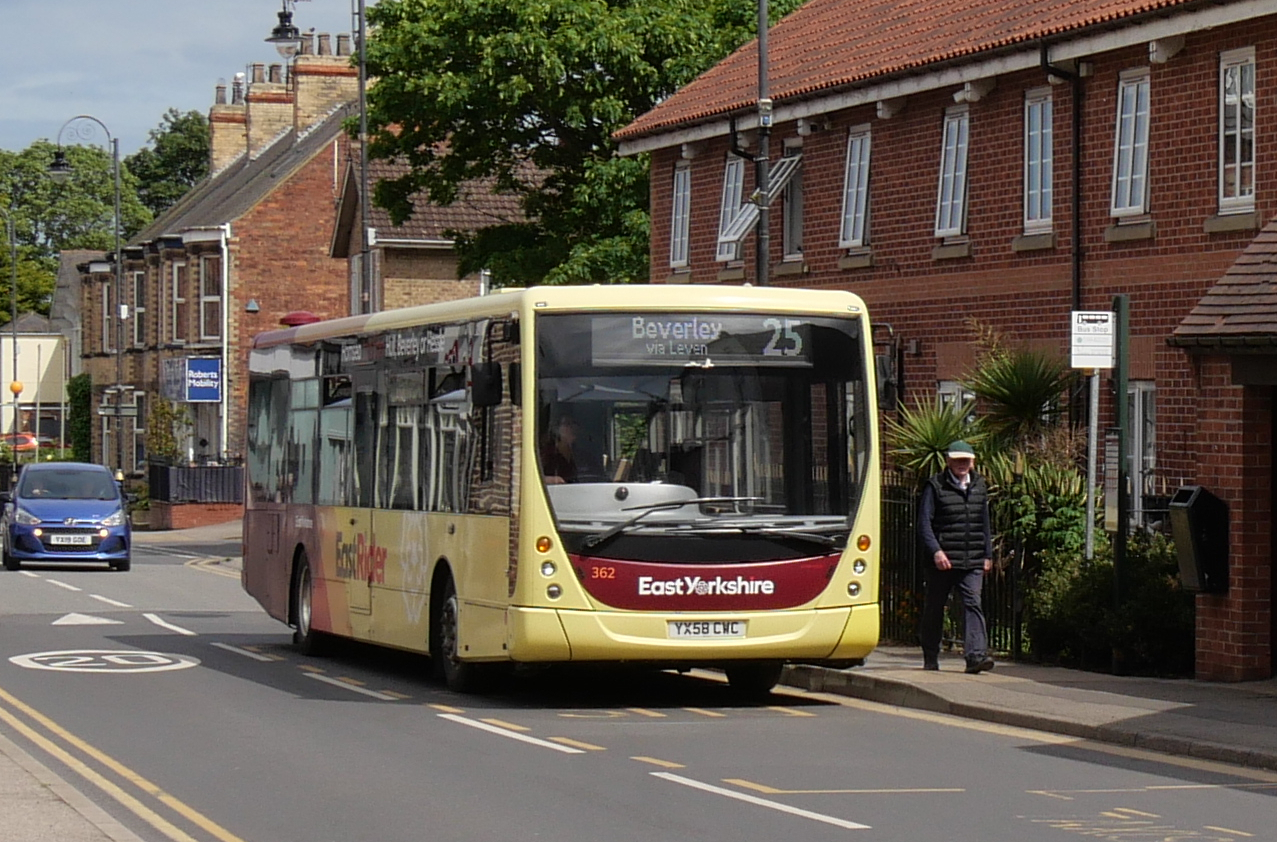
Plaxton Centro-bodied Volvo B7RLE operating service 25 in Hornsea

Services 24 and 43 are two services that run from Hull Paragon Interchange and Hessle to Beverley and Hornsea, which commenced operations on 5 September 2021, replacing services 240, 246 and 80. The two services are operated mainly using a fleet of refurbished Plaxton Centro-bodied Volvo B7RLE single-deck buses.

Service 24, formerly numbered 240, runs from Hull Paragon Interchange to Hornsea via Witham and Holderness Road, the A165 and the A1035, calling at Coniston, Skirlaugh, Long Riston, Brandesburton and Sigglesthorne.

Service 43, formerly numbered 23, is a cut-down version of the former 246 route, running from Hull Paragon Interchange to Beverley bus station via Beverley Road.

=== 41 ===
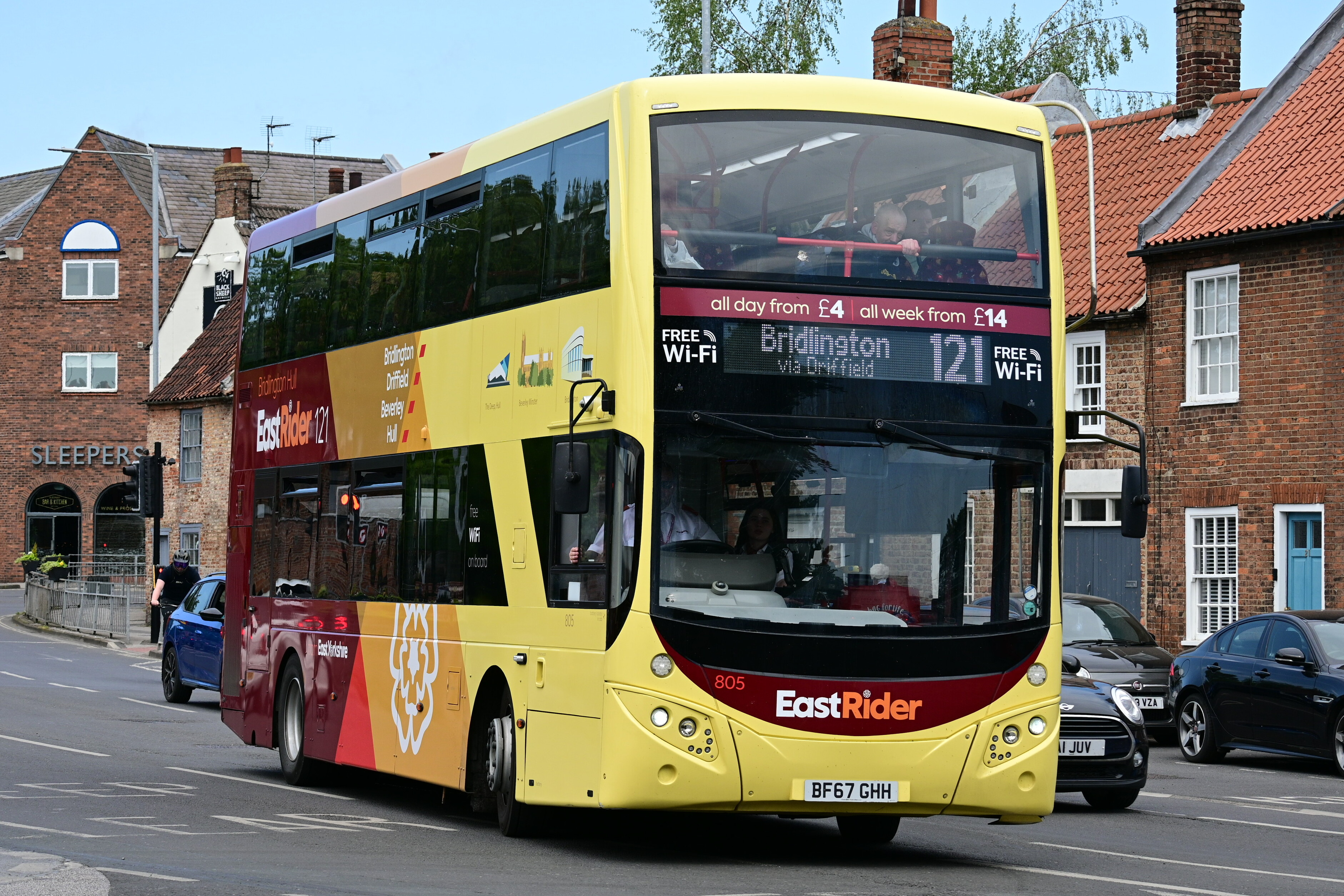
An MCV EvoSeti-bodied Volvo B5TL operating service 121 in Beverley

The 41, formerly known as the 121, runs from Hull Paragon Interchange to Bridlington via the A164 and the A614, calling at Beverley, and Driffield. The route follows Beverley Road out of Hull and serves the villages of Dunswell and Woodmansey before stopping at Beverley, then continues north out of Beverley along the A164 to serve Molescroft, Leconfield and Hutton Cranswick before stopping again at Driffield. The route continues along the A614 to serve Nafferton, Burton Agnes and Carnaby before arriving at Bridlington bus station.

From 10 November 2024, as part of a major series of service changes on the East Yorkshire bus network, the 121 was renumbered to the 41 and amended to run direct to Hull Interchange via Beverley Road instead of through the city centre via Carr Lane, although the rest of the route and the EastRider branding were retained.

When branded as the 121, the service was upgraded in December 1995 to use a fleet of six dual-purpose Alexander Royale bodied Volvo Olympians as the second of two 'Classic Line' corridors, operated by 30 drivers that had taken a three-day customer care training programme. After the 'Classic Line' branding was dropped, the 121, alongside the X46, later received a batch of MCV EvoSeti-bodied Volvo B5TL double-deckers in 2017, which also featured branding for the route. Four of these were repainted and refurbished to EastRider specification for continued use on the route in 2022.

Before 2018, the 121 continued along the A165 and served the seaside communities of Primrose Valley, Filey and Cayton before ending at Scarborough. However, this section was split off into route 12 on 6 May 2018, with the 121 having ended at Bridlington bus station since. East Yorkshire claimed that the route's long length made keeping to its timetables challenging, especially in busy summer periods, due to delays caused by traffic congestion, accidents and roadworks.

=== 55 ===
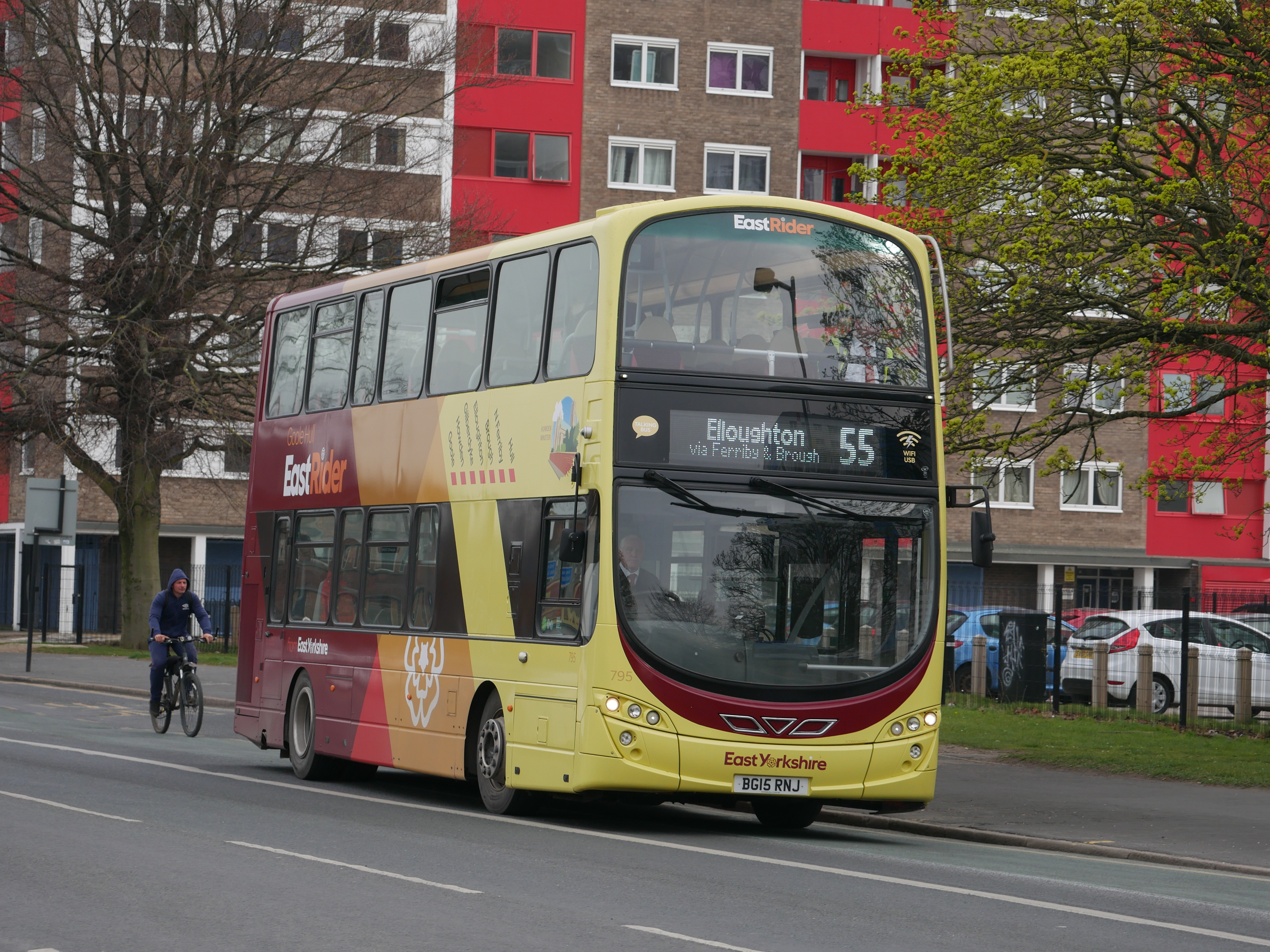
Wright Eclipse Gemini 2-bodied Volvo B9TL operating service 55 on Anlaby Road, Kingston upon Hull

The 55 runs on Mondays to Saturdays from Hull Paragon Interchange to Gilberdyke and Goole, running parallel to the A63 and the M62 motorway and serving the communities of North Ferriby and South Ferriby, Brough, Elloughton, North Cave and South Cave, with the two-hourly extension to Goole also serving Howden. The service was launched in January 2021, replacing the 155, and is operated mainly using a fleet of refurbished Wright Eclipse Gemini 2 bodied Volvo B9TL double-deckers.

Service 55 was announced to be withdrawn as part of the April 2022 service cuts to the East Yorkshire network. A replacement service was launched by East Riding of Yorkshire Council in April 2022, with the route also remaining with East Yorkshire, albeit with the Gilberdyke to Goole section reduced to a two-hour frequency.

== Former routes ==
=== X5 ===
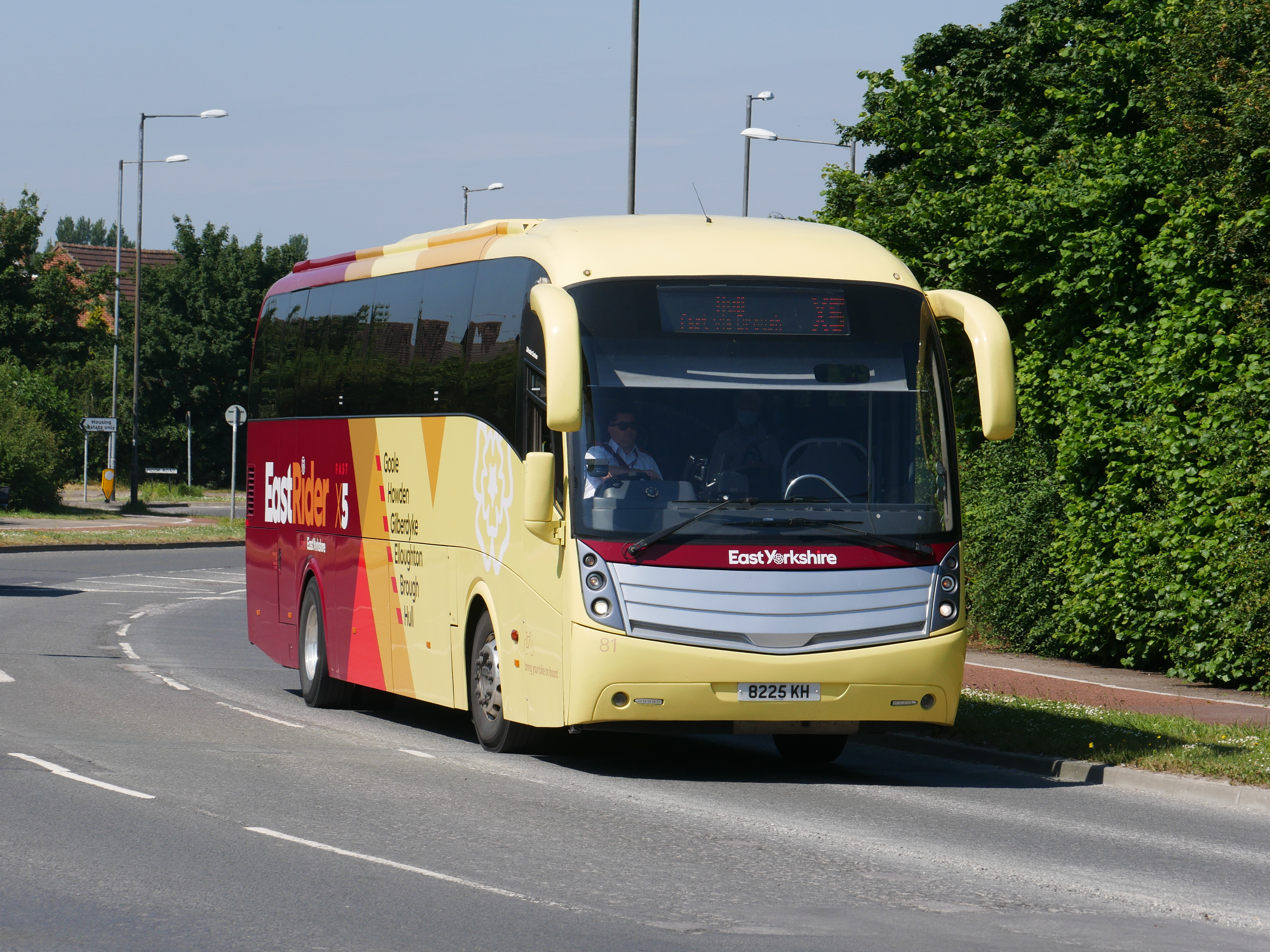
Caetano Levante-bodied Volvo B9R operating service X5 in Brough

The X5 was an express variant of the 55 which ran from Hull Paragon Interchange to Goole via the A63 from January 2021 to April 2022. The service, which ran five times a day Monday to Friday and four times on Saturdays, was operated by a single refurbished Caetano Levante coach.

As a result of low patronage, the X5 was withdrawn in April 2022 as part of service cuts across the East Yorkshire bus network.

=== 25 ===
Service 25, launched alongside the 23 and 24 EastRider services from 5 September 2021, ran from Hessle to Hornsea via Anlaby, Cottingham, East Riding of Yorkshire and Beverley, calling at Willerby, Bentley, Tickton and Routh before joining the route of the 24 at Leven. Some services also ran only between Beverley and Hornsea.

In October 2024, it was announced that as part of a major series of service changes on the East Yorkshire bus network, service 25 was to be formally split into two services, with the 25 running only between Beverley and Hornsea with additional early evening services while a new 26 took on the Hessle to Beverley section of the route. The EastRider single-deck vehicles allocated to the 25 were reallocated elsewhere in the East Yorkshire network.

=== 45/46 ===
Service 46 originally ran from Market Weighton or Holme on Spalding Moor to York via the A1079, following the route of the X46. On evenings, the service became the 45 and operates a single journey from Bridlington to York and back via the A614 and A1079, calling at Carnaby, Driffield, Bainton and Middleton on the Wolds before continuing to York along the A1079. These services also gained EastRider-branded Alexander Dennis Enviro400 MMCs in August 2020.

Service 45 originally ran from Bridlington to York via Driffield and Market Weighton, with three EastRider buses branded for this service. In March 2022, however, it was announced that the 45 was to be withdrawn in April as part of a number of service cuts to the East Yorkshire network, resulting from a drop in bus ridership caused by the COVID-19 pandemic. Three replacement services, all tendered to East Yorkshire and using EastRider buses, were launched by East Riding of Yorkshire Council on 10 April to replace the withdrawn bus services: a shorter 45 and the 46 replaced the York to Market Weighton section of the route, while the new service 145 replaced the Market Weighton to Bridlington section.

In March 2023, it was again announced that services 45 and 46 were to be cut, with the 45 to be withdrawn entirely and the 46 being shortened to serve only Market Weighton and Holme on Spalding Moor from 2 April. These routes were replaced by the X46 and the X47, which are to run parallel with each other to create a 30-minute frequency from Hull to York on Mondays through to Saturdays.
