= East Riding County League =

Association football league in England

- Founded: 1902
- Divisions: Premier; divisions one through five
- No. of teams: 68
- Country: England
- Feeder to: Humber Premier League
- Website: full-time.thefa.com/Table.do?divisionseason=3633377

The East Riding County League is a football competition based in England. It has a total of six divisions including the East Riding County League Premier Division which is a feeder to the Humber Premier League. For the 2018–19 season, the league decided to operate with just six divisions, losing division six and merging the remaining teams from that division to the remaining divisions.

At the AGM of the Humber Premier League it was decided that, for the 2023-24 season, Division One of the Humber Premier League would be merged with the Premier Division of the East Riding County League to create a feeder division for the HPL.

== Member clubs 2024–25 ==
=== Premiership Division ===
Club	Home ground
Bridlington Rovers Millau	Bridlington Sports Centre, Bridlington
Bridlington Town Reserves	The Mounting Systems Stadium, Bridlington
Easington United	Easington Recreation and Sports Ground, Easington
Filey Town	Filey Playing Fields, Filey
Goole United	Goole Town Cricket Club, Goole
Great Driffield Rovers	Allotment Lane Playing Field, Driffield
Hedon Rangers Reserves	Holderness Academy 3G, Preston
Holme Rovers	Holme on Spalding Moor Playing Fields, Holme on Spalding Moor
North Cave	North Cave Playing Fields, North Cave
North Ferriby Development	the Dransfield Stadium, North Ferriby
Sculcoates Amateurs Academy	Hull and East Riding Sports Club, Hull
South Cave United Reserves	Baysgarth School 3G, Barton-upon-Humber

=== Championship North ===
Club	Home ground
Bridlington Rovers Reserves	Bridlington Sports Centre 3G, Bridlington
Bridlington Spa	Bridlington Sports Centre 3G, Bridlington
Edgehill	George Pindar School, Eastfield
Flamborough	Woodcock Memorial Playing Field, Flamborough
Langtoft	Burton Agnes Playing Field, Burton Agnes
Market Weighton Town	The Market Weighton School 3G, Market Weighton
Newby	Scarborough TEC, Scarborough
Newlands Park Hotel	Sherburn Playing Field, Sherburn
Scalby	Scalby Cricket and Football Club, Scalby
Seamer Sports	Pasture Lane, Seamer

=== Championship South ===
Club	Home ground
AFC Bilton	Malet Lambert School 3G, Hull
Beverley Town Thirds	Beverley Leisure Centre, Beverley
Costello	Costello Playing Fields, Hull
Elloughton Blackburn	Blackburn Sports & Leisure Club, Brough
Hessle Sporting Club Reserves	King George V Playing Field, Hessle
Hodgsons	Beverley Leisure Centre, Beverley
Hull Athletic	Hull University Grass Pitch, Hull
Kingfields FC	Bishop Burton College, Bishop Burton
Leven Members Club	Leven Playing Field and Sports Hall, Leven
Springhead	Springhead Avenue Playing Fields, Hull

=== Division One ===
Club	Home ground
AFC North	The RWB Playing Field, Bransholme
Beverley Town Development	Leconfield Recreation Club, Beverley
Bridlington Rovers 1903	Bridlington Sports Centre, Bridlington
Easington United Reserves	Easington Recreation and Sports Ground, Easington
East Riding Rangers Reserves	King George V Playing Fields, Cottingham
Gilberdyke Phoenix	Ings View Sports Fields, Gilberdyke
Hessle Rangers Juniors	Wolfreton High School, Hull
Humber Colts FC	Leconfield Recreation Club, Leconfield
Northside Sporting FC	Costello Playing Fields, Hull
Reckitts AFC Reserves	Hull University 3G, Hull
South Park Rangers	South Park Playing Field, Goole
Thorpe Park Rangers	Sir Henry Cooper Playing Fields, Hull

=== Division Two ===
Club	Home ground
AFC Skirlaugh	Skirlaugh Playing Fields, Skirlaugh
AFC Three Tuns	Riley South Playing Fields, Hull
Bridlington Rovers Pandas	Bridlington Sports Centre 3G, Bridlington
Driffield Town	Hutton Cranswick Sports Recreation Ground, Hutton Cranswick
Eastside	St Johns Grove Playing Fields, Hull
Goole United AFC Academy	West Park, Goole
Great Driffield AFC Development	Hutton Cranswick Sports Recreation Ground, Hutton Cranswick
Holme Rovers Reserves	Holme on Spalding Moor Playing Fields, Holme on Spalding Moor
Hornsea Town Reserves	Hollis Recreation Ground, Hornsea
Leven Members Club Reserves	Leven Playing Field and Sports Hall, Leven
Robin AFC	Malet Lambert School 3G, Hull

=== Division Three ===
Club	Home ground
AFC Tickton	Longcroft School, Molescroft
Brandesburton AFC Academy	Catwick Lane, Brandesburton
Easington United Thirds	Easington Recreation and Sports Ground, Easington
East Yorkshire United	Holderness Academy, Preston
Gilberdyke Phoenix Reserves	Ings View Sports Fields, Gilberdyke
Hedon Rangers Academy	Eastside, Saltend
Kingswood United	Kingswood Academy 3G, Hull
Priory FC	Pride Park, Hull
Wareham Forest AFC	St Mary's College 4G, Hull
Withernsea United	Withernsea High School, Withernsea

=== Division Four ===
Club	Home ground
AFC Eastfield	Eastway Sports and Social Club, Scarborough
Aldbrough United	Aldbrough Playing Fields, Aldbrough
Bishop Wilton	Bishop Wilton Village Hall, Bishop Wilton
Cross Keys	Steve Prescott Sports Centre, Hull
Filey Town Development	Filey Playing Fields, Filey
Greenwood Athletic	Costello Playing Fields, Hull
Pocklington Town Fourths	Henry Thirsk Amenity Centre, Pocklington
Sporting Club Hull	King George V Playing Fields, Hull
Market Weighton Town Reserves	The Market Weighton School 3G, Market Weighton
Wareham Forest United	Sirius Academy West, Hull

== Champions ==
Premier Division

- 2008–09 – Howden Amateurs
- 2009–10 – Hodgsons
- 2010–11 – Driffield Evening Institute
- 2011–12 – Little Weighton
- 2012–13 – Wawne United
- 2013–14 – AFC Rovers
- 2014–15 – Wawne United Reserves
- 2015–16 – Bridlington Town Reserves
- 2016–17 – North Ferriby United Academy
- 2017–18 – Beverley Town Reserves
- 2018–19 – Reckitts Reserves
- 2019–20 - Season abandoned due to COVID-19 pandemic
- 2020–21 - Season abandoned due to COVID-19 pandemic
- 2021–22 - Holme Rovers
- 2022–23 - Hessle Rangers Juniors

Division One

- 2008–09 – Beverley Town Reserves
- 2009–10 – AFC Rovers
- 2010–11 – Little Weighton
- 2011–12 – Bridlington Town Academy
- 2012–13 – Wawne United Reserves
- 2013–14 – Gilberdyke Phoenix
- 2014–15 – Bridlington Albion
- 2015–16 – AFC Orchard
- 2016–17 – Queens County
- 2017–18 – Harchester United
- 2018–19 – West Hull Amateurs
- 2019–20 - Season abandoned due to COVID-19 pandemic
- 2020–21 - Season abandoned due to COVID-19 pandemic
- 2021–22 - Pelican Rangers
- 2022–23 - Hodgson

Division Two

- 2008–09 – Trades and Labour Club
- 2009–10 – Hedon Rangers Reserves
- 2010–11 – Wawne United Reserves
- 2011–12 – Haltemprice Rangers
- 2012–13 – Leven Members Club
- 2013–14 – Lord Nelson
- 2014–15 – West Hull Amateurs
- 2015–16 – Hutton Cranswick SRA
- 2016–17 – Harchester United
- 2017–18 – Reckitts Reserves
- 2018–19 – Hessle Rangers Reserves
- 2019–20 - Season abandoned due to COVID-19 pandemic
- 2020–21 - Season abandoned due to COVID-19 pandemic
- 2021–22 - Langtoft
- 2022–23 - Bridlington Rovers Millau

Division Three

- 2008–09 – Cliffe
- 2009–10 – Wawne United Reserves
- 2010–11 – Haltemprice Rangers
- 2011–12 – Viking Raiders Reserves
- 2012–13 – Middleton Rovers
- 2013–14 – Newland St John's
- 2014–15 – Hutton Cranswick SRA
- 2015–16 – AFC North
- 2016–17 – AFC Gulls
- 2017–18 – Apollo Rangers
- 2018–19 – Chaos United
- 2019–20 - Season abandoned due to COVID-19 pandemic
- 2020–21 - Season abandoned due to COVID-19 pandemic
- 2021–22 - Bridlington Spa
- 2022–23 - Market Weighton Town

Division Four

- 2008–09 – Waterloo
- 2009–10 – Haltemprice Rangers
- 2010–11 – Market Weighton United Reserves
- 2011–12 – Skirlaugh Reserves
- 2012–13 – FC Ridings
- 2013–14 – Gilberdyke Phoenix Reserves
- 2014–15 – Waterloo
- 2015–16 – Withernsea
- 2016–17 – Hedon Rangers Thirds
- 2017–18 – Hessle Rangers Reserves
- 2018–19 – AFC Gulls
- 2019–20 - Season abandoned due to COVID-19 pandemic
- 2020–21 - Season abandoned due to COVID-19 pandemic
- 2021–22 - Bridlington Rovers Millau
- 2022–23 - AFC Skirlaugh

Division Five

- 2008–09 – Haltemprice Rangers
- 2009–10 – AFC Woodlands Reserves
- 2010–11 – Long Riston Thirds
- 2011–12 – Easington United Casuals
- 2012–13 – Bluebell Nafferton
- 2013–14 – Market Weighton United
- 2014–15 – Wawne United Fourths
- 2015–16 – Hedon Rangers Thirds
- 2016–17 – Patrington
- 2017–18 – Chaos United
- 2018–19 – Souths AFC
- 2019–20 - Season abandoned due to COVID-19 pandemic
- 2020–21 - Season abandoned due to COVID-19 pandemic
- 2021–22 - AAK S&S
- 2022–23 - Robin

Division Six

- 2012–13 – Waterloo
- 2013–14 – No Division
- 2014–15 – No Division
- 2015–16 – Brandesburton Reserves
- 2016–17 – Marist Rovers
- 2017–18 – South Park Academy
- 2020–21 - Season abandoned due to COVID-19 pandemic
- 2021–22 - Northside Sporting
