= Hedon Racecourse railway station =

Disused railway station in the East Riding of Yorkshire, England

Hedon Racecourse
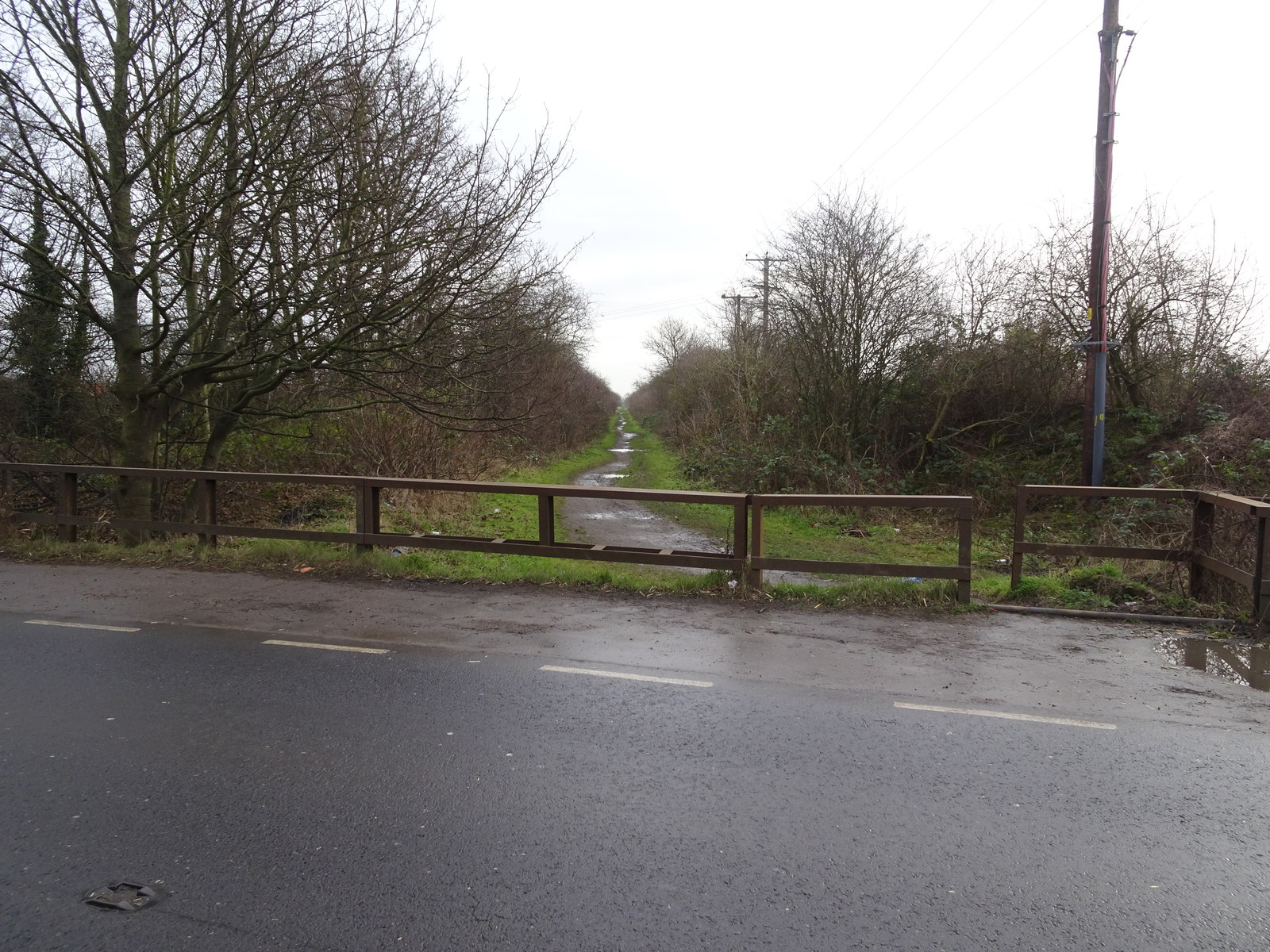
- Site of the former station (2018)

General information
- Location: Salt End, East Riding of Yorkshire; England
- Coordinates: 53.748000°N 0.226500°W
- Grid reference: TA169294
- Platforms: 2

Other information
- Status: Disused

History
- Original company: Hull and Holderness Railway
- Pre-grouping: North Eastern Railway
- Post-grouping: London and North Eastern Railway

Key dates
- 1888: Opened
- 1909: Closed
- 1948: Re-opened
- 1948: Closed
Location

Hedon Racecourse railway station is a disused railway station on the North Eastern Railway's Hull and Holderness Railway to the west of Hedon in the East Riding of Yorkshire, England. It was opened by the North Eastern Railway on 24 August 1888 to serve the newly opened Hedon Park Racecourse. The station was not timetabled and only operated on race days. The station was closed in 1909 when horse racing was terminated.

The station was briefly re-opened as Hedon Halt between 14 August 1948 and 23 October 1948 to serve speedway meetings at the newly constructed Hedon Stadium.

Preceding station	Disused railways	Following station
Marfleet	North Eastern Railway; Hull and Holderness Railway	Hedon
