= Hedon Aerodrome =

Former Royal Air Force base in Yorkshire, England

Hedon Aerodrome
- RAF Hull; RAF Hedon
- Preston, East Riding of Yorkshire; Near Kingston upon Hull in England
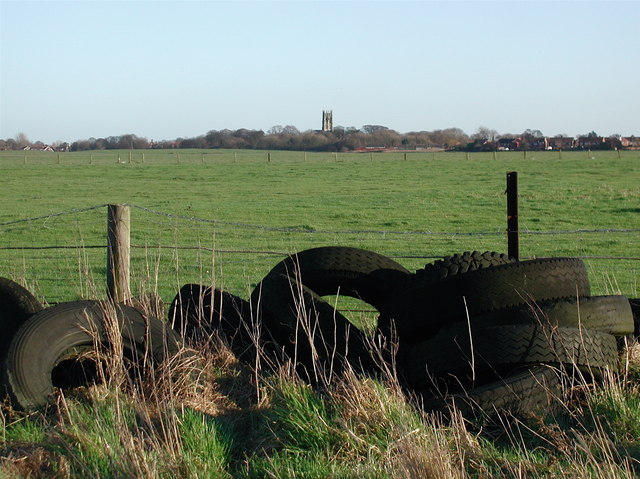
- The former Hedon Aerodrome site, January 2007

Site information
- Owner: Air Ministry; Hull City Council (current)
- Operator: Royal Flying Corps; Royal Air Force
- Condition: Grassland

Location
- Shown within the East Riding of Yorkshire
- Coordinates: 53°44′39.3″N 0°13′40.9″W
- Grid reference: TA170290

Site history
- Built: 1912
- In use: 1959

Airfield information
- Elevation: 5 metres (16 ft) AMSL
Runways
Direction	Length and surface
	Grass

Hedon Aerodrome (also known as Royal Air Force Hedon and Royal Air Force Hull), was an airfield located 6 miles (9.7 km) east of Kingston upon Hull in the East Riding of Yorkshire, England. The airfield was in operation intermittently between 1912 and the late 1950s both in a civilian and a military capacity. It was rejected as a Second World War airfield due to its proximity to the Salt End chemical works and oil tanks.

== History ==
The first non-agricultural use of the fields was in 1888 when Hedon Park Racecourse was laid out over them. At one time, the racecourse had the longest racing straight section in Britain. The racecourse adjoined the Hull-Withernsea railway line (which ran along the northern border of the course) and the North Eastern Railway opened up a station to serve the racecourse, although the station was not in the timetables and trains only stopped for traffic on race days. Traffic ceased when the racecourse closed in 1909, but saw a brief resurgence for a few months in 1948 and 1949, when the site known as Hedon Stadium was used as a speedway track.

The first person to fly to and from the grassed area that was to become Hedon Aerodrome was a young German pilot called Gustav Hamel in 1912. Hamel also became the first flying postman in England when he carried letters and cards between Hendon and Windsor.

When the First World War was declared, the airfield became a gathering point for Holderness villagers in the event of an invasion and the East Yorkshire Regiment used the airfield as a parking place for their heavy artillery. Flying activity at Hedon during this time was confined solely to 33 and 76 Squadrons of the Royal Flying Corps who used it as a night landing airfield which they deemed to be a 2nd-class landing ground. After the end of the First World War, the airfield was closed to military flying.

Prince George performed the opening ceremony for the Hull Municipal Airport in October 1929 which also saw a flying display by No. 29 Squadron RAF. Flying resumed when the Hull Flying Club (now known as Hull Aero Club) commenced pleasure flights from what was then a grassed area covering 200 acres (81 ha). At this time, Hull Council had acquired the site to promote commercial interests too and the grassed area had no definable runway with the dimensions being 4,830 feet (1,470 m) from west to east and 2,040 feet (620 m) from north to south. Flying at the site was restricted because of radio masts, telephone wires and its proximity to Salt End chemical works which was only 1-mile (1.6 km) to the south-west.

The piece of history that Hedon is most famous for was in August 1930, when Amy Johnson arrived at the aerodrome to a rapturous applause and gifts from the people of her home town. She had just returned to the United Kingdom after performing her solo flight from England to Australia. Sir Alan Cobham's Flying Circus visited the site in the 1930s and for a while from 1934 to 1935, the Dutch carrier, KLM, operated flights from Amsterdam to Liverpool with a stopover at Hedon. In the early 1930s, the Civilian Aircraft Company established a manufacturing site on the southern edge of the aerodrome. The venture was short-lived as the company was bankrupted in 1933 after producing only one type of aircraft.

After 1935, grazing rights for cattle were applied for by three local farmers and the building of a cattle shelter on the site. Hedon was surveyed after the outbreak of the Second World War, but was declared unfit for the needs of military flying. The proximity to the chemical works and the oil tanks at Salt End, were deemed to be too close for safe flying. Old cars were piled up upon the airfield to prevent enemy aircraft from using it. However, the airfield was utilised as No. 63 site of the Hull Barrage, flying balloons deployed from RAF Sutton on Hull. Meteorological readings were also taken from here to determine the levels of static electricity.

After the Second World War it was used as a speedway track by the 'Hull's Angels', before the Hull Corporation Airfield Company was wound up by the council, who then abandoned the aerodrome in July 1951. A large portion of the site is now farmland with the rest taken over by industry, woodland and Skirlaugh ARLFC's rugby ground.

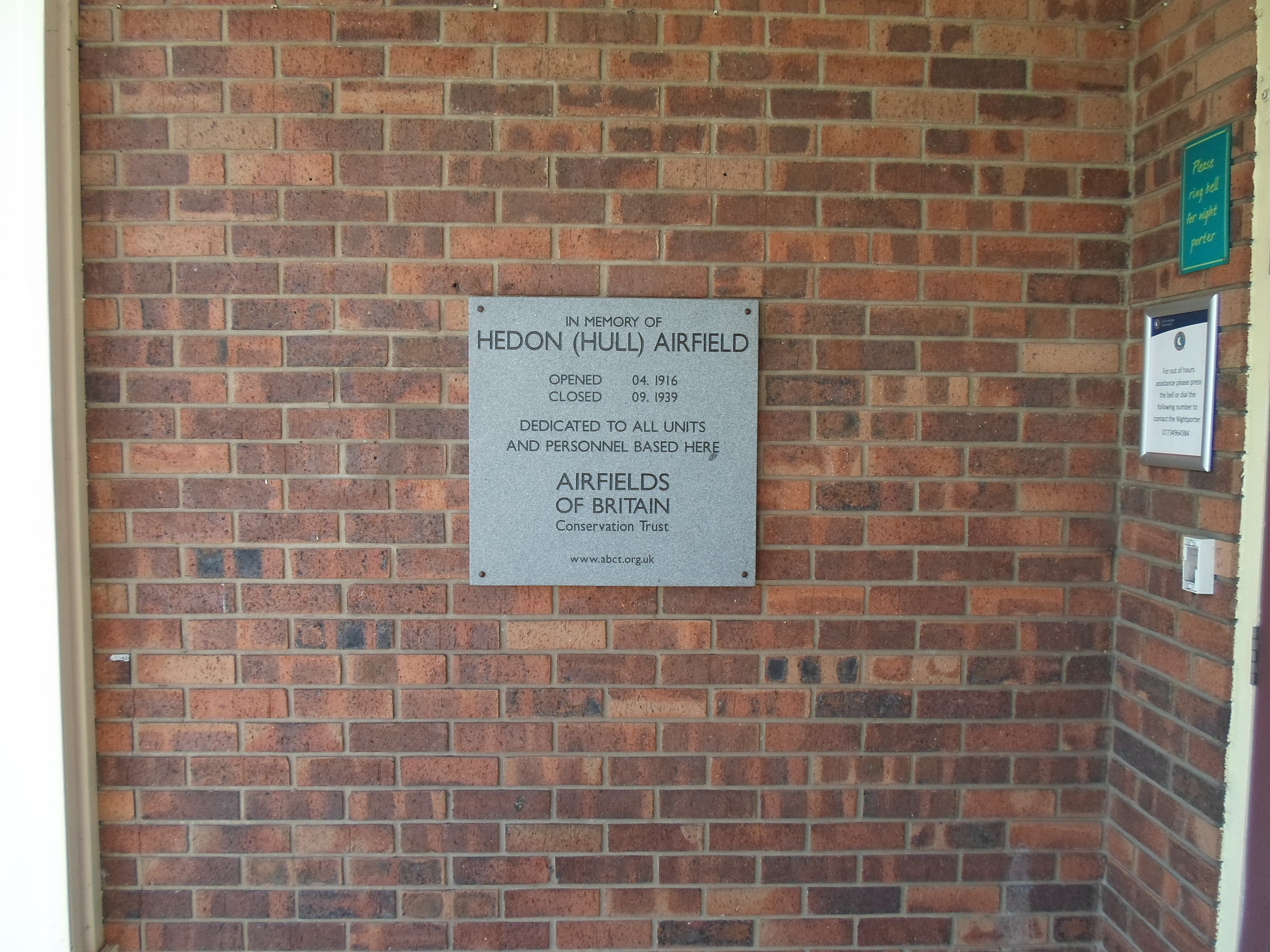
The plaque, unveiled by the Airfields of Britain Conservation Trust (ABCT), July 2017.

In the late-1950s a group of businessmen, spearheaded by Kingston upon Hull resident Neville Medforth, attempted to restart flying from the site. Despite valiant efforts to clear and level the former airfield and with some brief flying taking place, the attempts of the group, which was known as the East Yorkshire Aero Company, ultimately failed following a planning objection by The Distillers Company of Salt End in September 1959. Despite the matter going to a public inquiry in February 1960, the decision remained in favour of the industrial works. Their efforts were not totally in vain however, as the flying group would eventually go on to establish an airfield in Paull during the late-1960s, which would become the base of the newly reformed Hull Aero Club until the early-1980s. In June 2016, a book about these efforts was published by Neville Medforth's grandson, entitled The Hedon Aerodrome Saga: Death of an Airport.

In July 2017, a plaque commemorating the airfield was installed by the Airfields of Britain Conservation Trust at the neighbouring Kingstown Hotel in Hedon.

== Yorkshire Energy Park ==
In 2013, a consortium of companies announced their intention to build on the remaining land and create the Yorkshire Energy Park. This would involve a business park, an educational campus, a data centre, local sport provision and a power plant. Originally the power was intended to be generated from biomass but this has been amended to run off natural gas. Part of the proposal is to move the Skirlaugh ARLFC ground to the eastern end of the site. It was hoped that the park could be started in 2018, however, it was not until June 2020 that the final approval was given.
