= Thorngumbald =

Village and civil parish in the East Riding of Yorkshire, England

Coordinates: 53.7208°N 0.1715°W

- Location within the East Riding of Yorkshire
- Population: 3,392 (2011 census)
- OS grid reference: TA207264
  - London: 150 mi (240 km) S
- Civil parish: Thorngumbald
- Unitary authority: East Riding of Yorkshire
- Ceremonial county: East Riding of Yorkshire
- Region: Yorkshire and the Humber
- Country: England
- Sovereign state: United Kingdom
- Post town: HULL
- Postcode district: HU12
- Dialling code: 01964
- Police: Humberside
- Fire: Humberside
- Ambulance: Yorkshire
- UK Parliament: Beverley and Holderness

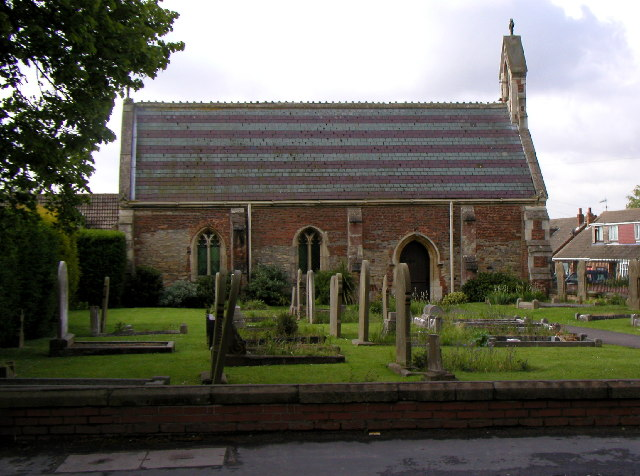
Church of St Mary

Thorngumbald is a village and civil parish in the East Riding of Yorkshire, England, in an area known as Holderness, 8 miles (13 km) east of Hull on the A1033. The civil parish is formed by the village and the hamlets of Camerton and Ryehill. At the 2011 census, it had a population of 3,392, an increase on the 2001 UK census figure of 3,106.

== History ==
Thorngumbald was once a Viking settlement – the official emblem of Thorngumbald is a Viking helmet with wings. The name was first recorded in the Domesday Book as "Torn", an Old English word meaning 'thorn bush'. The name was still in use in 1228, but by 1260 it had become "Thorne". In the lay subsidy rolls of Edward 1, 1297, it is given as Thorengumbald. A Baron Gumbaud had settled in the area, adding his name to the original and giving the village its present name. The Gumbaud name was associated with the local Lord of the manor in the 13th century. By the 17th century the village had had different spellings, including Thorgumbaud, Thorngumbold, Thorneygumbald and Gumberthorn. The current name has been in use since then.

== Community ==
The parish church of St Mary is a Grade II listed building. The village also had a Methodist church, built 1904. However the stones of the church were relaid in 1984.

Thorngumbald Primary School hosts meetings for local organisations, such as the Brownies and St John Ambulance which provide weekly activities for children and teenagers.

The village is home to former Hull City player Chris Chilton.

== Education ==
Thorngumbald Primary School is a local Primary School catering for children aged between 4 and 11. The school is a September 2007 amalgamation of Thorngumbald Infant and Junior Schools, now on a newly built site on Plumtree Road, originally the site used by Thorngumbald Infant School.

South Holderness Technology College in the village of Preston is the nearest secondary school. It caters for students from ages 11 to 16, with a Sixth Form College for those from 16 to 18. Thorngumbald is within the school's catchment area and buses provided by the school transport students of all age groups to and from the village in the morning and afternoon.

== Transport ==
The village was once served by a railway linking Withernsea and Hull at Ryehill and Burstwick station. It closed in 1964 following the Beeching cuts.

== Sport ==
The village has its own football club which competes in the Hull & District Youth Football League And Cup, Thorngumbald Barrons who play their home matches on the playing fields on Plumtree Road.

== See also ==
- Listed buildings in Thorngumbald
