= Hedon railway station =

Disused railway station in the East Riding of Yorkshire, England

Hedon
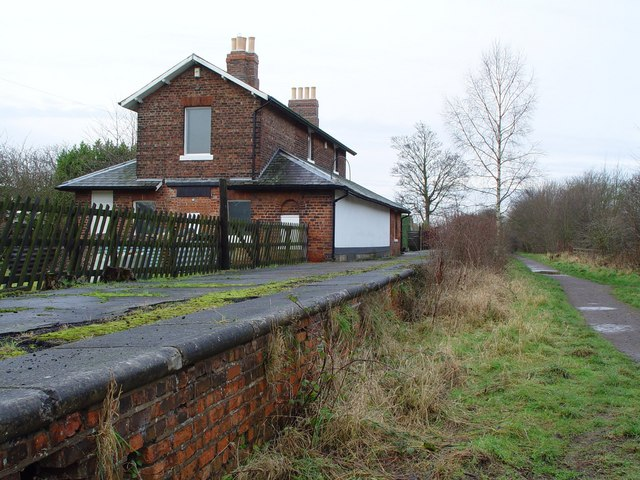
- Hedon railway station in 2008

General information
- Location: Hedon, East Riding of Yorkshire; England
- Coordinates: 53.7446°N 0.1983°W
- Grid reference: TA189290
- Platforms: 1

Other information
- Status: Disused

History
- Original company: Hull and Holderness Railway
- Pre-grouping: North Eastern Railway
- Post-grouping: London and North Eastern Railway

Key dates
- 1854: Opened
- 1964: Closed for passengers
- 3 June 1968: closed for freight
Location

Hedon railway station is a disused railway station on the North Eastern Railway's Hull and Holderness Railway on the northern edge of Hedon in the East Riding of Yorkshire, England. It was opened by the Hull and Holderness Railway on 27 June 1854. The station was closed to passengers on 19 October 1964 and to freight on 3 June 1968.

Initially, trains ran west to Hull's Victoria Dock station, but after the North Eastern Railway took over the line from June 1864, services terminated at Hull Paragon, which put the distance between the two stations at 8 miles (13 km).

The goods shed was a west facing structure that was to the north of the station. It was built outside of the Borough of Hedon due to a clause in the town's charter of 1170 which allowed the inhabitants to charge for goods unloaded in the boundaries of the town. Although this was written for shipping entering the town via Hedon Haven, the Hull and Holderness railway were unwilling to pay the dues, so they located the goods shed in the parish of Preston.

Preceding station	Disused railways	Following station
Hedon Racecourse	North Eastern Railway; Hull and Holderness Railway	Burstwick
