= Keyingham railway station =

Disused railway station in the East Riding of Yorkshire, England

Keyingham
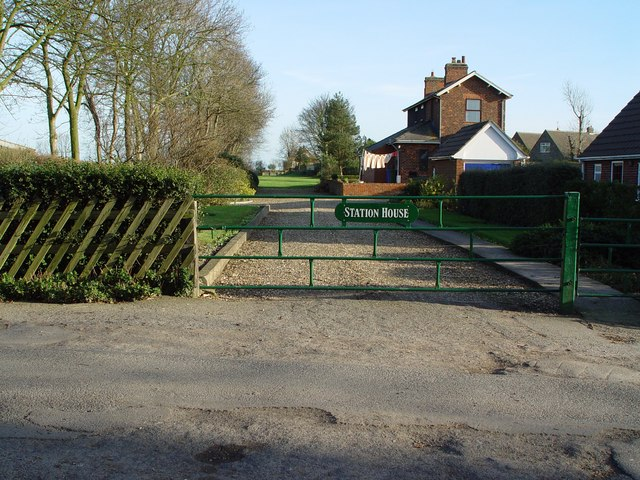
- Station House, Keyingham in 2008

General information
- Location: Keyingham, East Riding of Yorkshire; England
- Coordinates: 53.7145°N 0.1070°W
- Grid reference: TA249259
- Platforms: 2

Other information
- Status: Disused

History
- Original company: Hull and Holderness Railway
- Pre-grouping: North Eastern Railway
- Post-grouping: London and North Eastern Railway

Key dates
- 1854: Opened
- 1964: Closed
Location

Keyingham railway station is a disused railway station on the North Eastern Railway's Hull and Holderness Railway to the north of Keyingham, East Riding of Yorkshire, England. It was opened by the Hull and Holderness Railway on 27 June 1854. The station was closed to passengers on 19 October 1964.

Preceding station	Disused railways	Following station
Burstwick	North Eastern Railway; Hull and Holderness Railway	Ottringham
