= Listed buildings in Ottringham =

Ottringham is a civil parish in the county of the East Riding of Yorkshire, England. It contains five listed buildings that are recorded in the National Heritage List for England. Of these, one is listed at Grade I, the highest of the three grades, and the others are at Grade II, the lowest grade. The parish contains the village of Ottringham and the surrounding countryside. The listed buildings consist of a church, a house with an attached workshop, a milestone and two farmhouses.

== Key ==
Grade	Criteria
I	Buildings of exceptional interest, sometimes considered to be internationally important
II	Buildings of national importance and special interest

== Buildings ==
Name and location	Photograph	Date	Notes	Grade
St Wilfrid's Church; 53.70095°N 0.08121°W		12th century	The church has been altered and extended through the centuries. It is built in a variety of materials, including cobbles, limestone, and red brick, it is partly rendered, and has roofs of Welsh slate, pantile and lead. The church consists of a nave with a clerestory, north and south aisles, a south porch, a south transeptal chapel, a chancel and a west steeple. The steeple has a tower with five stages, a moulded plinth, diagonal buttresses, moulded string courses, a three-light pointed west window, slit lights, a clock face, two-light pointed bell openings and a corbelled out coped parapet, on which is a recessed octagonal broach spire with a finial and a weathervane.	I
Churchside; 53.70126°N 0.08064°W	—	Early to mid-18th century	A house with an attached workshop to the left, in red brick, colourwashed at the front, with a pantile roof, and tumbled-in brick to the raised left gable. There are two low storeys, the house has two bays, and there is a later rear outshut. The doorway is under a segmental arch, and the windows are horizontal sliding sashes, those on the ground floor under segmental arches. The workshop has double doors under a soldier arch, and to its left is a workshop window with vertical glazing bars.	II
Nearmarsh Farmhouse; 53.68459°N 0.10968°W		Mid to late 18th century	The farmhouse is in brick, with stepped eaves, and a pantile roof with tumbled-in brick to the raised gable. There are two storeys and attics, and an L-shaped plan, with a front range of three bays, and an outshut in the angle. On the front is a doorway with a fanlight in an eared architrave, and on the left return is doorway with a fanlight in an architrave under a segmental arch. The windows are sashes, some in architraves.	II
Milestone; 53.69980°N 0.07248°W		Early 19th century	The milestone is on the north side of Patrington Road (A1033 road). It is in limestone, and consists of a round-headed stone about 30 centimetres (12 in) square, and about 70 centimetres (28 in) in height. Attached is a cast iron plate with the distances to Patrington and Hull.	II
Ottringham Grange Farmhouse; 53.68287°N 0.08679°W		Early 19th century	The farmhouse is in brick, with a bracketed gutter, and a double-span pantile roof with tumbled-in brick to the raised gables. There are two storeys, a double depth plan, and a front of three bays. In the centre is a projecting Doric porch with columns, an entablature and a flat hood, and a doorway with pilasters and a radial fanlight. The windows are sashes in recessed architraves, with sandstone sills and rubbed brick flat arches.	II
