= Ottringham railway station =

Disused railway station in the East Riding of Yorkshire, England

Ottringham
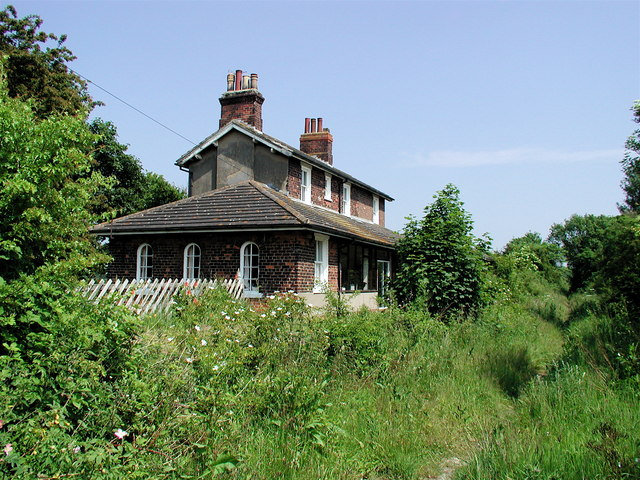
- Station House, Ottringham

General information
- Location: Ottringham, East Riding of Yorkshire; England
- Coordinates: 53.7112°N 0.0744°W
- Grid reference: TA271256
- Platforms: 2

Other information
- Status: Disused

History
- Original company: Hull and Holderness Railway
- Pre-grouping: North Eastern Railway
- Post-grouping: London and North Eastern Railway

Key dates
- 1854: Opened
- 1964: Closed for passengers
- 1965: closed for freight
Location

Ottringham railway station is a disused railway station on the North Eastern Railway's Hull and Holderness Railway to the north of Ottringham, East Riding of Yorkshire, England.

== History ==
It was opened by the Hull and Holderness Railway on 27 June 1854. The station was closed to passengers on 19 October 1964 and to goods on 3 May 1965.

Preceding station	Disused railways	Following station
Keyingham	North Eastern Railway; Hull and Holderness Railway	Winestead
