= Camerton =

Camerton may refer to:

- Camerton, Cumbria, a village in England
- Camerton, East Riding of Yorkshire, a village in England
- Camerton, Somerset, a village in England
- Camerton (band), a pop band from Mongolia
