= East Hull =

East Hull may refer to:

- East Hull A.R.L.F.C., rugby league team
- East Hull F.C., association football team
- Kingston upon Hull East (UK Parliament constituency)
