= Ryehill =

Ryehill may refer to:

- Ryehill, East Riding of Yorkshire, England
- Ryehill, Aberdeenshire, Scotland

== See also ==
- Ryhill
