= Southcoates railway station =

Disused railway station in the East Riding of Yorkshire, England

Southcoates
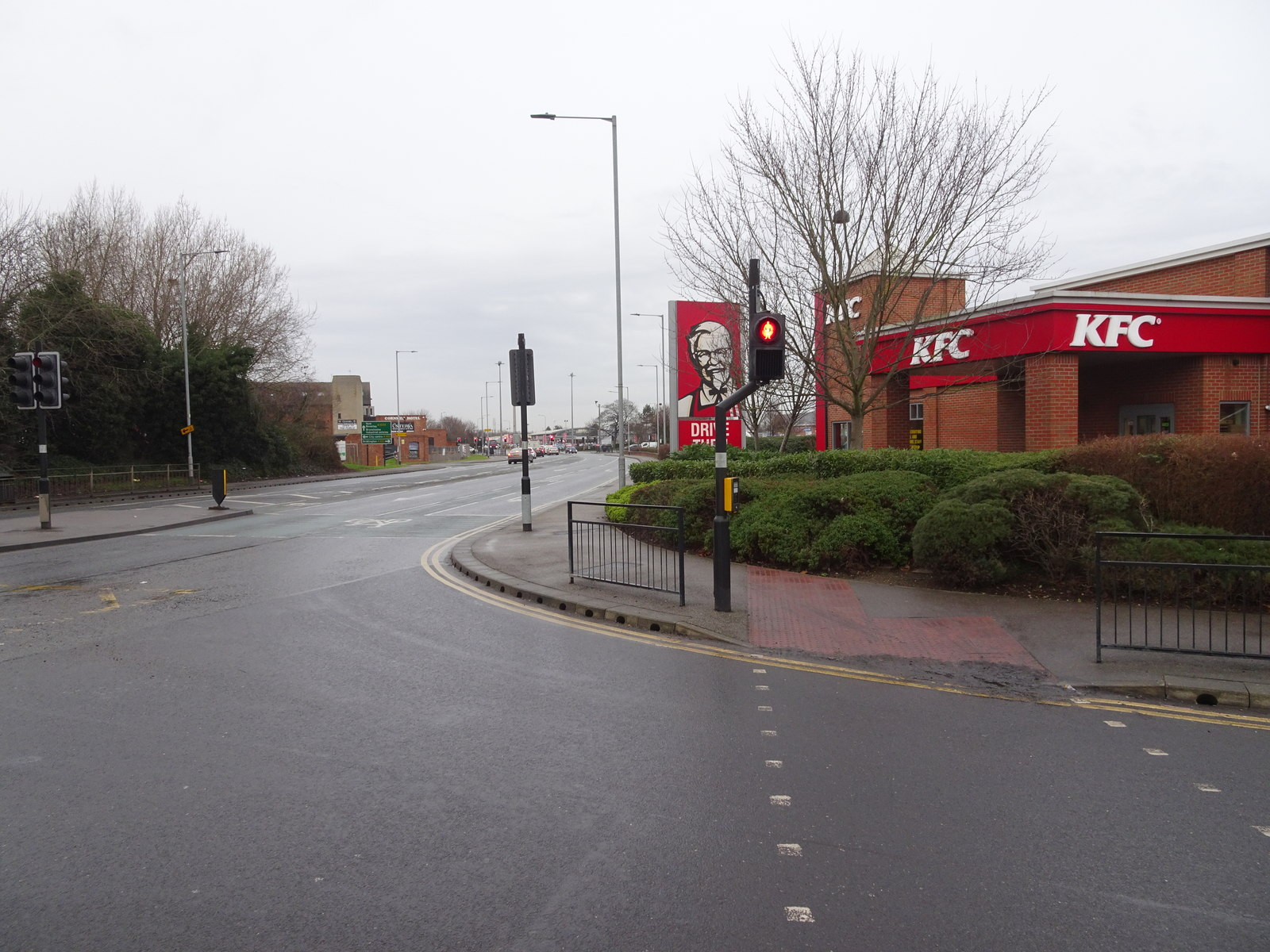
- The site of the station in 2018

General information
- Location: Hull, East Riding of Yorkshire; England
- Coordinates: 53.751000°N 0.315000°W
- Grid reference: TA112296
- Platforms: 2

Other information
- Status: Disused

History
- Original company: York and North Midland Railway
- Pre-grouping: North Eastern Railway
- Post-grouping: London and North Eastern Railway

Key dates
- 1848: Opened
- 1854: Closed
- 1864: Re-opened
- 1964: Closed
Location

Southcoates railway station was a railway station on the North Eastern Railway's Victoria Dock Branch Line in Hull, East Riding of Yorkshire, England. It was opened by the York and North Midland Railway on 8 May 1848. The station was closed in November 1854 and reopened on 1 June 1864 before final closure on 19 October 1964. It served the suburb of Southcoates.

Since closure the station has been completely demolished.

Preceding station	Disused railways	Following station
Wilmington; Line and station closed	North Eastern Railway; Hull and Holderness Railway	Marfleet; Line and station closed
Wilmington; Line and station closed	North Eastern Railway; Victoria Dock Branch Line	Hull Victoria Dock; Line and station closed
