= Listed buildings in Thorngumbald =

Thorngumbald is a civil parish in the county of the East Riding of Yorkshire, England. It contains six listed buildings that are recorded in the National Heritage List for England. All the listed buildings are designated at Grade II, the lowest of the three grades, which is applied to "buildings of national importance and special interest". The parish contains the village of Thorngumbald, the hamlets of Camerton and Ryehill, and the surrounding countryside. The listed buildings consist of a church, farmhouses and farm buildings, and two milestones.

== Buildings ==
Name and location	Photograph	Date	Notes
St Mary's Church; 53.72063°N 0.17142°W		12th century	The church has been much altered through the centuries, including the replacement of the tower with a bellcote in 1858. Most of the church is built in limestone and brick, with a banded slate roof, and the vestry is in brown brick with a pantile roof. The church consists of a nave and a chancel in one unit, and a south vestry. On the west gable end is a corbelled bellcote with a single arch and a coped gable, shaped kneelers and a finial.
Thorney Crofts Farmhouse and stable 53.69007°N 0.16396°W		Mid-18th century	The farmhouse and stable are in red brick on a plinth, with pantile roofs and tumbled-in brick to the raised gables. The house has two storeys and two bays, and wings with a single storey and attics and two bays. The windows are casements with flat stucco arches. The doorway, at the rear has pilasters, and there is a round-headed stair window.
Ryehill Manor House; 53.71779°N 0.14910°W	—	c. 1760	The farmhouse is in whitewashed brick, with a wooden eaves board, a modillion gutter and a hipped Welsh slate roof. There is a T-shaped plan, consisting of a main range, a rear wing with an outshut, and additions in the angle. On the front is a projecting porch with slender columns, a moulded cornice and a flat hood, and a doorway in an architrave with a fanlight. The windows are sashes in architraves under stucco flat arches.
Farm ranges, Camerton Hall Farm; 53.71678°N 0.15691°W	—	Late 18th century	The ranges of farm buildings are in brown brick with pantile roofs, they have two storeys and form an L-shaped plan on the north and west sides of a foldyard. The north range contains a cart shed and stable, and the west range has stables and a cart shed outshut. The north range has twelve upper floor openings, and the west range has eight.
Milestone near High Bridge; 53.71300°N 0.13770°W		Late 18th to early 19th century (probable)	The milestone is in a triangular area at a junction on the north side of the A1033 road. It is in whitewashed limestone, with a flat head, and is about 0.6 metres (2 ft 0 in) in height. Attached is a round-headed cast iron plate inscribed with the distances to Patrington and to Hull.
Milestone near Southlands; 53.71875°N 0.15660°W		Late 18th to early 19th century (probable)	The milestone on the north side of the A1033 road. It is in whitewashed limestone, with a flat head, and is about 0.6 metres (2 ft 0 in) in height. Attached is a round-headed cast iron plate inscribed with the distances to Patrington and to Hull.
