= Listed buildings in Burstwick =

Burstwick is a civil parish in the county of the East Riding of Yorkshire, England. It contains five listed buildings that are recorded in the National Heritage List for England. Of these, one is listed at Grade I, the highest of the three grades, and the others are at Grade II, the lowest grade. The parish contains the village of Burstwick and the surrounding countryside, and the listed buildings consist of a church and houses.

== Key ==
Grade	Criteria
I	Buildings of exceptional interest, sometimes considered to be internationally important
II	Buildings of national importance and special interest

== Buildings ==
Name and location	Photograph	Date	Notes	Grade
All Saints' Church; 53.73426°N 0.14048°W		13th century	The church has been altered and extended through the centuries, including three restorations during the 19th century. It is built in cobbles and stone, with limestone dressings, roofs of slate and lead, and the porch is in brick with a pantile roof. The church consists of a nave with a south porch, a transeptal south chapel, a north aisle, a chancel with a north chapel, and a west tower. The tower has three stages, a moulded plinth, diagonal buttresses, string courses, and slit windows. There is a three-light west window, with a pointed head and a hood mould, above which is an ogee-headed niche with a statue, two-light pointed bell openings, and a coped embattled parapet.	I
The Cottage; 53.73000°N 0.13828°W		Mid-18th century	The house is in red-brown brick, with stepped eaves, a wooden gutter on wrought iron brackets, and a pantile roof with tumbled-in brickwork to the raised gables. There is one storey with attics, and three bays. On the front is a doorway and horizontally sliding sash windows, all under segmental arches.	II
Ridgemont; 53.74048°N 0.11417°W		1824–25	The house is in red-brown brick on the front and yellow brick elsewhere, on a plinth with a reset datestone, with a plain eaves board, ornate cast iron gutter brackets, and a hipped slate roof. There are two storeys, and a south front of five bays. In the centre is a porch with Tuscan columns, an entablature and a hood, and a doorway with pilasters and a fanlight in a moulded surround. The windows are sashes with painted lintels, those on the ground floor with hoods. The east front has four bays and a porch with a cambered head.	II
Nuthill Farmhouse; 53.75192°N 0.15871°W		1825	The farmhouse is in yellow brick on a stuccoed plinth, with a sill band, a plain eaves board, a gutter on ornate cast iron brackets, and a hipped Welsh slate roof. There are two storeys, and an L-shaped plan, with a front range of five bays, and a rear wing on the left. In the centre is a Doric porch with fluted columns, and an entablature with a plain frieze, a moulded cornice and a hood. The doorway has fluted pilasters, and a radial fanlight in a panelled reveal. The windows are sashes with channelled wedge lintels and keystones.	II
Burstwick House; 53.73128°N 0.14403°W	—	Early 19th century	The house is in yellow brick on the front and red brick elsewhere, with a plain eaves board, and a roof in Welsh slate at the front and pantile elsewhere, with stone coping. There are two storeys and attics, and an L-shaped plan, with a front of three bays, a rear wing on the left, outshuts in the angle, and another rear extension. In the centre is an entrance with fluted pilasters, an entablature with a plain frieze and a moulded cornice and hood, and a doorway with a panelled reveal, a radial fanlight and a moulded cornice. The windows are sashes with channelled and cambered wedge lintels and keystones. On the returns are bow windows.	II
