= Ottringham =

Village and civil parish in the East Riding of Yorkshire, England

Coordinates: 53.700447°N 0.079639°W

- Location within the East Riding of Yorkshire
- Population: 597 (2011 census)
- OS grid reference: TA268243
  - London: 155 mi (249 km) S
- Civil parish: Ottringham
- Unitary authority: East Riding of Yorkshire
- Ceremonial county: East Riding of Yorkshire
- Region: Yorkshire and the Humber
- Country: England
- Sovereign state: United Kingdom
- Post town: HULL
- Postcode district: HU12
- Dialling code: 01964
- Police: Humberside
- Fire: Humberside
- Ambulance: Yorkshire
- UK Parliament: Beverley and Holderness

Ottringham is a village and civil parish in the East Riding of Yorkshire, England, in an area known as Holderness. It is situated approximately 12 miles (19 km) to the east of Hull city centre and 5 miles (8 km) south-west of Withernsea. It lies on the A1033 road from Hull to Withernsea.

According to the 2011 UK census, Ottringham parish had a population of 597, a reduction on the 2001 UK census figure of 637.

In 1823 parish inhabitants numbered 637. Occupations included twelve farmers, some of whom were land owners, four shoemakers, three grocers, two tailors, two wheelwrights, a blacksmith, a corn miller, a horse dealer, and the landlord of the White Horse public house. Two carriers operated between the village and Hull, South Frodingham, Holmpton, and Skeckling, on Tuesdays and Fridays. Letters were received and sent on Mondays, Wednesdays and Saturdays by Wing's caravan [accommodation coach]. A Methodist chapel existed, built in 1815.

The name Ottringham possibly derives from the Old English Oteringashām or Oteringhām, meaning 'village of Oter's people' or 'village at the otter place'.

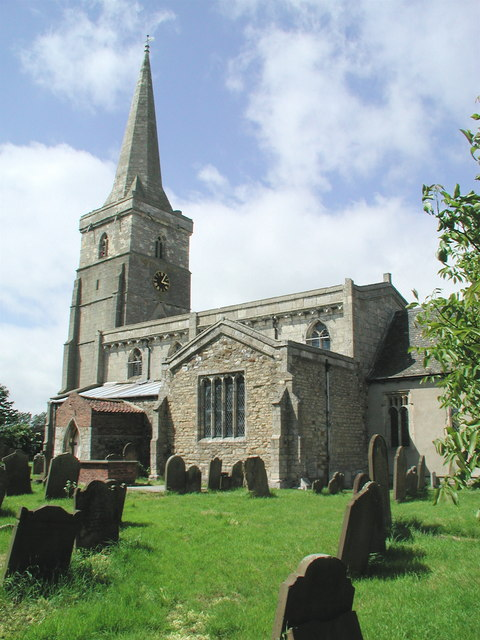
St Wilfrid's Church, Ottringham

The Anglican St Wilfrid's Church, Ottringham is a Grade I listed building. In November 2024 the church was placed on the Heritage at Risk Register by Historic England who gave a grant to start repairs.

Ottringham was served from 1854 to 1964 by Ottringham railway station on the Hull and Holderness Railway.

During the Second World War, in 1943, the BBC built a transmitting station at Ottringham, called BBC Ottringham or OSE5. Its purpose was to counter the increase in German jamming signals, and to broadcast propaganda into Germany. Following the end of the war, and with lack of funds, the station was deconstructed in 1953 and its transmitters moved to Droitwich.

In 1958 a Ham class minesweeper HMS Ottringham was named after the village.

Ottringham contains two public houses and a service garage. It is close to a main bus route.

== Freedom of the Parish ==
The following people and military units have received the Freedom of the Parish of Ottringham.

=== Individuals ===
- Ernest "Ernie" Oldfield: 15 June 2023.

== See also ==
- Listed buildings in Ottringham
