= Camerton, East Riding of Yorkshire =

Hamlet in the East Riding of Yorkshire, England

Coordinates: 53.720286°N 0.149287°W

Camerton
- Location within the East Riding of Yorkshire
- OS grid reference: TA222264
  - London: 150 mi (240 km) S
- Civil parish: Thorngumbald
- Unitary authority: East Riding of Yorkshire
- Ceremonial county: East Riding of Yorkshire
- Region: Yorkshire and the Humber
- Country: England
- Sovereign state: United Kingdom
- Post town: HULL
- Postcode district: HU12
- Dialling code: 01964
- Police: Humberside
- Fire: Humberside
- Ambulance: Yorkshire
- UK Parliament: Beverley and Holderness

Camerton is a hamlet in the East Riding of Yorkshire, England, in an area known as Holderness. It is situated approximately 7 miles (11 km) east of Hull city centre and lies just north of the A1033 road.

It forms part of the civil parish of Thorngumbald.

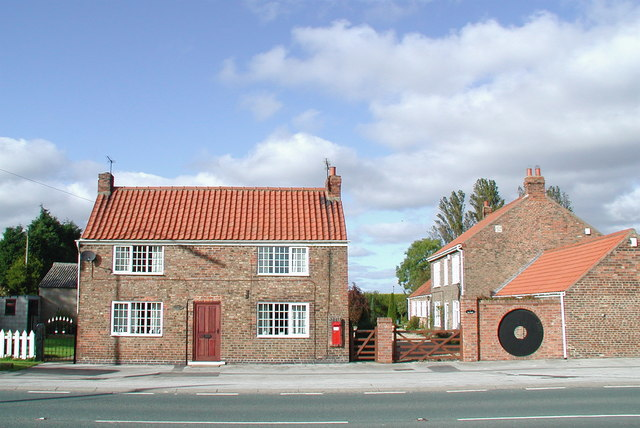
Main Road, Camerton

== See also ==
- Listed buildings in Thorngumbald
