= All Saints' Church, Burstwick =

Church in Burstwick, East Riding of Yorkshire, England

Coordinates: 53°44′03″N 0°08′25″W

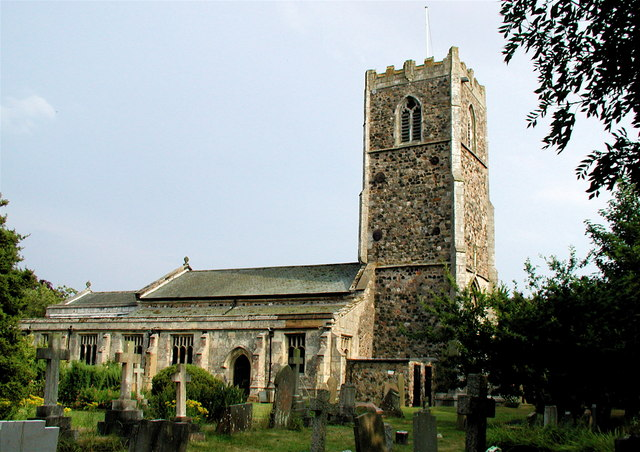
The church, in 2006

All Saints' Church is a former Anglican church in Burstwick, a village in the East Riding of Yorkshire, in England.

The church was built in the 13th century, from which period the nave and some windows survive. A south chapel was added in the 14th century, followed by the chancel, north aisle, north chapel and tower in the 15th century. The chancel was restored in 1830, then a restoration of 1853 included rebuilding the south porch, and one of 1893 included a new floor and roof. The building was grade I listed in 1966. By the 2020s, the church required repairs costing an estimated £250,000, and although some work was completed, the building closed for worship on 1 February 2023.

The church is built of cobbles and stone, with limestone dressings, roofs of slate and lead, and the porch is in brick with a pantile roof. The church consists of a nave with a south porch, a transeptal south chapel, a north aisle, a chancel with a north chapel, and a west tower. The tower has three stages, a moulded plinth, diagonal buttresses, string courses, and slit windows. There is a three-light west window, with a pointed head and a hood mould, above which is an ogee-headed niche with a statue, two-light pointed bell openings, and a coped embattled parapet. Inside, there are several sedilia and piscina, as well as an aumbry. There are 17th-century graveslabs and 18th- and 19th-century wall memorials, and a coat of arms of Charles I of England, created by John Catlyn in 1676. The chancel windows contain some fragments of 15th-century stained glass.

== See also ==
- Grade I listed buildings in the East Riding of Yorkshire
- Listed buildings in Burstwick
