= Hedon Stadium =

Former stadium in the East Riding of Yorkshire, England

- Interactive map of Hedon Stadium
- Location: Staithes Road, Hedon, East Riding of Yorkshire, England
- Coordinates: 53°44′46″N 0°13′29″W

Tenant
- Hull Angels (1948-1949)

Hedon Stadium was a motorcycle speedway venue between Hedon and Hull, England. The location of the stadium was south of the Hedon Racecourse railway station, which is on the east side of the Staithes Road, about 5 miles from the centre of Hull and 1 mile west of Hedon.

== History ==
The site started life as Hedon Park Racecourse in 1888 before closing in 1909 and becoming Hedon Aerodrome and later a wartime depot. After the Second World War the Hull Corporation Airfield Company was wound up by the council, who then abandoned the aerodrome in 1951.

Meanwhile, in 1948, part of the site became a venue for speedway at the cost of £1,400 to the city but was rented out to the Hull Angels speedway team for £600 per year. The council also gave the go-ahead for greyhound racing, which at the time was the most lucrative sport in Britain, eclipsing association football revenue around the country. The Hedon Racecourse railway station was renamed Hedon Halt railway station on 14 Auguist 1948, ready for the speedway attendances.

The Hull Angels, promoted by Hull Speedways Ltd, built a 459 yards track before it was shortened the following year to 443 yards. The team competed in the 1948 Speedway National League Division Three and had an official opening on 27 March 1948 in front of 6,000 people. The ceremony was conducted by Mayor and Mayoress of Hedon.

The following season the speedway returned and on 21 May 1949, the stadium held its most significant event to date, a qualifying round of the 1949 Individual Speedway World Championship. Despite the promising start to 1949, matters began to worsen. The greyhound racing never materialised and the speedway attendances were being affected by the remote location of the track. The speedway manager Capt. Fred Archer also announced that the club were losing money.

On 27 August, the Hull Angels raced their last match at home to Liverpool Chads and then after one more away match they withdrew from the league to be replaced by Swindon Robins. The speedway promotion applied, without success, to Hull City FC to see if they could use their old Anlaby Road ground.
