= Listed buildings in Preston, East Riding of Yorkshire =

Preston is a civil parish in the county of the East Riding of Yorkshire, England. It contains nine listed buildings that are recorded in the National Heritage List for England. Of these, one is listed at Grade I, the highest of the three grades, and the others are at Grade II, the lowest grade. The parish contains the village of Preston and the surrounding countryside. Apart from a church and a milestone, all the listed buildings are farmhouses and associated structures.

== Key ==
| Grade | Criteria |
|---|---|
| I | Buildings of exceptional interest, sometimes considered to be internationally important |
| II | Buildings of national importance and special interest |

== Buildings ==
| Name and location | Photograph | Date | Notes | Grade |
|---|---|---|---|---|
| All Saints' Church; 53.75832°N 0.20095°W | | 13th century | The church has been altered and extended through the centuries, including rebuilding of the chancel in 1870, and a restoration in 1878–82. It is built in limestone and cobble, partly rendered, and has a slate roof on the chancel and lead roofs elsewhere. The church consists of a nave with a clerestory, north and south aisles, a chancel with a north organ chamber and vestry, and a west tower. The tower has four stages, a moulded plinth, angle buttresses with crocketed ogee gablets, moulded string courses, and a pointed west doorway with a crocketed ogee hood mould, and blank shields in relief above. The second stage has ogee niches and a west window with Perpendicular tracery, over which is a hood mould and a niche containing a statue. The third stage contains ogee-headed slit windows and clock faces, and above are twin three-light bell openings with hood moulds, gargoyles, a coped parapet with round-headed openings, and eight crocketed pinnacles. The nave and the aisle have embattled parapets. | I |
| Field House Farm House; 53.75715°N 0.21960°W | | Early to mid-18th century | The farmhouse is in rendered brick, with a plain eaves board, a bracketed gutter, and a pantile roof with raised stone coped gables. There are two storeys and an attic, four bays, and a continuous rear outshut. On the front is a projecting enclosed porch on a plinth, with a recessed door flanked by narrow sash windows, and a flat flagstone roof. Elsewhere, there are sash windows in architraves under segmental arches, on the ground floor with shutters. | II |
| Preston Field Farmhouse and cottage 53.77313°N 0.21505°W | — | Mid-18th century | The farmhouse and the cottage to the east are in brick with pantile roofs. The house has a stepped and dentiled brick eaves cornice and brick coped gables. There are two storeys and an attic, a double-depth plan, and a front of three bays. The central doorway has an architrave, and a fanlight with margin lights, under a channelled stuccoed flat arch, flanked by canted bay windows with hipped roofs. On the upper floor are sash windows in architraves with stucco flat arches. On the left return are French windows. The adjoining cottage has two storeys and two bays, and a lower two-storey single-bay to the right. It contains a doorway and windows, some horizontally sliding sashes. | II |
| Little Weghill Farmhouse; 53.75183°N 0.17486°W | — | 1777 | The farmhouse is in brick, with wrought iron brackets to the gutters, and a tile roof with tumbled-in brick to the raised gables. There are two storeys and an attic, and three bays. The central doorway has an architrave, and the windows are sashes. On the left return is an inserted bow window. | II |
| Milestone; 53.76840°N 0.21093°W | | Late 18th to early 19th century | The milestone is on the west side of Wyton Road (B1239 road). It is in limestone, and consists of a mounting block with worn inscriptions on the east and west sides. On the south side is an Ordnance Survey datum mark. | II |
| Magdalen House and walls 53.74669°N 0.18104°W | | 1815 | The house is in red-brown brick, partly whitewashed, with stepped eaves, and a double-span pantile roof with tumbled-in brick to the raised gables. There are two storeys and attics, a double-depth plan, an outshut on the right, and a south front of three bays. The doorcase has panelled pilasters, impost blocks and a hood, and an inner panelled architrave. The doorway has a radial fanlight in a panelled reveal and a moulded cornice. The windows are sashes, on the ground floor in reveals with rubbed brick cambered brick arches, and on the upper floor in architraves. On the north front is a doorway with an open modillion pediment. The house is flanked by screen walls, the west wall with a ramped parapet. | II |
| Somerdon House Farmhouse, outhouses and wall 53.76055°N 0.24119°W | — | c. 1820 | The farmhouse is in yellow brick, with some red brick, on a stone plinth, with sill bands, a moulded corniced wooden gutter, coped parapets, and a hipped Welsh slate roof. There are two storeys, and a T-shaped plan, with a front range of three bays, and a rear addition. Steps lead up to the central doorcase with ribbed pilasters, an entablature, a plain frieze, a moulded cornice and a hood. The doorway has a radial fanlight in a round-headed reveal, and a moulded cornice. This is flanked by full-height flat-fronted bow windows with tripartite sash windows, and there is a sash window above the doorway. To the left are screen walls and outhouses. The walls contain a round-headed entrance flanked by horizontally sliding sash windows. | II |
| Dovecotes and stables, wall and gateway northeast of Magdalen House; 53.74687°N 0.18048°W | — | 1815 | The two dovecotes are in red brick with pyramidal pantile roofs, each with two storeys and one bay. They have a doorway on each floor under a segmental arch, and slit vents, and on the outer returns are rows of dove holes with shelves. Between the dovecotes is a screen wall with stone coping, and central main and pedestrian entrances. | II |
| Abbey House Farmhouse; 53.75903°N 0.20367°W | — | 1820s | The farmhouse is mainly in yellow-brown brick, with some red brick, a plain eaves board, a corniced wooden gutter, and a hipped Welsh slate roof. There are two storeys, three bays, and later rear additions. On the centre is a projecting Doric porch with slender columns, an entablature, a plain frieze, a moulded cornice and a flat hood, and a doorway with pilasters and a radial fanlight in a reveal. The windows are sashes with wedge lintels. | II |
