= F.C. Humber United =

Association football club in England

FC Humber United
- Full name: FC Humber United
- Dissolved: June 2022
Home colours	Away colours

FC Humber United was a football club based in Dunswell in the East Riding of Yorkshire, England.

== History ==
The club was originally formed as AFC Rovers and played in the East Riding County League. They were Division Two runners-up in 2008–09, earning promotion to Division One. The club went on to win the Division One title the following season and were promoted to the Premier Division. After winning the Premier Division title in 2013–14, they moved up to Division One of the Humber Premier League. They were Division One champions the following season, securing promotion to the Premier Division.

In 2016 the club was taken over by Jamie Waltham after he bought the Dunswell Park ground, and were renamed East Yorkshire Carnegie named after Andrew Carnegie, whose values of "Development, Success and Humanity" were included on the club badge. The new club joined the Premier Division of the Humber Premier League and finished fifth in their first season, earning promotion to Division One of the Northern Counties East League.

In April 2019 it was announced that the club would be renamed East Hull at the start of the 2019–20 season, changing again to FC Humber United in 2021.

In May 2022 the club announced that subject to FA ratification, they were planning to relocate to Askern, Doncaster and merge with the Askern Miners due to being unable to secure a financially viable home ground in East Yorkshire. The following month they announced the club would fold due to the planned merger with Askern Miners falling through.

== Honours ==
- Humber Premier League
  - Division One champions 2014–15
- East Riding County League
  - Premier Division champions 2013–14
  - Division One champions 2009–10

== See also ==
- F.C. Humber United managers
