= Pensana Salt End =

Future metals plant in Yorkshire, England

Pensana Saltend
- Location within East Riding of Yorkshire
- Location: Salt End, East Riding of Yorkshire, England
- Coordinates: 53.741°N 0.244°W
- Industry: Metals refining
- Products: Rare earth metals
- Employees: 100 (2024 projected)
- Owner: Pensana
- Website: Pensana website

Pensana Saltend is a future processing facility for rare earth metals at Salt End, near Hull in the East Riding of Yorkshire, England. When operating at capability, the plant aims to produce 5% of world demand for neodymium and praseodymium oxide. Work on the site started in 2021, with full opening by 2023. The facility will be the first of its kind in Europe.

== History ==
The facility will process rare earths from Angola in Africa, for downstream use in cars, phones, and wind turbines. In September 2021, Pensana confirmed a 25-year lease on the site at Saltend, with a view to providing between 100 and 125 permanent jobs at the plant by 2024. By the time of its operating capability, the plant is aiming to produce 4,500 tonnes (5,000 tons) of neodymium and praseodymium oxide per year; about 5% of global demand by 2025.

As most rare earth metals are processed in China, the facility would be the first of its kind in Europe. The site is located with the Humber Freeport, which launched in October 2021. The site will have the potential to expand and produce up to 12,500 tonnes (13,800 tons) of rare earth metals per year, most of which will be destined for the wind power markets. The intent is that 100% of power for the facility will come from the Dogger Bank Wind Farm via a direct link. The plant is seen as part of a growing concern regarding the supply of the minerals necessary for electric car batteries and wind turbines, as part of a de-carbonised economy. However, with China de-carbonising their industries, it is thought that rare earth metals will be subject to supply issues.

Pensana was formed in 2006, and Besides their future mining operations in Angola, Pensana are also mining for rare earths in Gabon. Pensana claim that their mining and quarrying processes are 'greener' than other mining companies.

In January 2022, a revised application was lodged with a different location some 0.5-mile (0.8 km) to the north-east and covering an area of 35 acres (14 ha). The application also sought to allow for the storage of hydrochloric acid, sodium hydroxide and oxalic acid. In May 2022, East Riding councillors approved the application which will cover over 216,000 square feet (20,100 m^{2}).
