= HMS Ottringham =

Ham-class minesweeper

History

United Kingdom
- Name: HMS Ottringham
- Namesake: Ottringham
- Builder: Ailsa Shipbuilding Company
- Launched: 22 January 1958
- Completed: 17 December 1958
- Fate: transferred to Ghana, October 1959

Ghana
- Name: GNS Afadzato
- Acquired: October 1959
- Commissioned: 31 October 1959
- Fate: broken up, 1977

General characteristics
- Class & type: Ham-class minesweeper
- Displacement: 120 long tons (122 t) standard; 164 long tons (167 t) full load
- Length: 100 ft (30 m) p/p; 106 ft 6 in (32.46 m) o/a, except third sub-group 107 ft 6 in (32.77 m)
- Beam: 21 ft 4 in (6.50 m)
- Draught: 5 ft 6 in (1.68 m)
- Propulsion: 2 shaft Paxman 12YHAXM diesels; 1,100 bhp (820 kW)
- Speed: 14 knots (16 mph; 26 km/h)
- Complement: 2 officers, 13 ratings
- Armament: 1 × Bofors 40 mm L/60 gun or Oerlikon 20 mm cannon
- Notes: Pennant number(s): M2715 / IMS52

HMS Ottringham was one of 93 ships of the Ham class of inshore minesweepers.

Their names were all chosen from villages ending in -ham. The minesweeper was named after Ottringham in the East Riding of Yorkshire.

In 1959, the ship was sold to the Royal Ghana Navy.
