= Ryehill, East Riding of Yorkshire =

Hamlet in the East Riding of Yorkshire, England

Coordinates: 53.714119°N 0.148649°W

Ryehill
- Location within the East Riding of Yorkshire
- OS grid reference: TA222257
- Civil parish: Thorngumbald
- Unitary authority: East Riding of Yorkshire
- Ceremonial county: East Riding of Yorkshire
- Region: Yorkshire and the Humber
- Country: England
- Sovereign state: United Kingdom
- Post town: HULL
- Postcode district: HU12
- Dialling code: 01964
- Police: Humberside
- Fire: Humberside
- Ambulance: Yorkshire
- UK Parliament: Beverley and Holderness

Ryehill is a hamlet in the East Riding of Yorkshire, England, in an area known as Holderness. It is situated approximately 7 miles (11 km) east of Hull city centre and lies just south of the A1033 road, (the main road from Hull to Withernsea).

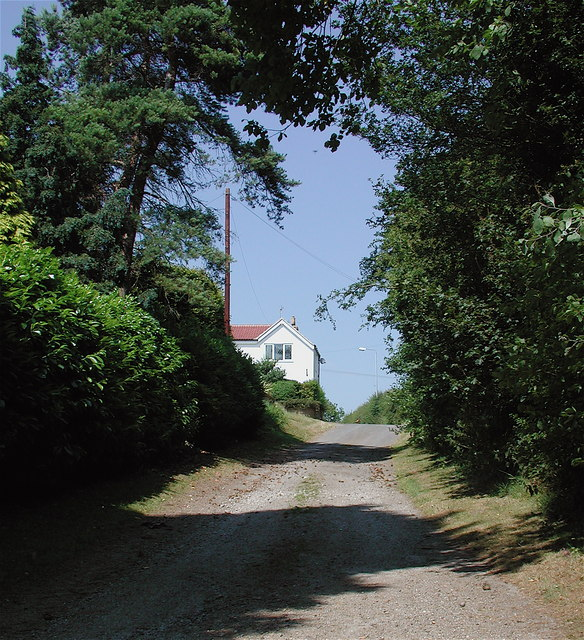
Marsh Lane, Ryehill

It forms part of the civil parish of Thorngumbald.

Ryhill was served from 1854 to 1964 by Burstwick railway station on the Hull and Holderness Railway.

The hamlet itself consists of 15 or so houses, and two main lanes that run through the hamlet are Marsh and Pitt Lanes (both of these are 30 mph). Ryehill is mainly known for its award-winning pub, The Crooked Billet (CAMRA Pub of the Year, 2007).

There are not a large number of minors in the hamlet, however those who are present attend Thorngumbald Primary school, usually followed by South Holderness Technology College (a large secondary school on the outskirts of Hedon). The crime rate is almost non-existent in the local area.

Ryehill is surrounded by fields and grazing land, but is within walking distance of the villages of Thorngumbald and Keyingham, both of which offer all the local amenities.

On 31 December 2021 Met Office spokesperson Stephen Dixon said the first reading taken at Ryehill in East Yorkshire at 11:00 GMT had "provisionally broken the New Year's Eve record… Our station at Ryehill in East Yorkshire has recorded 14.9C (58.8F) today, which tops the previous record of 14.8C (58.6F)."

The figure later rose to 15.8C (60.4F), last recorded at the Met Office's station in Merryfield in south-west Somerset.

== See also ==
- Listed buildings in Thorngumbald
