= All Saints' Church, Preston, East Riding of Yorkshire =

Church in Preston, East Riding of Yorkshire, England, UK

The church, in 2022

All Saints' Church is the parish church of Preston, East Riding of Yorkshire, a village in England.

The oldest part of the church is the north arcade, which dates from the 13th century, while the south arcade is 14th century. The north aisle, north chapel and tower were rebuilt in the 15th century, and the south aisle and clerestory around 1500. The church was restored around 1800, and the south door was rebuilt in 1828. The chancel was rebuilt in 1870, and the church was restored between 1878 and 1882 by Smith & Brodrick, the work including a new roof. The building was further restored around 1900, the roof was restored in 1964, and the tower in 1982. Nikolaus Pevsner describes the church as "large, with an impressive Perp W tower". The building has been grade I listed since 1966.

The church is built of limestone and cobble, partly rendered, and has a slate roof on the chancel and lead roofs elsewhere. It consists of a nave with a clerestory, north and south aisles, a chancel with a north organ chamber and vestry, and a west tower. The tower has four stages, a moulded plinth, angle buttresses with crocketed ogee gablets, moulded string courses, and a pointed west doorway with a crocketed ogee hood mould, and blank shields in relief above. The second stage has ogee niches and a west window with Perpendicular tracery, over which is a hood mould and a niche containing a statue. The third stage contains ogee-headed slit windows and clock faces, and above are twin three-light bell openings with hood moulds, gargoyles, a coped parapet with round-headed openings, and eight crocketed pinnacles. The nave and the aisle have embattled parapets.

Inside the church, there are a variety of monuments from the 16th century on. There is a 15th-century octagonal font, some fragments of a 15th-century alabaster relief, and the original oak south door, now kept in the vestry.

== See also ==
- Grade I listed buildings in the East Riding of Yorkshire
- Listed buildings in Preston, East Riding of Yorkshire
