= St Wilfrid's Church, Ottringham =

Church in Ottringham, East Riding of Yorkshire, England, UK

The church, in 2022

St Wilfrid's Church is the parish church of Ottringham, a village in the East Riding of Yorkshire, in England.

There was at least one church in Ottringham at the time of the Domesday Book. The oldest sections of the current building are parts of the nave and chancel, which date from the 12th century. Arcades were added in the 13th century, and a tower, south aisle and porch and other sections of the chancel early in the 14th century. In the 15th century, a north aisle, clerestory and south chapel were constructed. The chapel was repaired in the 17th and 18th centuries, and the spire in 1810. The chancel roof was replaced in 1824, and that of much of the rest of the church in 1843, while the building was restored around 1860, between 1901 and 1902, and in 1927. The building was grade I listed in 1966.

View from the nave into the chancel

The church is built in a variety of materials, including cobbles, limestone, and red brick, it is partly rendered, and has roofs of Welsh slate, pantile and lead. The church consists of a nave with a clerestory, north and south aisles, a south porch, a south transeptal chapel, a chancel and a west steeple. The steeple has a tower with five stages, a moulded plinth, diagonal buttresses, moulded string courses, a three-light pointed west window, slit lights, a clock face, two-light pointed bell openings and a corbelled out coped parapet, on which is a recessed octagonal broach spire with a finial and a weathervane. Inside, the 12th-century tower arch may originally have been the chancel arch. There is a piscina in the chancel, a 15th-century king post roof in the nave, a 15th-century octagonal font, and 18th-century box pews throughout.

== See also ==
- Grade I listed buildings in the East Riding of Yorkshire
- Listed buildings in Ottringham
