= Marfleet railway station =

Disused railway station in the East Riding of Yorkshire, England

Marfleet
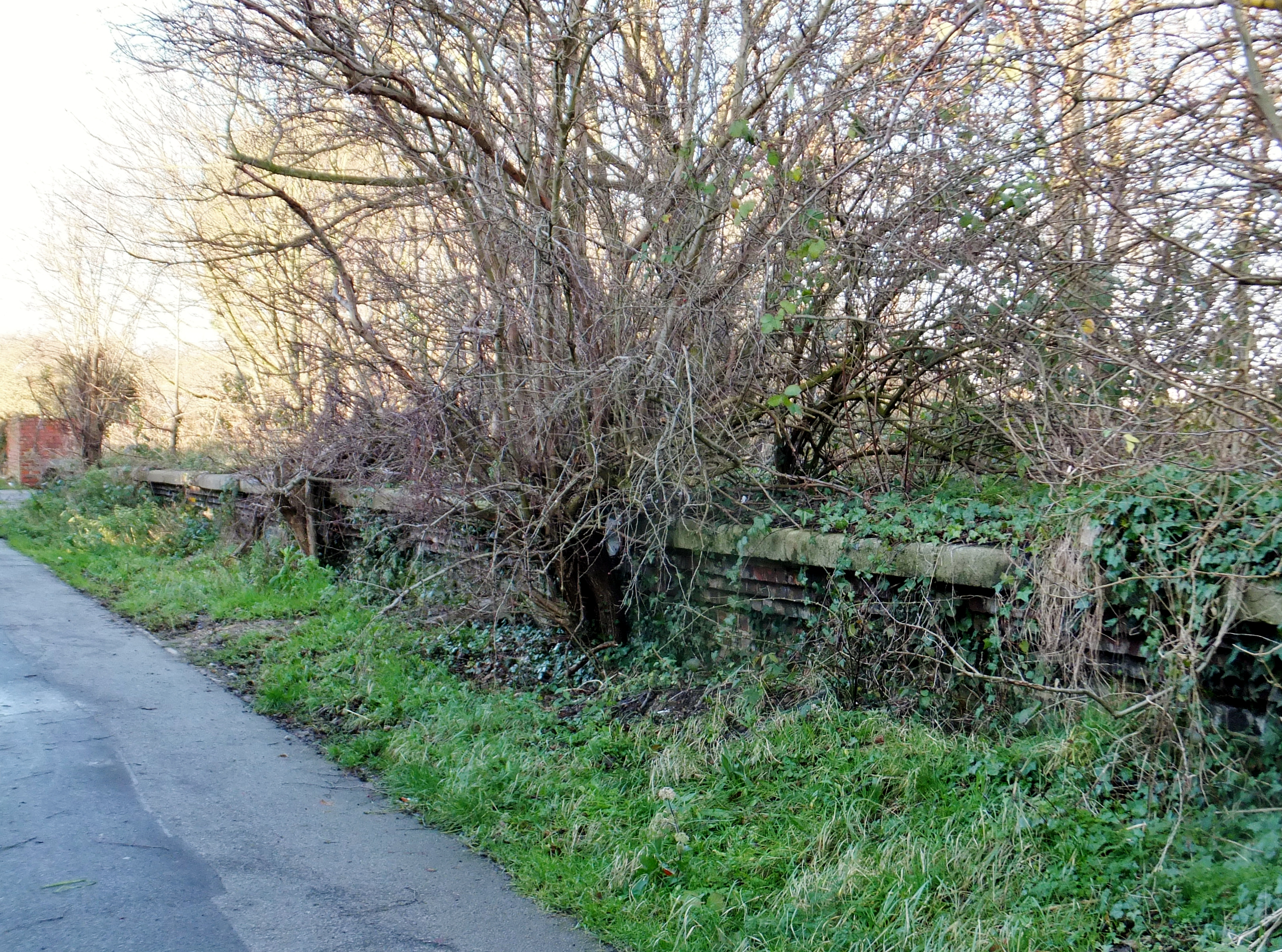
- A former platform of Marfleet station (2013)

General information
- Location: Hull, East Riding of Yorkshire; England
- Coordinates: 53.753000°N 0.272000°W
- Grid reference: TA140299
- Platforms: 2

Other information
- Status: Disused

History
- Original company: Hull and Holderness Railway
- Pre-grouping: North Eastern Railway
- Post-grouping: London and North Eastern Railway

Key dates
- 1854: Opened
- 1964: Closed to passengers
- 1 May 1972: closed for freight
Location

Marfleet railway station is a disused railway station on the North Eastern Railway's Hull and Holderness Railway in the Marfleet area of the city of Hull in the East Riding of Yorkshire, England. It was opened by the Hull and Holderness Railway on 27 June 1854. The station was closed to passengers on 19 October 1964 and to freight on 1 May 1972.

Preceding station	Disused railways	Following station
Southcoates	North Eastern Railway; Hull and Holderness Railway	Hedon Racecourse
Victoria Dock	North Eastern Railway; Hull and Holderness Railway	Hedon Racecourse
