= Burstwick =

English village and civil parish

Coordinates: 53°43′57″N 0°08′25″W

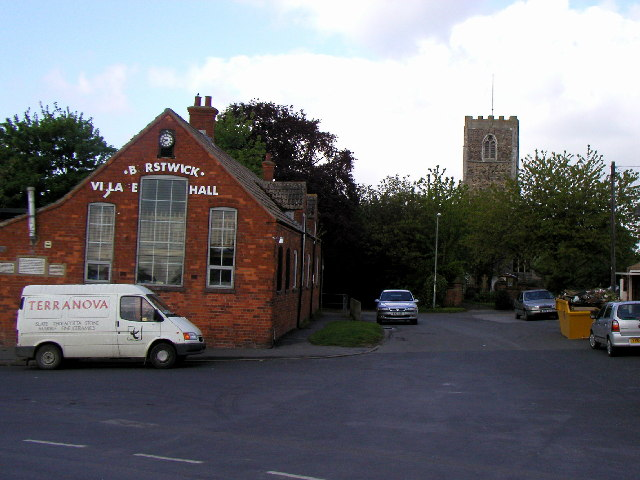
- Burstwick Village Hall

- Location within the East Riding of Yorkshire
- Population: 1,924 (2011 census)
- OS grid reference: TA227280
  - London: 155 mi (249 km) S
- Civil parish: Burstwick
- Unitary authority: East Riding of Yorkshire
- Ceremonial county: East Riding of Yorkshire
- Region: Yorkshire and the Humber
- Country: England
- Sovereign state: United Kingdom
- Post town: HULL
- Postcode district: HU12
- Dialling code: 01964
- Police: Humberside
- Fire: Humberside
- Ambulance: Yorkshire
- UK Parliament: Beverley and Holderness

Burstwick is a village and civil parish in the Holderness region of the East Riding of Yorkshire, England. It is situated about 8 miles (13 km) east of Hull city centre. It lies on the B1362 road.

== History ==
The name Burstwick derives from the Old English Brustiwīc meaning 'Brusti's trading settlement'.

Burstwick is described as a caput, or principal residence, in the Honour of Holderness, and is listed in the Domesday survey as one of twelve linked manors.

== Community ==
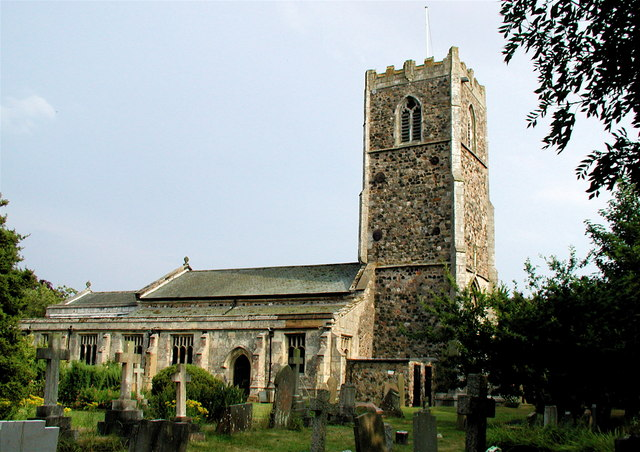
All Saints' Church

Burstwick is a few miles from the local market town of Hedon and the villages of Keyingham and Thorngumbald.

According to the 2011 UK census, Burstwick parish had a population of 1,924, an increase on the 2001 UK census figure of 1,813.

Burstwick was served from 1854 to 1964 by Burstwick railway station on the Hull and Holderness Railway.

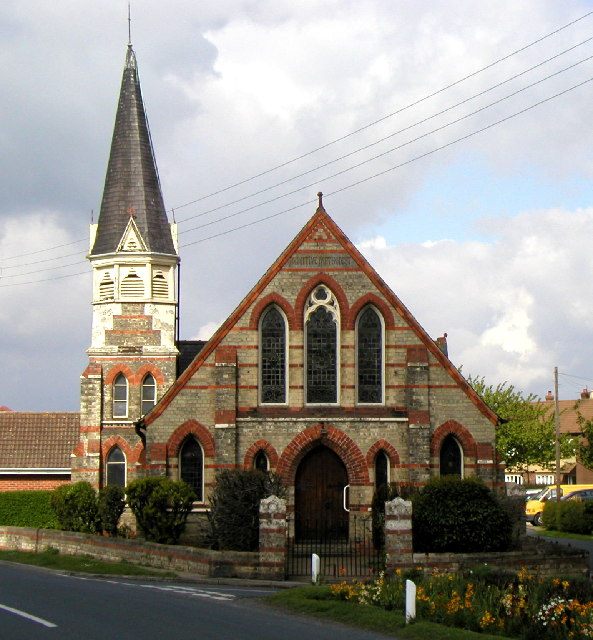
Burstwick Methodist Church

Some low-lying parts of Burstwick were affected by the June 2007 floods which hit most of the county. Several properties were vacated while repair work took place.

The closed All Saints' Church, Burstwick was designated a Grade I listed building in 1966 and is now recorded in the National Heritage List for England, maintained by Historic England. There is also a Methodist church.

To the north-west of the village is the site of Burstwick Castle which is an ancient scheduled monument.

== Amenities ==
Burstwick contains a public house, the Hare and Hounds and a fish and chip shop, both situated on the main street. Village businesses and services include a petrol station, a park and a village hall. An 18-hole golf course is about 1 mile (1.6 km) away.

The local primary school is Burstwick Community Primary School.

== See also ==
- Listed buildings in Burstwick
