= Rye Hill and Burstwick railway station =

Disused railway station in the East Riding of Yorkshire, England

Rye Hill and Burstwick
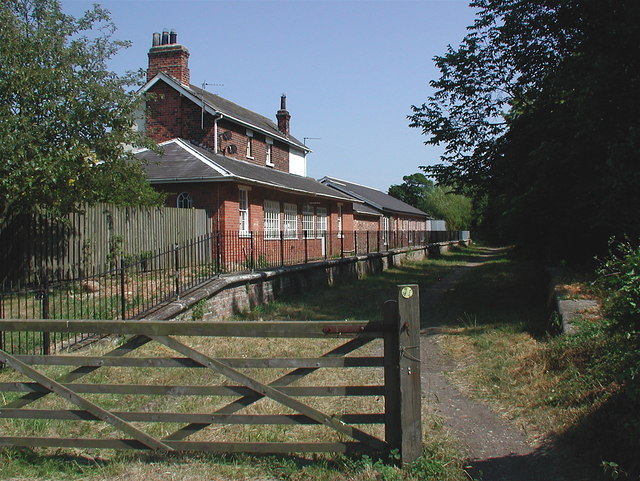
- Station House, Burstwick in 2006

General information
- Location: Burstwick & Ryehill, East Riding of Yorkshire; England
- Coordinates: 53.7254°N 0.1460°W
- Grid reference: TA224270
- Platforms: 2

Other information
- Status: Disused

History
- Original company: Hull and Holderness Railway
- Pre-grouping: North Eastern Railway
- Post-grouping: London and North Eastern Railway

Key dates
- 1854: Opened
- 1881: Renamed
- 1929: Renamed
- 1964: Closed
Location

Rye Hill and Burstwick railway station is a disused railway station on the North Eastern Railway's Hull and Holderness Railway midway between Burstwick and Ryehill in the East Riding of Yorkshire, England. It was opened by the Hull and Holderness Railway on 27 June 1854. On 1 July 1881 it was renamed to Rye Hill and on 23 September 1929 changed name again this time to Rye Hill and Burstwick. The station was closed to passengers on 19 October 1964. It is now a private residence.

Preceding station	Disused railways	Following station
Hedon	North Eastern Railway; Hull and Holderness Railway	Keyingham
