= The Market Weighton School =

Coordinates: 53.8672°N 0.6561°W

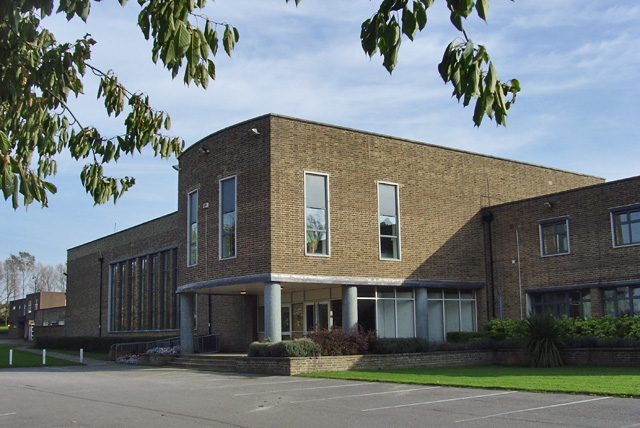
- Aspect from Spring Road (2008)

Location
- Spring Road; Market Weighton; East Riding of Yorkshire, YO43 3JF; England

Information
- Type: Community school
- Local authority: East Riding of Yorkshire Council
- Department for Education URN: 118076 Tables
- Ofsted: Reports
- Head Teacher: Richard Harrison
- Gender: Coeducational
- Age: 11 to 16
- Enrolment: 631
- Website: https://www.themarketweightonschool.co.uk/

The Market Weighton School is a coeducational secondary school located in Market Weighton in the East Riding of Yorkshire, England.

It is a community school administered by East Riding of Yorkshire Council. The school offers GCSEs and BTECs as programmes of study for pupils.
