= Victoria Dock railway station =

Disused railway station in the East Riding of Yorkshire, England

Victoria Dock
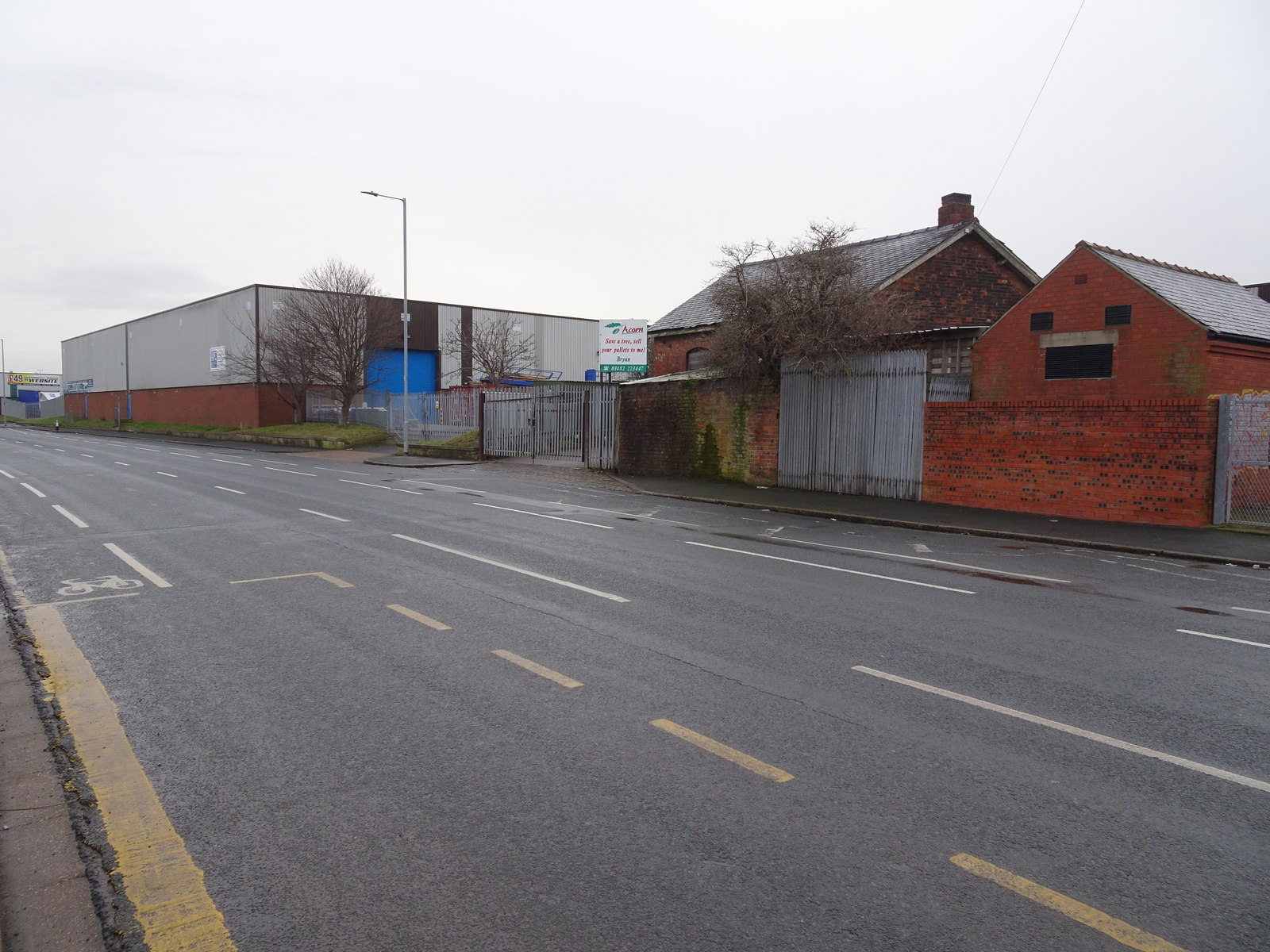
- The site of the station in 2018

General information
- Location: Kingston upon Hull; England
- Coordinates: 53.7458°N 0.3168°W
- Grid reference: TA11092902

Other information
- Status: Disused

History
- Original company: York and North Midland Railway

Key dates
- 1 June 1853: Opened
- 1 June 1864: Closed
Location

Victoria Dock railway station (also known as Victoria station) was the terminus of the York and North Midland Railway's Victoria Dock Branch Line in Kingston upon Hull, East Riding of Yorkshire, England.

It was opened by the York and North Midland Railway on 1 June 1853 and was closed to passengers on 1 June 1864.

The station remained in use as Drypool Goods station, (Note: Also known as "Drypool Victoria Docks goods". Not to be confused with the "Drypool Goods (Coal Yard)" (to the north, near Seward Street).) with much of the station structure removed by the early 1900s. Some station office buildings adjacent to Hedon Road remained until the 1980s.

== History ==
In 1853, the Victoria Dock Branch Line was opened by the York and North Midland Railway (Y&NMR) to serve the new Victoria Dock (1850). William Botterill was employed by the Y&NMR to design the stations on the branch.

In January 1853 the company planned to build a goods shed at the dock, with the intention to use it temporarily for passengers. A station to Botterill's design was approved in the following months and later that year the Hull and Holderness Railway became a joint user of the station on agreeing to pay half the cost for its development.

Initially a temporary station was built. (Note: 53.745325°N 0.317566°W) (Note: Fawcett (2001, p. 88) identifies (on the 1:056 Town plan of 1856) a building south of the final station as the site of the station.) The Y&NMR and Hull&Holderness agreed to share the costs of a larger permanent station in mid 1854. The station was constructed on the south side of Hedon Road, between Emily and Williamson streets. (Note: 53.745759°N 0.316779°W)

The station was used by passenger services on the Victoria Dock Branch from 1853 to 1854, and by the Hull and Holderness Railway till 1864.

The station site was later used for freight, as the Drypool Goods station. In the late 1880s the NER contracted the construction of a goods shed at the station. Much of the passenger station had been by removed by 1910, leaving some station buildings facing onto Hedon Road.

During the Hull Blitz the station was hit by bombs three times, with the station's stables set on fire on one occasion.

Remnants of the passenger station buildings remained up to the 1980s.

Preceding station	Disused railways	Following station
Terminus	Victoria Dock Branch Line	Southcoates
Terminus	Hull and Holderness Railway	Marfleet
