= Preston, East Riding of Yorkshire =

Village and civil parish in the East Riding of Yorkshire, England

Coordinates: 53.756611°N 0.196915°W

Preston
- Location within the East Riding of Yorkshire
- Population: 3,258 (2011 census)
- OS grid reference: TA189304
- Civil parish: Preston
- Unitary authority: East Riding of Yorkshire
- Ceremonial county: East Riding of Yorkshire
- Region: Yorkshire and the Humber
- Country: England
- Sovereign state: United Kingdom
- Post town: HULL
- Postcode district: HU12
- Dialling code: 01482
- Police: Humberside
- Fire: Humberside
- Ambulance: Yorkshire
- UK Parliament: Beverley and Holderness

Preston is a village and civil parish in the East Riding of Yorkshire, England, in an area known as Holderness. It is situated approximately 6 miles (10 km) east of Hull city centre it lies just north of the A1033 road on the crossroads between the B1240 and B1362 roads.

The civil parish is formed by the village of Preston and the hamlet of Salt End.

According to the 2011 UK census, Preston parish had a population of 3,258, an increase on the 2001 UK census figure of 3,100.

The name Preston derives from the Old English prēosttūn meaning 'settlement of the priest'.

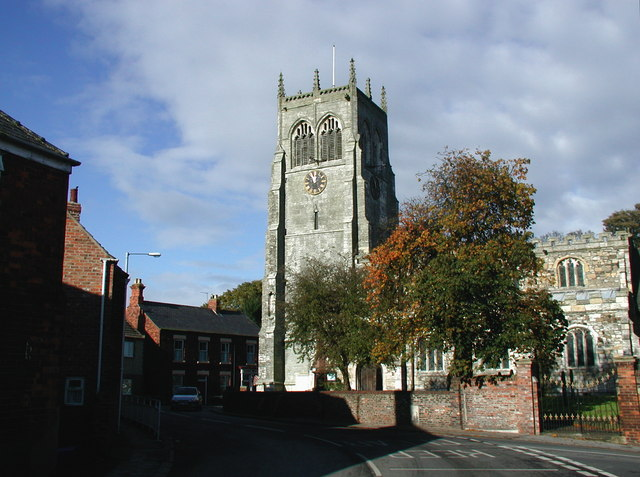
All Saints Church

The Anglican All Saints' Church, Preston is a Grade I listed building.

There is both a primary school (Preston Primary School) and a secondary school, which achieved Technology College status in 1997, and has a sixth form facility joined onto the school, in Preston. South Holderness Technology College converted to an academy known as Holderness Academy and serves the surrounding villages of Paull, Hedon, Bilton, Skirlaugh, Keyingham, Thorngumbald, Aldbrough, West Newton, Burton Constable, Sproatley and others.

Preston has two pubs, a pizza takeaway, a Chinese takeaway and a garden centre, with a farm shop. There is also a butcher's shop on the main street, along with the Post Office, the Post Office has closed but the shop remains. It also has a hairdressers and a traditional barbers shop.

Recently 'Preston (South)' was marked clearly by the council, however the two are not geographically all that close, and still stand as two separate areas separated in places by Hedon.

In February 2023, a £9.6 million crematorium, run by East Riding of Yorkshire Council, opened off Sproatley Road.

== See also ==
- Listed buildings in Preston, East Riding of Yorkshire
