= Salt End =

Hamlet in the East Riding of Yorkshire, England

Coordinates: 53.744081°N 0.233846°W

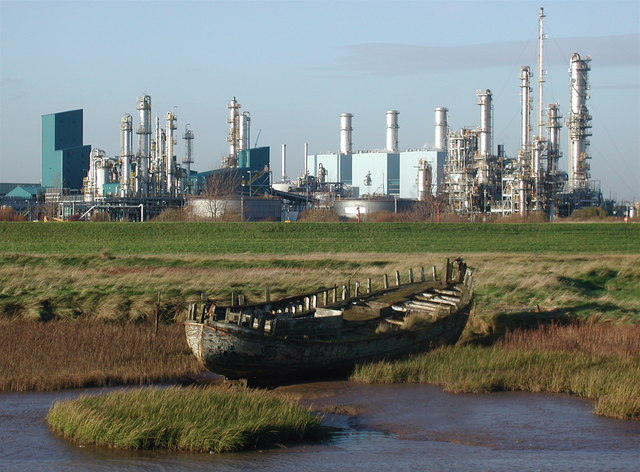
- Salt End Power Station

- Location within the East Riding of Yorkshire
- OS grid reference: TA165289
- Civil parish: Preston
- Unitary authority: East Riding of Yorkshire
- Ceremonial county: East Riding of Yorkshire
- Region: Yorkshire and the Humber
- Country: England
- Sovereign state: United Kingdom
- Post town: HULL
- Postcode district: HU12
- Dialling code: 01482
- Police: Humberside
- Fire: Humberside
- Ambulance: Yorkshire
- UK Parliament: Beverley and Holderness

Salt End or Saltend is a hamlet in the East Riding of Yorkshire, England, in an area known as Holderness. It is situated on the north bank of the Humber Estuary just outside the Hull eastern boundary on the A1033 road. It forms part of the civil parish of Preston.

Salt End is dominated by a chemical park owned by PX group, and a gas-fired power station owned by Triton Power. Chemicals produced at Salt End include acetic acid, acetic anhydride, ammonia, bio-butanol, bio-ethanol, ethyl acetate (ETAC) and ethylene-vinyl alcohol copolymer (EVOH) with animal feed also being produced on site.

== Industry ==
=== History ===
The site was opened in May 1914 when the North Eastern Railway Company built jetties connected to its railway system 1 mile (1.6 km) east of King George Dock. The first ship to dock there was carrying 3,000 imperial gallons (14,000 L; 3,600 US gal) of benzene and thereafter, oil came to be imported at the site with the Asiatic Petroleum Company (Shell) and the Anglo Mexican Company (Shell Mex) with BP joining the site in 1921.

In 1930 the site was expanded to produce acetic acids from alcohol which were eventually closed down by BP in 1990. In April 1967, BP bought the distillery at Salt End outright. In 1989, Air Products and Yara started operations on the site with Air Products providing raw material for use on site and Yara producing ammonia which it started shipping around Europe.

In 2000, the 94-mile (151 km) Teesside to Saltend pipeline was opened which transports ethylene to Saltend to be used on site. In March 2007, BP Announced the sale of their Vinyl acetate monomer (VAM) and Ethyl acetate (ETAC) plants to Ineos Oxides which also included ownership and maintenance of the ethylene pipeline from Teesside. In 2009, BP created the Saltend Chemicals Park[sic], which covers an area of 370 acres (150 ha) and they continued to manage the site until March 2017 when Teesside based PX Group took over the day to day running of the park. The Humber industrial region emits 12 million tonnes of CO_{2} per year; the biggest in the UK. As of 2024, Salt End is ranked among the top 50 largest industrial parks by total investment.

=== BP Chemical works ===
The BP acetyl plants at Salt End produce about 900,000 tonnes (890,000 long tons; 990,000 short tons) of acetic acid and acetic anhydride per year, making BP the largest producer of these chemicals in Europe. Acetic acid is used in VAM, PTA esters and other intermediates and acetic anhydride is used in cellulose acetate and chemical derivatives.

=== INEOS ===
INEOS bought out the vinyl acetate monomer (VAM) and Ethyl acetate (ETAC) plants from BP in March 2007. The VAM plant was closed down in 2013 with the loss of 18 jobs. INEOS had invested £40 million in the plant but it couldn't make a profit against cheaper imports from the United States and Saudi Arabia. The Ethyl acetate (ETAC) is still in production with ETAC being used in printing inks, glues, paints, packaging, cosmetics and pharmaceuticals.

=== Vivergo Fuels ===
Vivergo Fuels was a joint venture between BP, Associated British Foods and DuPont, with a 500,000 tonnes (550,000 tons) per year wheat-to-bioethanol plant at Saltend (although BP later sold its stake to Associated British Foods which gave them a 94% stake in the company). After completion in 2012 the unit was intended to be the largest such plant in the UK and the 5th largest in Europe, but design and commissioning issues affected output in 2013. The bioethanol produced is blended into petrol.

Vivergo's construction was the subject of industrial action in March–April 2011 resulting from the termination of a contract with Redhall Engineering. Construction was delayed for several months, but in August 2011 it restarted. Protests at the gate of the Salt End site were heavily policed owing to severe disruption of the site and the road network to the east of Kingston upon Hull. The plant's closure was announced in September 2018 with lower than expected market demand for ethanol in petrol fuel due to the UK government maintaining the mandated blend at 5% by volume rather than increasing to 10% as had been expected. But in February 2021 it was announced that the plant would be restarted after the UK Government stated that E10 fuel would be introduced from September 2021.

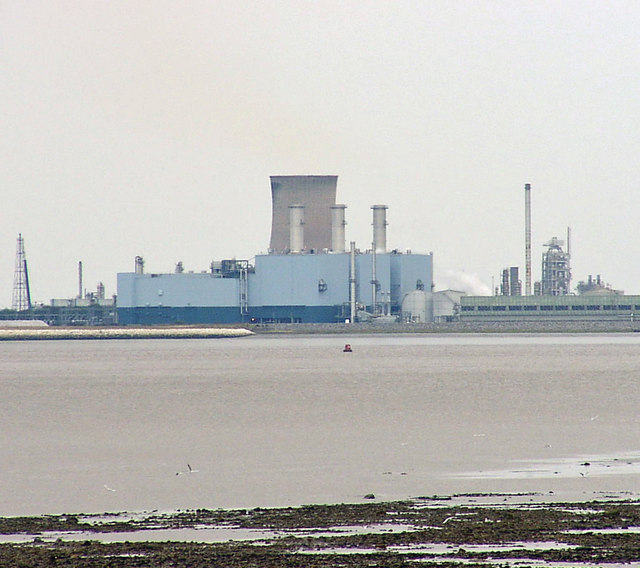
Salt End Power Station seen from Goxhill Haven

=== Salt End cogeneration plant ===
Salt End Power Station was commissioned in 2000 by Entergy an American power generator. It was later sold to Calpine Corporation, also an American power generator, in August 2001 for £562 million. In July 2005, Salt End was sold to International Power and Mitsui (70:30 share) for £500 million. The site was built by Mitsubishi (MHI) and Raytheon.

The station is run on gas using single shaft 3 × Mitsubishi 701F gas Turbines machines with Alstom 400 MWe generators. The station has a total output of 1,200 MW; of that 100 MW is allocated to supply BP Chemicals. Each gas turbine has a Babcock Borsig Power (BBP) heat recovery steam generator, which all lead to one steam turbine per unit (single shaft machine means Gas turbine and Steam Turbine are on the same shaft). The waste product of electricity generation is steam at the rate of about 120 tonnes/h which is sold to BP Chemicals to use in their process. This makes Salt End one of the most efficient power stations in the UK. The plant is scheduled to use hydrogen from steam reformed natural gas for 30% of its power.

=== Waste incineration ===
In June 2009 the Environment Agency issued an environmental permit to Waste Recycling Group for a non-hazardous waste incinerator at Queen Elizabeth Dock, Saltend. The plant is an energy from waste facility, which will burn waste at high temperatures and use the energy to generate electricity which was later backtracked due to strong opposition from the local town of Hedon with the fear of toxic fumes.

=== Yorkshire Water ===
North of the A1033 and away from the main Saltend Chemicals Park, is Yorkshire Water's waste water treatment works. Although Yorkshire Water invested £30 million in October 2015 to improve the odours emanating from the plant, local people in Preston and Hedon have employed solicitors to bring about legal action over the smell.

=== Nippon Gohsei ===
Nippon Gohsei produce ethyl-vinyl alcohol copolymer (EVOH) on site. The EVOH line at Salt End is the largest in the world and is marketed under the brand name SOARNOL. The product is an alternative packing material composed of carbon, oxygen and hydrogen. When the product enters into the waste stream, it causes no toxic gases when burnt and only burns at half the temperature of polyethylene.

=== Pensana ===
In July 2021, clearance works were started on a new factory designed to process rare earth metals mined in Africa. Pensana Salt End would seek to focus on producing neodymium and praseodymium oxide.
