= Holderness Academy =

English secondary school

Holderness Academy and Sixth Form College
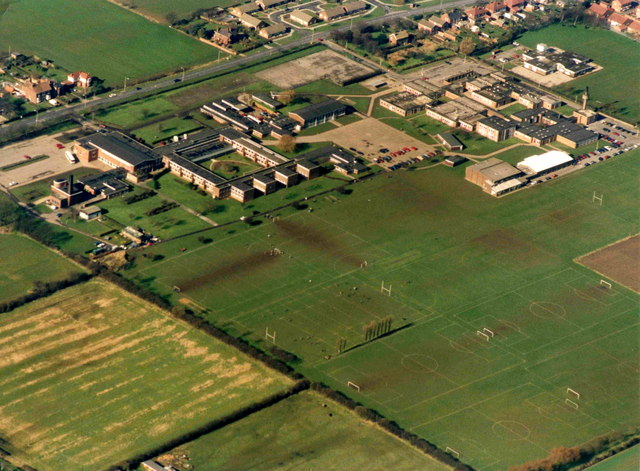
- Preston, East Riding of Yorkshire; England

Information
- Type: Secondary school
- Established: 1 October 2018
- Trust: The Consortium Academy Trust
- Department for Education URN: 145722 Tables
- Ofsted: Reports
- Chair: Mike Kitching
- Head teacher: Neal Holder
- Gender: Mixed
- Age: 11 to 18
- Enrolment: 1,101 (March 2023)
- Capacity: 1,390
- Website: www.holderness.academy

Holderness Academy and Sixth Form College is an English secondary school in the East Riding of Yorkshire for pupils aged 11–18.

== History ==
In Preston, East Riding of Yorkshire, the Holderness Academy and Sixth Form College opened on 1 October 2018.

== Operation ==
The school is a secondary school that teaches students of both genders from ages 11 through 16. As of March 2023, the school had 1,101 pupils out of a 1,390 capacity (79%), 211 of whom were eligible for free school meals. The headteacher was Neal Holder.

As of September 2023, the school was governed by a ten-person board (chaired by Mike Kitching). Each served a three-year term, and two were elected by parents. It is sponsored by The Consortium Academy Trust.

== Controversy ==
The school came under criticism in September 2023 after putting a pupil in isolation for wearing the wrong brand of uniform skirt. School policy requires students buy skirts from an official supplier for £18 (equivalent to £18.81 in 2025); the pupil was instead wearing an identical skirt from a supermarket that cost £8 (equivalent to £8.36 in 2025). The school defended the policy, saying it had been clearly communicated to families.
