= Hull and Holderness Railway =

Former railway in the East Riding of Yorkshire, England

The Hull and Holderness Railway was a branch line in the East Riding of Yorkshire, England that connected the city of Kingston upon Hull with the seaside resort of Withernsea via the town of Hedon and the villages of Keyingham and Patrington.

== History ==
=== Background ===
An early proposal for a railway eastwards from Hull into Holderness was made in 1845 by the York and North Midland Railway for a line from a junction on a line to the east Dock (Victoria Dock) at Drypool to Patrington via Hedon; the Patrington line was not included in the resultant acts of 1846. (Note: York and North Midland Railway (East Riding Branches) (No. 1) Act 1846 (9 & 10 Vict. c. 65); and the York and North Midland Railway (East Riding Branches) (No. 2) Act 1846 (9 & 10 Vict. c. 66))

A second attempt at a line was promoted by Hull businessman Anthony Bannister, with the intention of linking Hull with the rich agricultural area of South Holderness, and the development of a coastal village (Withernsea) into a new seaside resort. The silting up of Patrington and Hedon Havens was another incentive for the construction of a line, since it could no longer be used for transportation by water.

Hull and Holderness Railway Act 1853
- Act of Parliament
- Parliament of the United Kingdom
- Long title: An Act to incorporate a Company for making a Railway from Kingston-upon-Hull to or near to Withernsea in Holderness, with a Branch therefrom; and for other Purposes.
- Citation: 16 & 17 Vict. c. xciii

Dates
- Royal assent: 8 July 1853

Text of statute as originally enacted

A prospectus was issued in 1852, and the Hull and Holderness Railway Act 1853 (16 & 17 Vict. c. xciii) was passed the following year. Construction of the line in the flat and open Holderness plain was rapid and the line of about 18 miles (29 km) was opened on 24 June 1854. (Note: The date of opening was somewhere between 24 and 27 June depending on source.)

=== Description and operations ===
The line was originally built as a single track line, except sections at Hedon and near Ryehill. At Withernsea (which in 1851 had a population of only 109) a hotel, the "Station Hotel" (later called "Queen's Hotel") was built.

The line began at the York and North Midland Railway's Victoria Dock station and ran east, passing Hedon to the north; it then turned south-east, passing Burstwick to the south, halfway between Ottringham and Ryehill, then the line passed Keyingham to the north and then east and south to Patrington, before entering Withernsea, which was to the north-east, and in which the line terminated.

North-eastern Railway Company's (Hull and Holderness Amalgamation) Act 1862
- Act of Parliament
- Parliament of the United Kingdom
- Long title: An Act for dissolving the Hull and Holderness Railway Company, and vesting its Undertaking in and uniting its Shareholders with those of the North-eastern Railway Company; and for other Purposes.
- Citation: 25 & 26 Vict. c. cxx

Dates
- Royal assent: 7 July 1862

Text of statute as originally enacted

Up until 1859 the Hull and Holderness Railway operated its own trains, but from 1860 the line was operated by the North Eastern Railway on lease rental, and the same company acquired the line via the North-eastern Railway Company's (Hull and Holderness Amalgamation) Act 1862 (25 & 26 Vict. c. cxx); a short connecting chord was built that allowed trains to run through onto the dock branch, and, from 1864, services ran to Paragon station in the city centre via the Victoria Dock Branch Line.

=== Closure ===
Passenger service ended following the Beeching Report. The last passenger train ran on 19 October 1964. Goods traffic continued to use the whole line until 3 May 1965, after which it only operated between Hull and Hedon railway station. This service continued until 3 June 1968, the goods service to Marfleet lasting until 1972.

== Line post closure ==
Most of the trackbed remains, and parts of it have become a footpath. The Queen's Hotel in Withernsea became a convalescence home. Most of the station buildings have become private residences, with the exception of Withernsea station and Hollym Gate which have been demolished.

== See also ==
- Hull and Hornsea Railway
