= A1033 road =

Road in the East Riding of Yorkshire, England

Coordinates: 53.7109°N 0.1353°W

A1033

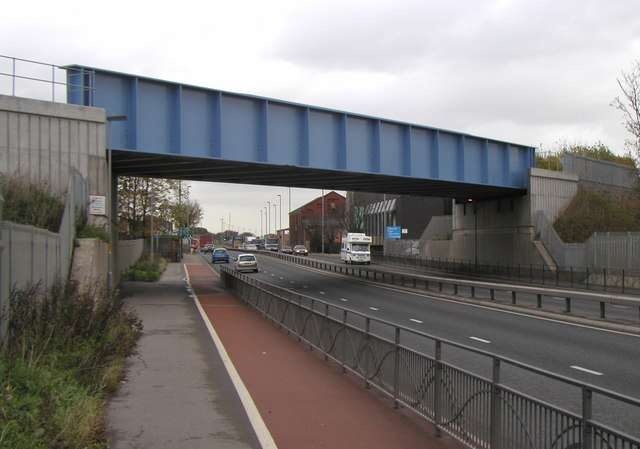
- The New Hedon Road railway bridge

Route information
- Length: 24 mi (39 km)

Major junctions
- West end: Dunswell
- A1079 A1174 A1165 A165; A63
- East end: Withernsea

Location
- Country: United Kingdom

Road network
- Roads in the United Kingdom; Motorways; A and B road zones
← A1032	→ A1034

The A1033 road is a main arterial route across Kingston upon Hull and the East Riding of Yorkshire connecting Hull with Withernsea. The road carries traffic to and from the Port of Hull and Salt End at its western end, and local and holiday traffic at its eastern end. It is a primary route from the junction of the A63 road to the Salt End roundabout and is maintained on that section by National Highways. The section by the docks is also part of a designated abnormal load route.

The section northwards from the A63 junction to Dunswell, is known to have traffic problems.

== Route details ==
The route starts at the junction of the A1174 road and the A1079 road, heading east across the River Hull, and staying on the eastern bank of the river south towards Drypool.

The section of dual carriageway between the A63 in Hull to the roundabout at Salt End, is designated as a trunk road, one of only two in the East Riding of Yorkshire. The trunk road section is maintained by National Highways, with the East Riding of Yorkshire Council maintaining the non-trunk route from Salt End to Withernsea. The road is the primary route connecting the north and York to the Port of Hull, and as such, the section between the A63 junction and the A1079 junction is subject to congestion. A small section of road into and out of the Port of Hull is an abnormal load route to and from Beverley along the A165 road.

As the road runs eastwards by the Port of Hull, it has two cycle paths on either side. The northern path is for local access, but has a connection with the National Cycle Network Route 66, and the southern path goes into the docks and is part of the Trans Pennine Trail.

As the road leaves Salt End, it cuts to the south of Hedon. The old road used to go through Hedon, but traffic levels prompted the building of a bypass in the late 1980s.

== History ==
The section of road between Hedon and Patrington, was repaired considerably under a Parliamentary bill for a turnpike between the two locations in 1761. The section between Hedon and Hull was a new turnpike road that followed the more direct route between the two places, but was not opened until 1833.

A section of the road by the Port of Hull was used in a very early trial of stone mastic asphalt (SMA). The site was chosen because it was a heavily trafficked route with lorries going to and from the docks. Sections of SMA were laid in 1991 and 1993 as part of a trial into preventing deformation of the road under heavy traffic conditions. In 2003, a new 4.2-mile (6.7 km) section of dual carriageway was opened between the junction with the A63 and Salt End roundabout (the trunk road section). The Highways Agency approved scheme cost over £40 million and was part of a TPI (Targeted Programme of Improvements) as the A1033 was subject to congestion due to the extra port traffic. The new road was built alongside the existing single carriageway, with it being just to the south, and so became the westbound section of the dual carriageway. The works included a flyover at Salt End.

A Eurorap survey carried between 2012 and 2014, rated the section from the junction of the A63 road to Withernsea as being a low medium risk road, with the section from the A63 north to the A1079 road as being a medium risk road. In 2014, a scheme to add a dedicated lane for ferry traffic into the Port of Hull was opened at a cost of £590,000.

In October 2019, it was announced that a 1,300 feet (400 m) stretch of the coastline at Withernsea would be given new sea defences in a scheme worth over £5 million. The defences will also prolong the life of the A1033 as it enters the town from the south quite close to the coastline.
