= Hedon Haven =

River and port in the East Riding of Yorkshire, England

Hedon Haven River Hedon Hedon Fleet (Note: The water between Burstwick and Hedon has had many names; River Hedon; Burstwick Drain; Hedon Fleet; Humbleton Beck; Scurthdike.)
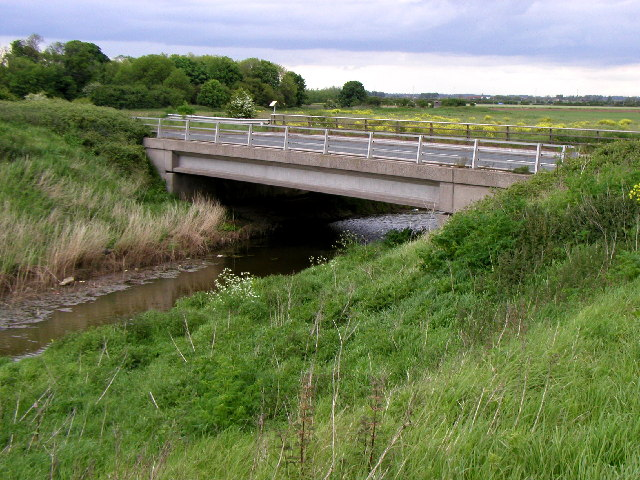
- The bridge over Hedon Haven on the road from Hull to Paull

Location
- Town: Hedon
- County: East Riding of Yorkshire
- Country: England

Physical characteristics
- Source
  - location: Elstronwick
  - coordinates: 53.7596°N 0.1310°W
  - elevation: 16 feet (5 m)
- Mouth
  - location: Paull
  - coordinates: 53.7275°N 0.2363°W
  - elevation: 0 feet (0 m)
- Length: 2 mi (3.2 km)(Hedon Haven); 5.6 miles (9 km) (Burstwick Drain)

Basin features
- River system: Humber Estuary
- Inland ports: Hedon (closed 1970)

Hedon Haven is a waterway that connected the Humber Estuary with the port of Hedon, in Holderness, East Riding of Yorkshire, England. The waterway allowed ships to unload at the port in Hedon, which was also known as Hedon Haven and had, at its peak, three canalised arms that stretched into the town. The port at Hedon was the main port for south Holderness between the 12th and 13th centuries, and was the busiest port in Holderness before the docks at Hull were built.

The port suffered several downturns in business, first with the siltation of the waterways, then being eclipsed by the newer docks at Hull. Later with the building of the turnpike road through Hedon, and when the railway connecting Hull with Withernsea was opened, port traffic went into a decline. After the waterway kept silting up, the decision was taken in the 1970s to abandon the haven and fill parts of it in. Large swathes encircling the town are designated as a scheduled monument, including the previous areas of canalised waterways, whilst the main area of the haven to the south of the town, is designated as a conservation area.

The western end of Hedon Haven still exists as an outfall into the Humber Estuary, and this watercourse is fed by the Burstwick Drain (Humbleton Beck) and other smaller becks and streams. Ordnance Survey (OS) mapping shows Hedon Haven starting just west of the town of Hedon, whereas the county council state that the term Hedon Haven only applies to the watercourse in its tidal reach. In antiquity, the river feeding the watercourse was known as the River Hedon and the Haven, was the canalised sections around the town of Hedon used as port facilities.

A plan that was formulated in the 21st century, has proposed the revival of the haven as a pleasure waterway with a marina and a country park located at the southern end of Hedon.

== Course ==
The Hedon Haven was essentially a drain for the River Hedon, which rose at Burstwick and travelled past Hedon westwards towards the Humber Estuary. From Hedon to the Humber was described as a "long and winding creek", that extended for 2 miles (3.2 km). A large part of the former River Hedon east of the town, is now known as the Burstwick Drain, and is maintained by the South Holderness Internal Drainage Board. The waterway that is west of Hedon now forms the border between Salt End, Hedon and Paull in its lower reaches, and was furnished with a swing bridge on the road to Paull. Due to flooding in Burstwick and Hedon in 2007, the Environment Agency agreed to undertake a dredge of the 1.2 miles (1.9 km) from Salt End to Hedon.

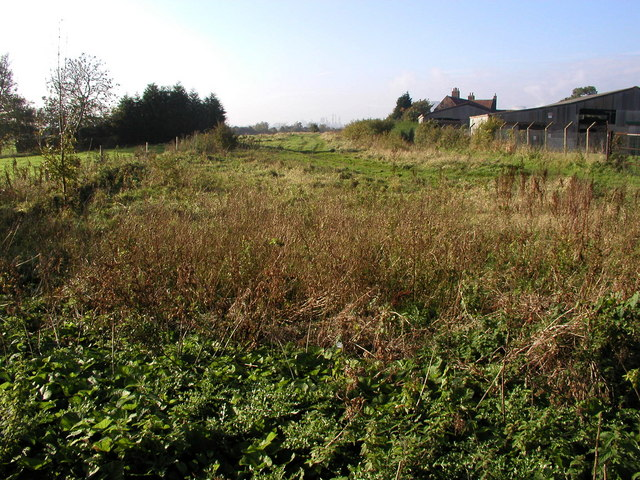
Hedon Haven; this is looking west with the southern edge of Hedon on the right.

Historically, the river/drain has had many names, with either the River Hedon, Hedon Fleet, Burstwick Drain, or Burstwick Old Drain being most common. This waterway approached Hedon from the east then turned north, then west in a horseshoe shape to enter the edge of the medieval town from the north, picking up several smaller watercourses on the way. This ran alongside the eastern edge of town as The Fleet, and the Hedon Haven started when the watercourse turned a sharp 90° degrees to the west. The Fleet was navigable as far as the northern edge of town (though records exist of ships transiting to Burstwick), and was expanded under a 1774 Act of Parliament. Essentially, Hedon Haven referred to the tidal reach up to the port of Hedon and of the three canalised arms that encircled the town; the western haven (the Fore Bank, which curved around the town to a point where the old railway station was located), a central haven (The Fleet) which had the majority of the wharfage and was fed by the River Hedon from the north, the eastern haven, which bordered St Nicholas Church, and the southern haven, which all other sections fed into and was isolated from its headwaters in the early 1800s when a new cut of the Burstwick Drain was made through the town.

Between 1802 and 1807, the Keyingham Internal Drainage Board employed William Chapman to create a new cut in the watercourse, and it was diverted to approach Hedon from the east directly and ran alongside the very southern edge of the town. This has been suggested as at the same time as the Keyingham Drainage Board's redirection of some of the other streams, so that the Keyingham Fleet went due south to the Humber with much of the headwaters of the River Hedon being sent to sea via the Keyingham Fleet (or Drain). The result of directing much of the water away from Hedon Haven was a lack of the scouring action on the riverbed, which then allowed silt to build up. (Note: Siltation of the Keyingham Fleet meant that the area known as Sunk Island became less prone to being swamped by tides and as salt-marsh vegetation took hold, humans intervened and built the land up so that Sunk Island is now part of the mainland of Holderness proper, as opposed to being in the middle of the Humber Estuary.)

== History ==
The town of Hedon is not mentioned in the Domesday Book, (Note: Hedon's exclusion from the Domesday Book could be because the town never existed. Some have noted that the Domesday Book only referred to manorial holdings (in this case Preston and therefore, at the time of the survey, a settlement could have existed at Hedon, but developed later when the inland port was opened.) yet by the 12th century, its port was the eleventh busiest in England. The haven, as the name suggests, was also a sheltering place for boats sitting out of the tidal estuary. Efforts were made to improve the connection between the town and the Humber Estuary, and in the 12th century, a new cut of the haven was made which extended for 1.5 miles (2.4 km). This new cut provided the best route into Hedon from the west, as the land between Hedon and what is now Kingston upon Hull, was marshy and was riddled with creeks. The only overland travellers to Hedon were from the north and the east. Many writers have suggested different dates for the founding of the town, but it is believed that it was created in the early 12th century by the Earls of Aumale.

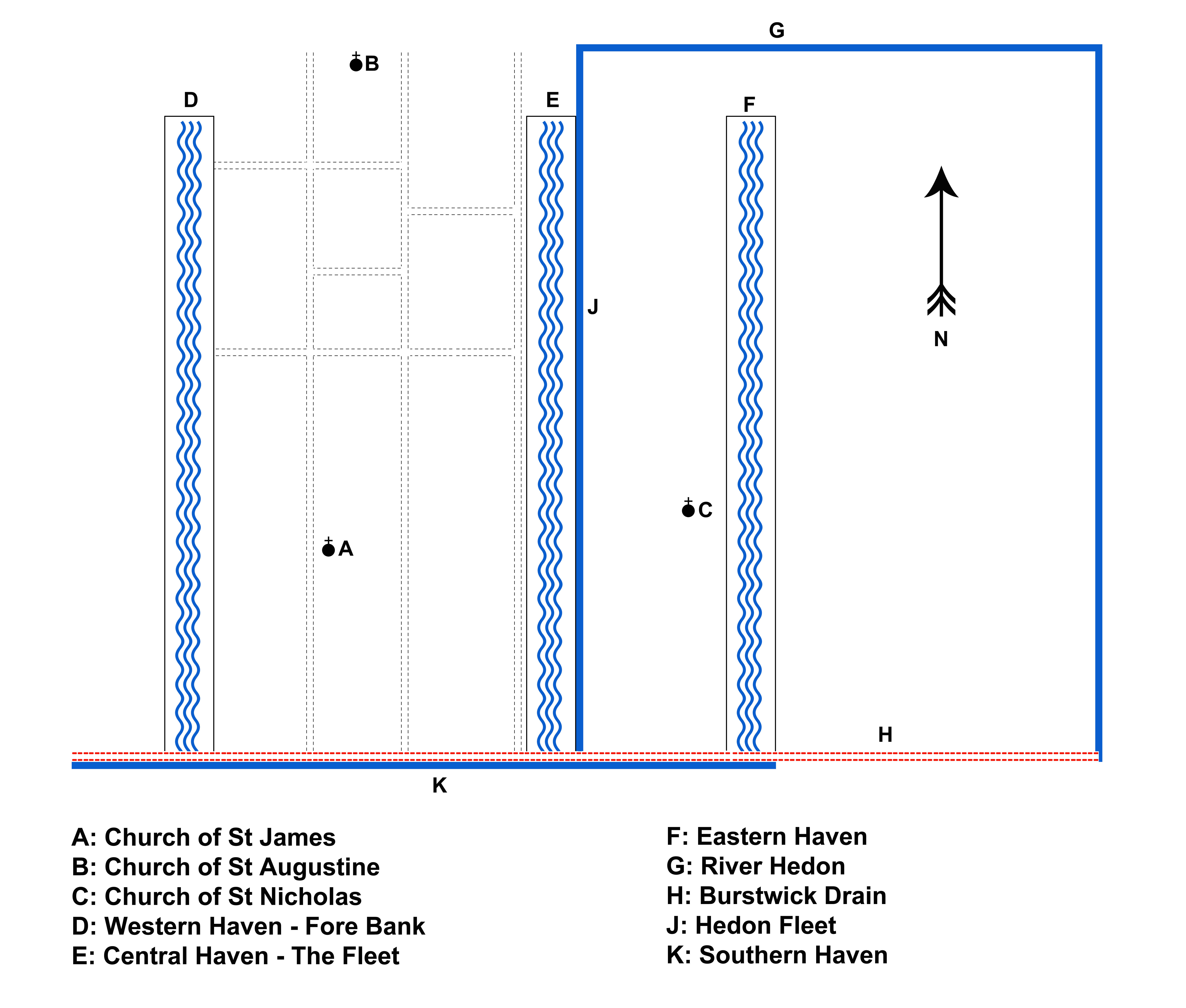
A diagram showing the layout of Hedon circa 1500-1660. This is before the Burstwick Drain was redirected from the River Hedon. The Fore bank was 650 yards (590 m), The Fleet 450 yards (410 m), the eastern arm 830 yards (760 m) and the southern haven 440 yards (400 m).

The location of the port gave immediate rise to the prominence and importance of Hedon; it returned two Members of Parliament and had four churches, St Augustines, St Mary Magdalen, St Nicholas and St James. St Nicholas was built on the left bank of the most eastern of the three canalised arms. As the fortunes of the town waned in favour of the other Humber ports, only St Augustine's Church was left, but its dockside structures were abandoned at the end of the 15th century. During the medieval period, the town's three canal arms, all reached northwards into the town from the southern haven.

The Fore Bank, encircled the western side of the town, curling westwards then turning 180° to meet some of the streams at the northern end of Hedon. The Fleet, which was fed by the Burstwick Drains, went northwards through the middle of the town and had the wharfage for loading and unloading; this was mostly timber for repair and construction of buildings and is reflected in the road named Woodmarketgate, whose eastern end was on the wharfage of The Fleet. The most eastern arm, was one that went past the church of St Nicholas, and also curved westwards at the top of the town, which gave the town a moated appearance and may have led to some historians misinterpreting this as another part of the haven or port, when both Slater and Beresford contend that this was a defensive measure.

The straight edges of the Fore Bank indicate that it was dug by humans, however, some have theorised that it was purely defensive, as opposed to part of the port. Slater points out that near its southern end, there was a road called Chain Close, which could indicate the use of a chain to close off the dock. The chaining of docks occurred elsewhere (Kingston upon Hull, Portsmouth, Dartmouth and Fowey), so this was not uncommon. It is believed that improvements to The Fleet in the 15th century, led to the abandonment of the Fore Bank in favour of The Fleet.

Up until the 14th century, vessels could navigate up the River Hedon to Burstwick, but as with Hedon Haven further downstream, siltation became a problem for those trying to navigate the river. A report to the court in Hedon in 1392 stated; "...a ditch.. .whereby from time immemorial boats laden with merchandize passed from the high sea to the Humber, then to Hedon ...and ought so to pass, has become dry for lack of repair and cleaning and because it has been stopped up, so that boats cannot pass along it.."

The haven, like other waterways leading to inland ports (such as York and Patrington), was afflicted by the silting up of its riverbed. As time went on, the port at Hedon lost business to the new port at Wyke, at the mouth of the River Hull as there was a demand for larger ships which couldn't traverse the shallower channel of Hedon Haven. Wyke was later to become the Kings Town upon the Hull, latterly, Kingston-upon-Hull. By the start of the 13th century, Hedon was the eleventh busiest port in England, and despite the importance of the port to Holderness, the newer port of Hull, was sixth busiest, (Hedon paying £60 to Hull's £345 in taxes). By 1327, petitions were being made about the Sturch and Flete (both ancient names for the waterways) being silted up. Temporary sewer commissions were enacted to remedy this, and to prevent flooding, but the problems kept reoccurring. Eventually, a Court of Sewers (Note: A Court of Sewers was a body that was tasked with overseeing the flow of water and also to prevent flooding. In the East Riding, particularly around Holderness, they employed Dutch workers who had the experience of draining low-lying land. It should be remembered that in this instance, sewer is derived from its original meaning of watercourse, or a channel for fresh water, and is not about the movement of sewage.) was established for the area to help maintain the waterways. Leland, who visited the town during the reign of Henry VIII, said "...it is evident to see that some places where the ships lay be overgrown with flags and reeds and the haven is sore decayed." (Note: A translation from the original text: "Heddon hath been a fair Haven Toun: it standith a Mile or more withyn the creke that cummith out of Humbre into it. The Se crekes parting about sayde town did insulate it, and shippis lay aboute the toun, but now men cum to it by 3 bridges, wher it is evident to se that sum places, wher the shippes lay be over growen with Flagges and Reades, and the haven is very sorely dacayid.")

Siltation of the haven (and of the haven at Patrington) worsened after both Cherry Cobb Sands and Sunk Island were reclaimed by the people of Holderness and embanked. This caused the flow of the Humber Estuary to move further south, which did not clear the silt from the two havens as efficiently as it did before all the remedial works and land reclamation had taken place. Even so, as far back as the 1720s, water from near to the village of Roos was diverted to aid in the scouring of the Hedon Haven. Due to the siltation build up and diverting of the flow of the Humber, the coastal village of Paull was moved south to an alluvial sandbank created by the haven as it entered the Humber.

Charges for commodities passing through Hedon Port, 1774
| Commodity | S | D | Weight/time |
|---|---|---|---|
| Wheat, rye, beans, peas or rapeseed | 0 | 6 | Per quarter |
| Malt, oats, barley, or other grain | 0 | 4 | Per quarter |
| Meal or flour | 0 | 6 | Per sack |
| Coals, (Note: A statute written into the Hedon Haven Commissioners laws, was that the town mayor of Hedon was permitted to have three bushels of coal from every ship bringing that commodity into the haven. In 1833, this equated to about £10 worth per year.) culm, cinders | 3 | 6 | Per chaldron |
| Brick, stone, tile, lime | 3 | 6 | Per ton |
| All other goods | 4 | 0 | Howsoever weighed |

By the 1760s, both the towns of Patrington and Hedon considered that their overland transport links needed improvement, and they pursued a turnpike to Hull, which they hoped would, in turn, ramp up trade in their respective havens. (Note: The route from Hull to Hedon was a "circuitous" one that covered 9 miles (14 km) though Bilton and Preston, whereas, as the crow flies, the distance is only 6 miles (9.7 km).) In 1774, a group of townsfolk in Hedon came together to form the Hedon Haven Commissioners. They successfully passed a bill through Parliament for ..recovering, improving, and maintaining, the navigation of the Haven of Hedon in Holdernesse.. This act allowed the commissioners to levy a toll on boats passing along the haven, and also to charge for items unloaded at the town's port. The act also allowed the commissioners to build a third basin which would lead up to the turnpike road between Hedon and Patrington. The commissioners were responsible for scouring the haven to prevent silting and were responsible for the installation of lock-gates and a reservoir at the point where the navigation met the turnpike road "to allow vessels to turn around." The turning reservoir was 150 feet (46 m) long, 80 feet (24 m) wide and at least 8-foot (2.4 m) in depth.

Around this time, the main basin at the south end of town between Sheriff Bridge and Thorn Road, was widened to allow for enhanced use. After these improvements in the road and the haven, the trade at the harbour increased, mostly in corn, which was shipped to London and further inland in Yorkshire. A "water-carriage" was in operation which ran twice weekly to Leeds and Wakefield, and London "occasionally". Trade continued for some time and was deemed to be of benefit to the town until the opening of the turnpike in 1833. However, even then, the haven was still seeing regular coal and lime traffic. Silting up of the haven led to only smaller craft being able to navigate the haven and so a campaign was led by farmers in south Holderness for a railway into Hull, which could guarantee them a method of reliable delivery for their produce. The Hull to Withernsea line opened to traffic in 1854.

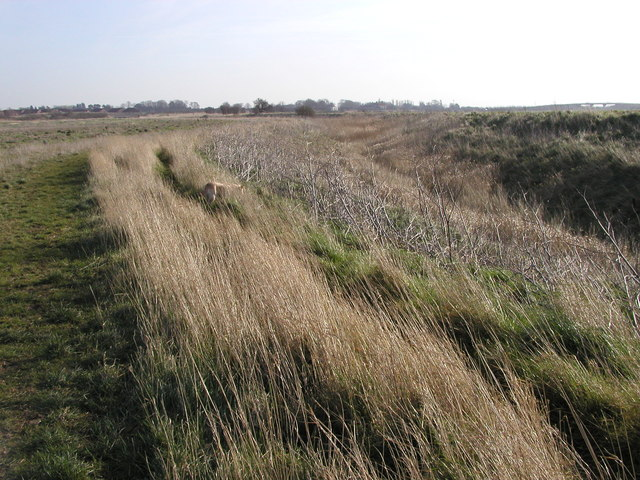
Hedon Haven - a filled in section West of Hedon

In 1951, the westernmost of the three arms of the haven which was cut directly into the town was filled in. The last barges sailed up the haven in the 1960s with closure to watercraft in October 1969, when an order varying the 1774 Act of Parliament was made which prevented navigation upstream of the gates at Pollard Clough. The final parts of the haven that were in use up until that point, were infilled with rubble in 1974. Burstwick Drain was extended to meet the old route of Hedon Haven and provide an escape for water towards the Humber. The extreme western end of Burstwick Drain is still shown on mapping as Hedon Haven. The area of the former haven within south Hedon was designated as a conservation area in 1992. The former canal arms of the navigation that stretched into the town are part of the Hedon Conservation Area, whilst where the former haven canalised arms encircled the town, are designated as a scheduled monument by Historic England.

In 1987, a new bridge costing £310,000 was installed on the Salt End to Paull Road. This replaced an older 1930s steel and timber swing bridge that had opened to allow barges up and down the haven. A swing bridge is shown at this location in the 19th century, though on a south-west/north-east axis, before the Paull Road was built on a north-west/south-east axis. The map also shows how the haven has been straightened in this location since the 19th century.

In 2008, the Hedon Haven Restoration Project was started which employed civil engineers with the task of evaluating a reformed haven. It is hoped the project will "breathe life into the area", add a further level of flood protection and become a marina for pleasure craft. The estimated cost of the project in 2005 was £17 million and an archaeological dig and survey was undertaken. Whilst the land immediately to the west of the A1033 Hedon bypass is part of a Local Development Order and is owned by Associated British Ports (ABP), the haven and the old course of the haven are not in the available land that can be built on. However, the western part of Burstwick Drain, can be utilised as part of a future industrial complex.

== Flooding and wildlife ==
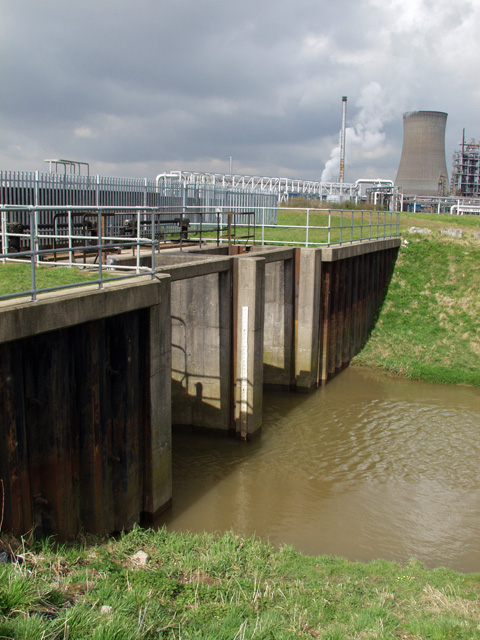
Pollard Clough, near Salt End

In 2007, Burstwick Drain, which outfalls into the Humber as Hedon Haven, swamped its banks, flooding the village of Burstwick and the town of Hedon. The riverflow at Pollard Clough was measured at a height of 8 feet 9 inches (2.67 m), which is the highest level on record. This had several causal factors; heavy rain, the siltation of the riverbed and the sluice gates at the western end which held back the water. The Pollard Clough sluice gates, located 0.93 miles (1.5 km) upstream of the Humber, are there to prevent tidal water passing up the Hedon Haven/Burstwick Drain and flooding the valley. Previously, the floodgates were located further upstream at Hedon Haven Clough. As the gates are operated with the rising tides, severe weather can mean that the Burstwick Drain is tide-locked for some time, thereby risking flooding in Hedon and other areas as many watercourses drain into the haven by gravity. Additionally, when the gates are locked against the tide, and the drain itself is flooded due to rainfall, the gates prevent water exiting the drain, which causes backflow and flooding upstream.

The depth of Burstwick Drain is stated to be 8 feet 6 inches (2.6 m) from bed to the top of the bank; at the time of the floods, it was estimated that bottom 4 feet 7 inches (1.4 m) of that was silt.

The Burstwick Drain extends for just over 5.6 miles (9 km) and drains an area of 10 square miles (26 km^{2}). Due to the agricultural nature of the land that it drains, the surface run-off from fields has contributed to the river's poor ecological status. The underlying geology of the region that the watercourse drains is glacial gravels, marshes and estuarine alluvium.

The extreme western end of the haven has been the subject of many studies and is part of a local development order. Associated British Ports have earmarked the land for a port extension. Development of the land from agricultural open land into industrial, has prompted many surveys which have recorded that whilst the haven is a suitable habitat for water voles and otters, there is no record of them being on the watercourse. Marine mammals are prevented from accessing the haven due to the tidal barrier at Pollard Clough.

Previous to the installation of the Pollard Clough sluice, the haven was tidal as far as Hedon. Despite the influx of freshwater from the surrounding drains, crab and plaice were able to be netted along the haven and as far as Hedon itself.

== See also ==
- Holderness Drain
- List of rivers of Yorkshire
