= List of rivers of Yorkshire =

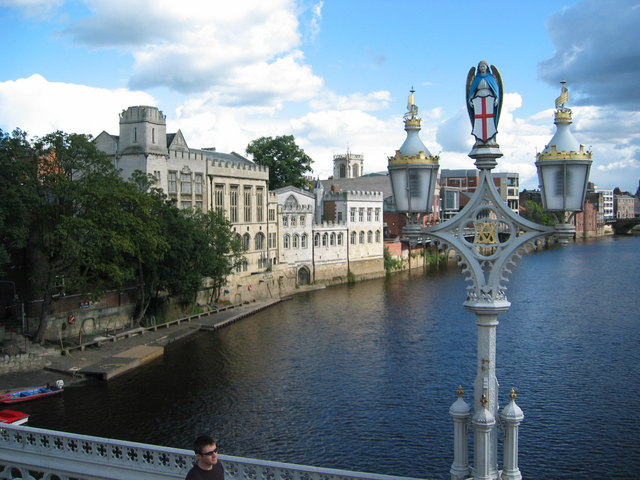
View of the River Ouse in York from Lendal Bridge

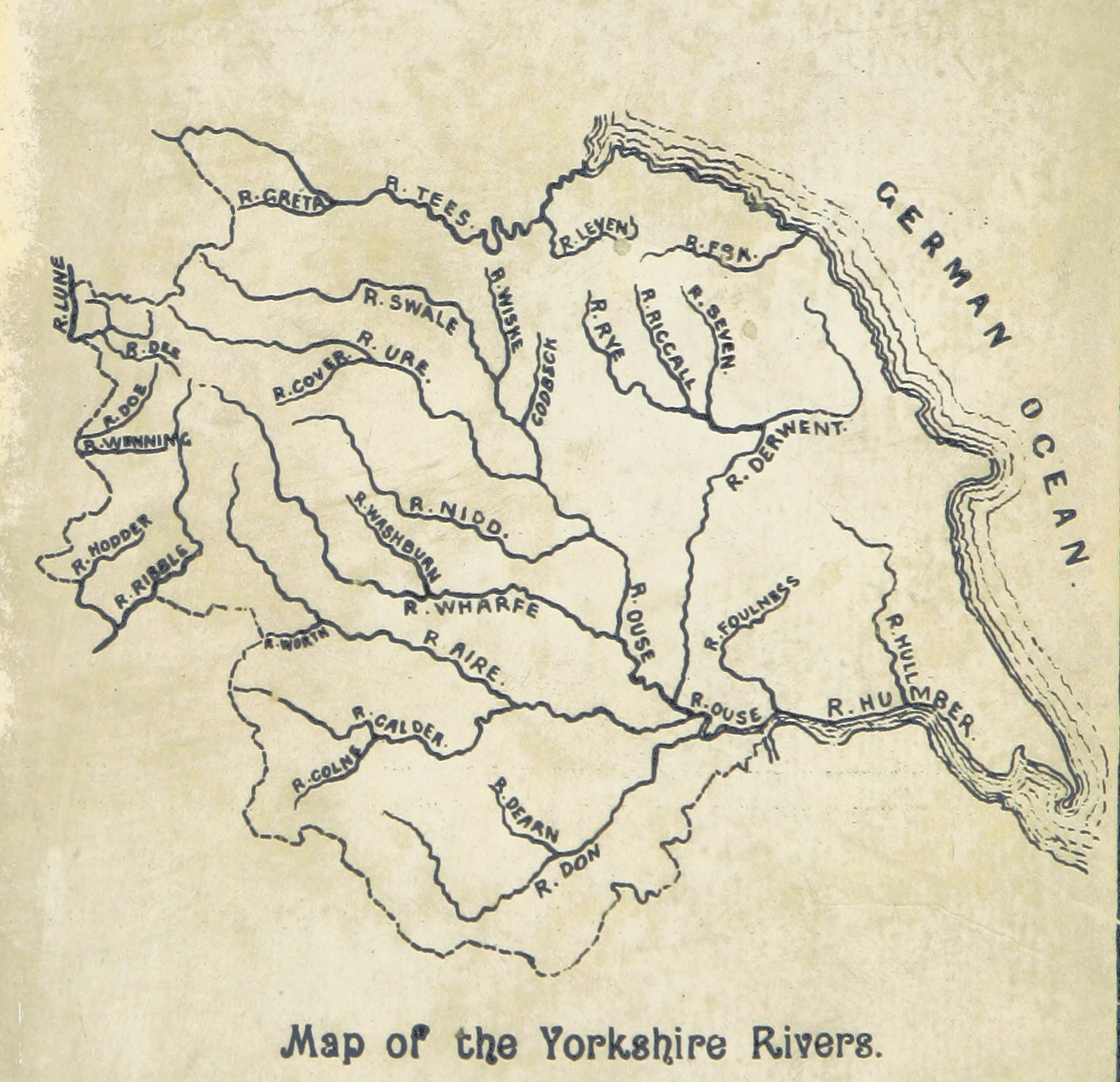
Simplified map of Yorkshire's rivers

This is a list of named rivers that flow either wholly or partially within the boundaries of the four ceremonial counties that form Yorkshire. There are twenty five rivers of at least 20 kilometres (12 miles) in total. The majority of these waterways lie wholly within the county boundaries, except for; the Ribble, which flows into the Irish Sea at Lytham; the Rother, whose source is located in Derbyshire Peak District; the Greta, which flows into Lancashire to join the River Lune; and the Tees, which flows partly within County Durham and forms some of the boundary with North Yorkshire.

The direction of stream flow in Yorkshire is influenced by the three major drainage divides. The Pennines in the west and south, the North York Moors in the north-east and the Yorkshire Wolds, the coastal range of hills on the east. This represents a large drainage area that mostly flows into the Vale of York and into the North Sea via the Humber estuary. Though an estuary, the Humber is often referred to as a river.

The Humber river system is tidal as far inland as Naburn Lock on the River Ouse, Knottingley on the River Aire and Askern on the River Don. The Humber has the second largest tidal range in the UK at 7.2 metres (24 ft). The largest is the Bristol Channel at nearly double that range.

Source data for the table below came from the National Environment Research Council Centre for Ecology and Hydrology, Ordnance Survey, Environment Agency and Google Earth. In the table, total lengths are given in miles (mi) and kilometres (km), and elevations are in feet (ft) and metres (m). River lengths are taken from actual source when wholly within the Yorkshire County boundary, else measured from where the river enters or leaves the county.

== Images ==
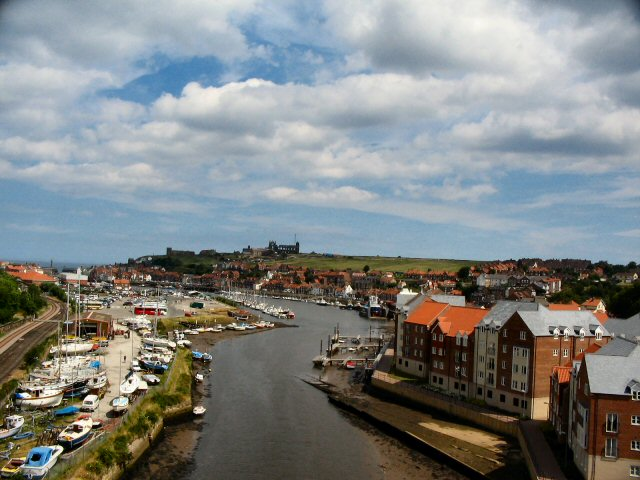
The River Esk at Whitby

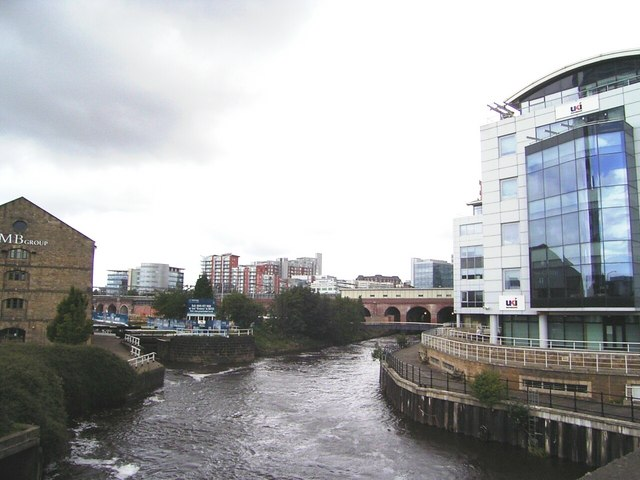
The River Aire and the Leeds-Liverpool canal in Leeds

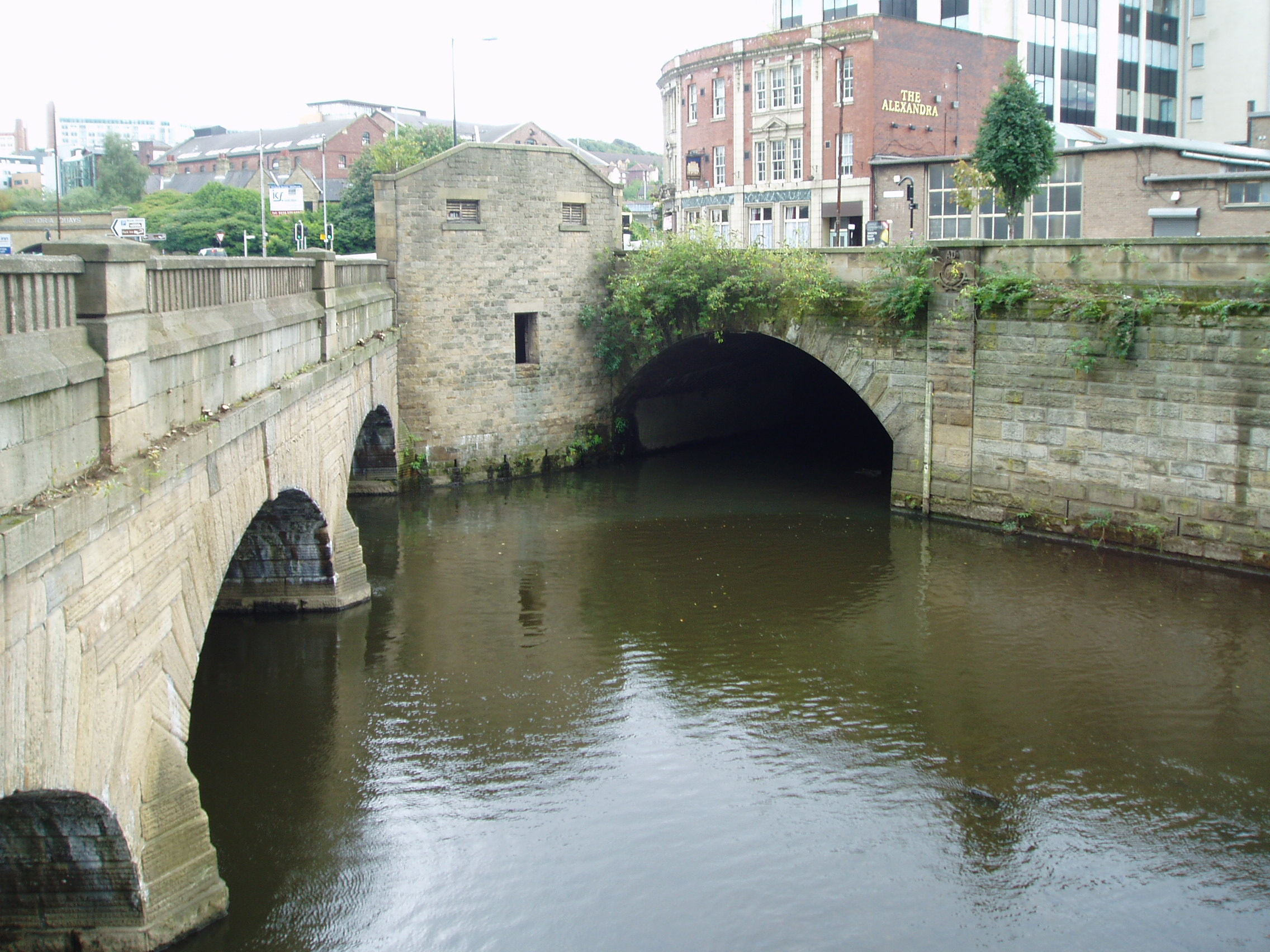
River Sheaf joins River Don at Sheffield

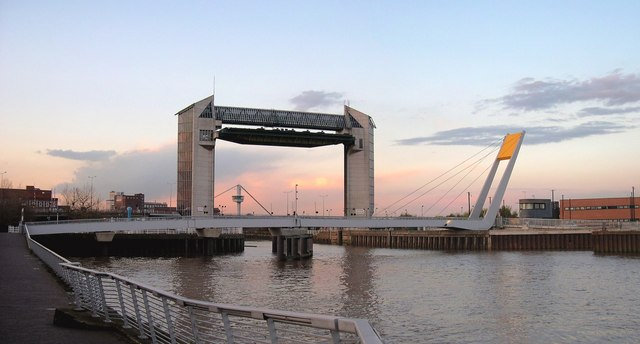
Tidal Barrier on the River Hull at Kingston upon Hull

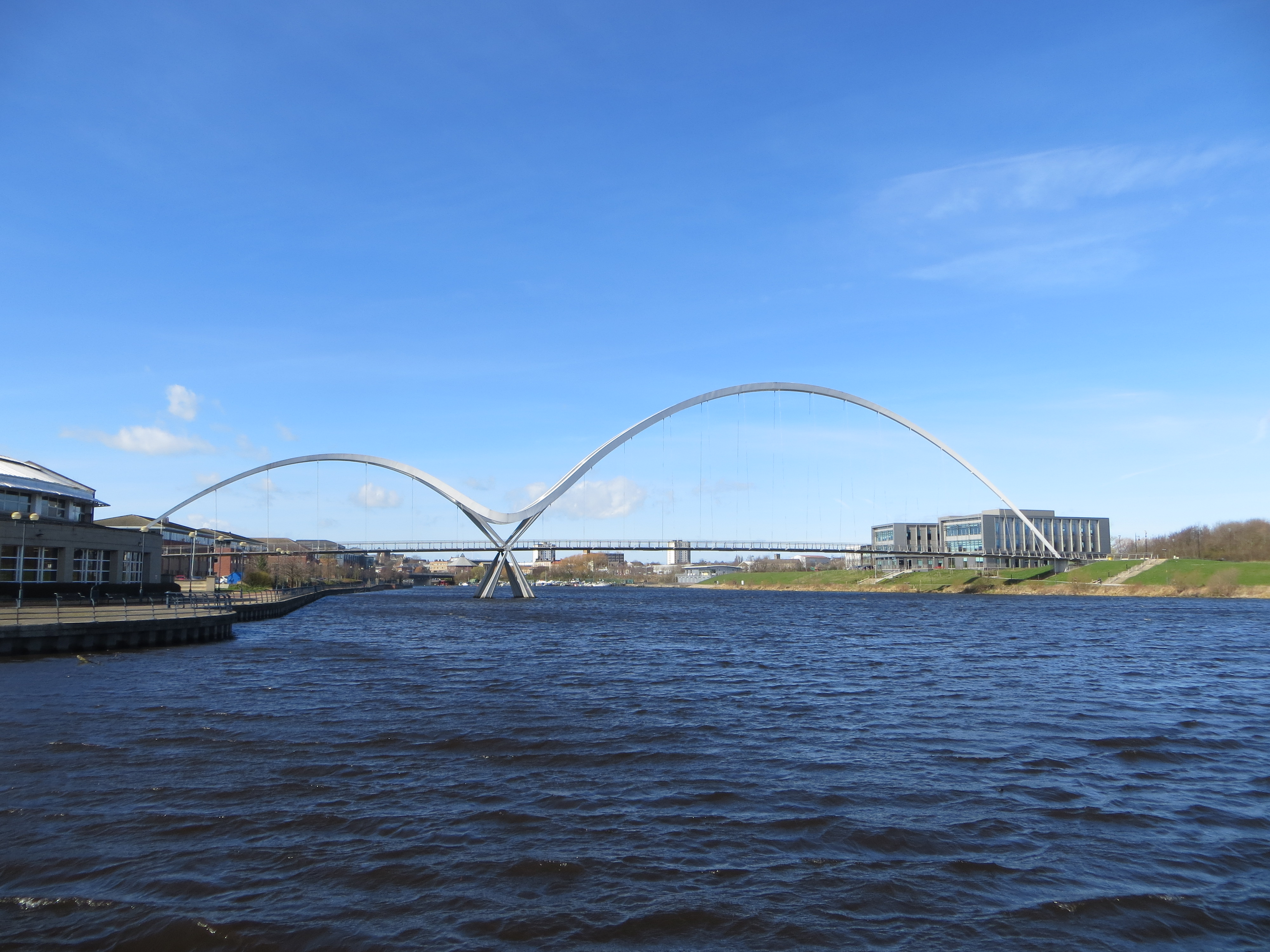
Infinity Bridge on River Tees in the Borough of Stockton-on-Tees

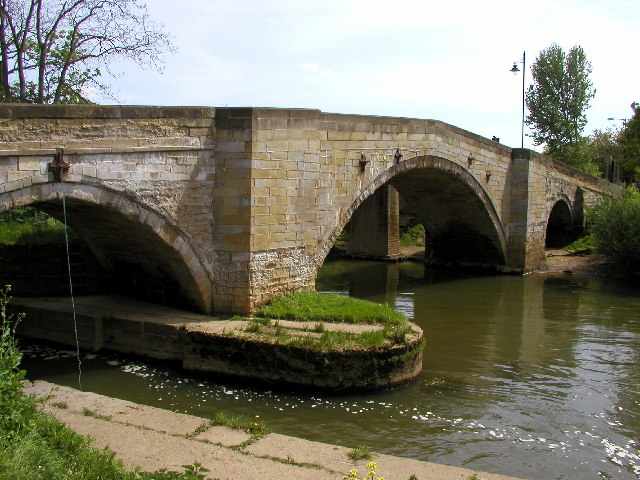
The road bridge at Stamford Bridge over the River Derwent

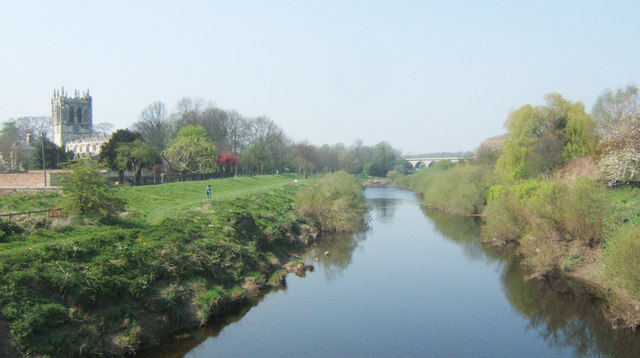
River Wharfe at Tadcaster

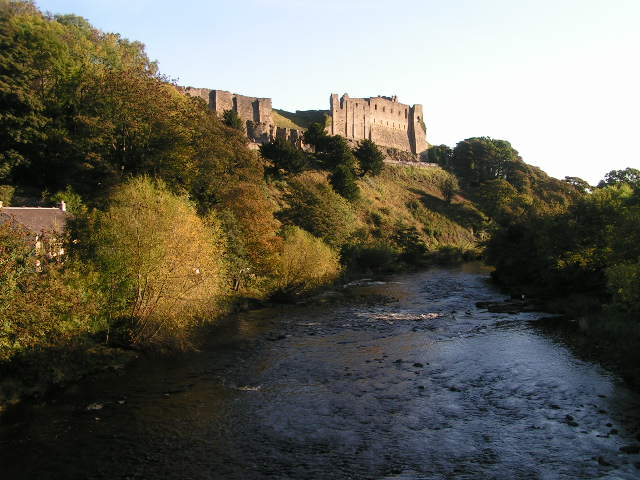
Richmond Castle and the River Swale

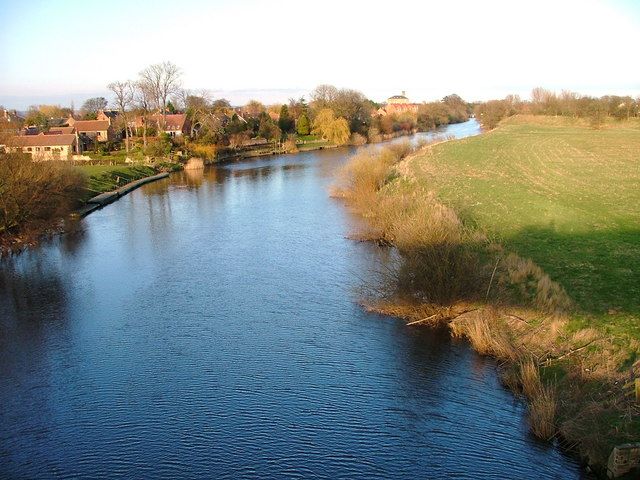
River Ure at Boroughbridge

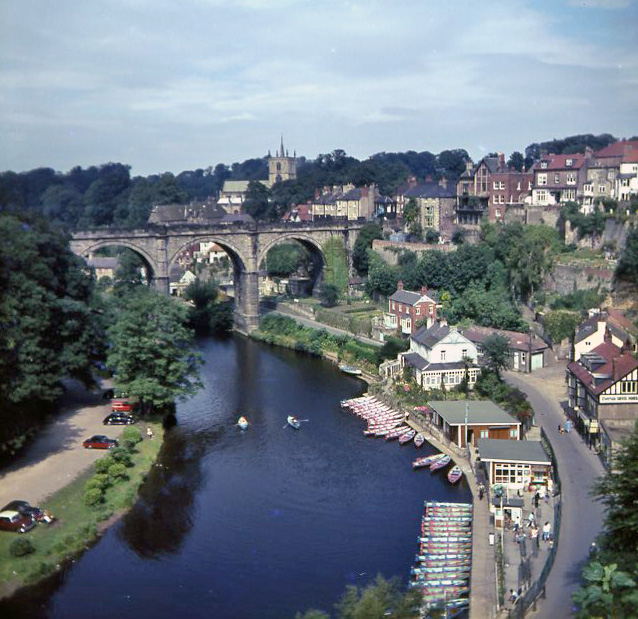
River Nidd and railway viaduct at Knaresborough
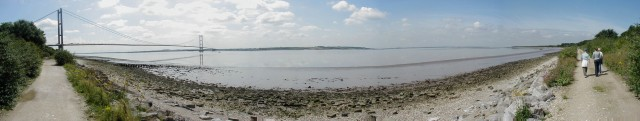
Panorama of the Humber including the Humber Bridge.

== List ==
The use of the term source in this list is taken to mean the point at which the name of the river is first used on Ordnance Survey maps.

Key
† River length within county only

Name	Total length	Mouth	Mouth coordinates	Mouth elevation	Source	Source coordinates	Source elevation	Catchment Area
Aire	114 km 71 miles	River Ouse, Yorkshire near Airmyn	53°43′35″N 0°54′22″W	3 m 9.8 ft	Malham Tarn	54°5′45″N 2°10′0″W	377 m 1,237 ft	856 km² 331 sq miles
Arkle Beck	17 km approx	River Swale at Reeth	NY 987 030	177 m	Arkengarthdale Moor	NY 989 088	477 m	
Ashfold Side Beck	9 km Approx	River Nidd near Pateley Bridge	SE 152 664	117 m	Ashfold Gill Head	SE 073 685	504 m	
Bain	3.95 km 2.45 miles	River Ure near Bainbridge	54°18′45″N 2°6′3″W	210 m 690 ft	Semer Water	54°17′3″N 2°7′22″W	252 m 827 ft	Not available
Barney Beck	6 km approx	River Swale at Healaugh	SE 015 984	186 m	Reeth High Moor	NY 963 012	451m	Not available
Birkdale Beck	6 km approx	River Swale near Keld	NY 872 013	341 m	Beck Meetings	NY 820 035	455 m	Not available
Bishopdale Beck	11 km approx	River Ure near Aysgarth	SE 019 879	144 m	Dale Head	SD 961 826	218 m	Not available
River Burn	13 km approx	River Ure at Masham	SE 230 797	70 m	Masham Moor	SE 113 799	292 m	
Calder	71 km 44 miles	River Aire	53°43′54″N 1°21′33″W	14 m 46 ft	Heald Moor, near Todmorden	53°44′23″N 2°9′53″W	220 m 720 ft	930 km² 360 sq miles
Colne	20.6 km 12.8 miles	River Calder near Bradley	53°40′49″N 1°43′52″W	52 m 171 ft	Confluence of Redbrook Clough and Haigh Clough	53°36′19″N 1°57′28″W	234 m 768 ft	245 km² 95 sq miles
Cover	22 km 14 miles	River Ure near Middleham	54°16′43″N 1°46′25″W	98 m 322 ft	Great Hunters Sleets near Woodale	54°11′2″N 2°1′29″W	487 m 1,598 ft	Not available
Crimple	25 km	River Nidd near Wetherby	SE 405 531	21 m	Crimple Head Farm	SE 247 519	221 m	
Dearne	51.9 km 32.2 miles	River Don near Conisbrough	53°29′39″N 1°14′34″W	17 m 56 ft	Birdsedge near Denby Dale	53°33′52″N 1°42′37″W	319 m 1,047 ft	310.8 km² 120 sq miles
Derwent	115.1 km 71.5 miles	River Ouse at Barmby on the Marsh	53°44′58″N 0°58′8″W	10 m 33 ft	Derwent Head near RAF Fylingdales	54°22′50″N 0°37′24″W	260 m 850 ft	1,634 km² 631 sq miles
Dibb	5.2 km 3.2 miles	River Wharfe near Appletreewick	54°2′27″N 1°56′35″W	143 m 469 ft	Grimwith Reservoir	54°4′48″N 1°54′41″W	253 m 830 ft	25.5 km² 9.8 sq miles
Doe	5.92 km 3.68 miles	Confluence with River Twiss at Ingleton	54°9′12″N 2°28′15″W	118 m 387 ft	God's Bridge near Chapel-Le-Dale	54°10′58″N 2°24′40″W	234 m 768 ft	Not available
Don	114.1 km 70.9 miles	River Ouse at Goole	53°41′47″N 0°51′59″W	3 m 9.8 ft	Confluence of Great Grains Clough and Black Grough near Winscar Reservoir, Dunford Bridge	53°31′14″N 1°48′16″W	416 m 1,365 ft	1,256.2 km² 485 sq miles
Dove, Nth Yorks	30.22 km 18.78 miiles	River Rye near Salton	54°12′6″N 0°54′35″W	24 m 79 ft	Farndale Moor, Nth Yorkshire	54°24′24″N 1°2′23″W	372 m 1,220 ft	59.2 km² 22.9 sq miles
Dove, Sth Yorks	7.91 km 4.92 miles	River Dearne near Darfield, South Yorkshire	53°31′43″N 1°22′9″W	22 m 72 ft	Worsbrough Reservoir	53°31′34″N 1°28′27″W	56 m 184 ft	Not available
Earby Beck		River Aire near Skipton	SD 961 514	m	Foulridge	SD 889 427	m	Not available
Eastburn Beck		Kellythorpe	TA 023 564	14 m	Kirkburn	SE 984 552	22 m	Not available
Eller Beck		Beck Hole	NZ 820 021	59 m	Allerston High Moor	SE 871 958	253 m	Not available
Eshton Beck		Gargrave	SD943539	102 m	Winterburn	SD 933 585	149 m	Not available
Esk	45 km 28 miles	North Sea at Whitby	54°29′33″N 0°36′44″W	0 m 0 ft	The Esklets near Westerdale	54°24′3″N 0°59′8″W	251 m 823 ft	308 km² 119 sq miles
Ewden Beck		River Don at Wharncliffe Side	SK 298 954	106 m	Margery Hill	SK 188 958	541 m	Not available
Foss	31 km 19 miles	River Ouse, York	53°57′5″N 1°4′42″W	12 m 39 ft	Near Oulston Reservoir, Yearsley	54°9′38″N 1°7′54″W	160 m 520 ft	118 km² 46 sq miles
Foulness	25.51 km 15.85 mi	Market Weighton Canal	53°46′56″N 0°42′57″W	1 m 3 ft	Shiptonthorpe	53°53′8″N 0°42′39″W	20 m 66 ft	N/A
Greta	7.55 km 4.69 miles†	Leaves Yorkshire near Burton-in-Lonsdale	54°8′35″N 2°33′30″W	64 m 210 ft	Confluence of River Doe and River Twiss at Ingleton	54°9′12″N 2°28′15″W	118 m 387 ft	86.1 km² 33.2 sq miles
Hedon Haven/Burstwick Drain	12 kilometres (7.5 mi)	Paull	53.7275°N 0.2363°W	0 metres (0 ft)	Elstronwick	53.7596°N 0.1310°W	5 metres (16 ft)	26 square kilometres (10 sq mi)
Hertford	16 km approx	River Derwent at Binnington Carr	SE 970 789	23 m	Hunmanby	TA 110 771	49 m	
Holme	13.86 km 8.61 miles	River Colne at Huddersfield	53°38′20″N 1°47′4″W	72 m 236 ft	Holmbridge	53°13′15″N 1°49′27″W	188 m 617 ft	97.4 km² 37.6 sq miles
How Stean Beck	6 km Approx	River Nidd at Lofthouse	SE 102730	157 m		SE 055 728	338 m	
Hull	46.84 km 29.11 miles	Humber estuary at Kingston upon Hull	53°44′17″N 0°19′55″W	0 m 0 ft	Confluence of Driffield Trout Stream and Little Driffield Beck	53°59′39″N 0°26′25″W	17 m 56 ft	378.1 km² 146 sq miles
Humber	61.9 km 38.5 miles	North Sea at Spurn Head	53°32′33″N 0°6′23″E	0 m 0 ft	Trent Falls	53°42′8″N 0°41′46″W	0 m 0 ft	Not available without Trent Basin
Kyle	9.31 km 5.78 miles	River Ouse near Newton-on-Ouse	54°2′5″N 1°13′28″W	11 m 36 ft	Confluence of Derrings Beck and Carle Beck near Tholthorpe	54°5′24″N 1°15′38″W	12 m 39 ft	Not available
Laver	15 km 9.3 miles	River Skell near Ripon	54°7′55″N 1°32′8″W	33 m 108 ft	Confluence of North Gill Beck and South Gill Beck at Dallowgill	54°8′22″N 1°42′30″W	170 m 560 ft	Not available
Leven	46.2 km 28.7 miles	River Tees near Yarm	54°30′31″N 1°20′12″W	16 m 52 ft	Kildale Moor, Nth Yorks	54°27′50″N 1°2′47″W	279 m 915 ft	196.3 km² 75.8 sq miles
Little Don River	14 km approx	River Don near Stocksbridge	SK 290 979	132 m	Harden Moor	SK 169 993	348 m	
Loxley	16 km 9.9 miles	River Don, South Yorkshire at Owlerton	53.400526°N 1.486888°W	58 m 190 ft	Damflask Reservoir near Stacey Bank	53°24′38″N 1°34′16″W	133 m 436 ft	43.5 km² 27 sq miles
Nidd	95.45 km 59.31 miles	River Ouse, Yorkshire at Nun Monkton	54°0′51″N 1°13′8″W	13 m 43 ft	Nidd Heads on Great Whernside	54°10′20″N 2°0′11″W	660 m 2,170 ft	516 km² 199 sq miles
Ouse	84 km 52 miles	Trent Falls	53°42′8″N 0°41′46″W	0 m 0 ft	River Ure at Cuddy Shaw Reach	54°2′4″N 1°16′30″W	12 m 39 ft	3,315 km² 1,280 sq miles
Ribble	38.48 km 23.91 miles†	County Border near Swinden	53°58′16″N 2°13′55″W	117 m 384 ft	Ribble Head	54°12′42″N 2°21′43″W	290 m 950 ft	204 km² 79 sq miles
Riccall	18.36 km 11.41 miles	River Rye	54°12′14″N 0°54′58″W	24 m 79 ft	Confluence of Bonfield Gill and Bogmire Gill near Helmsley	54°17′52″N 1°3′40″W	130 m 430 ft	57.6 km² 22.2 sq miles
Rivelin	6.81 km 4.23 miles	River Loxley	53°23′59″N 1°30′41″W	77 m 253 ft	Rivelin Dams near Sheffield	53°22′43″N 1°35′11″W	206 m 676 ft	Not available
Rother	16.77 km 10.42 miles†	River Don at Rotherham	53°21′31″N 1°21′43″W	26 m 85 ft	County Boundary at Eckington	53°18′56″N 1°20′25″W	47 m 154 ft	352.2 km² 136 sq miles
Ryburn	11.4 km 7.1 miles	River Calder at Sowerby Bridge	53°42′28″N 1°54′42″W	80 m 260 ft	Confluence of unnamed stream and Black Castle Clough near Rishworth	53°39′35″N 2°1′29″W	361 m 1,184 ft	13 sq miles
Rye	61.5 km 38.2 miles	River Derwent near Malton	54°10′15″N 0°44′25″W	19 m 62 ft	Rye Head near Osmotherley	54°22′23″N 1°14′12″W	302 m 991 ft	679 km² 262 sq miles
Ryton	3.4 km 2.1 miles†	County Border with Nottinghamshire	53°19′22″N 1°10′19″W	48 m 157 ft	Confluence of Anston Brook and Pudding Dike	53°20′5″N 1°11′26″W	71 m 233 ft	77 km² 30 sq miles
Seven	34.9 km 21.7 miles	River Rye	54°11′13″N 0°51′51″W	22 m 72 ft	Danby High Moor near Rosedale Abbey	54°24′2″N 0°57′7″W	330 m 1,080 ft	121.6 km² 47 sq miles
Sheaf	9.6 km 6 miles	River Don	53°23′7″N 1°27′44″W	53 m 174 ft	Confluence of Oldhay Brook and Totley Brook	53°19′12″N 1°31′24″W	143 m 469 ft	49.1 km² 19 sq miles
Skell	19 km 12 miles	River Ure near Ripon	54°8′0″N 1°30′3″W	23 m 75 ft	Howson Ridge near Wath-in-Nidderdale	54°7′2″N 1°44′59″W	350 m 1150 ft	Not available
Skirfare	15.24 km 9.47 miles	River Wharfe	54°7′8″N 2°2′8″W	197 m 646 ft	Confluence of Foxup Beck and Cosh Beck	54°11′12″N 2°11′49″W	313 m 1,027 ft	Not available
Spen	8 km 5 miles	River Calder at Dewsbury	53°40′49″N 1°39′4″W	42 m 138 ft	Confluence of Hunsworth Beck and Nann Hall Beck in Cleckheaton	53°43′48.2″N 1°42′45.6″W	81 m 266 ft	46.3 km² 17.9 sq miles
Swale	117.8 km 73.2 miles	River Ure	54°5′16.27″N 1°20′36.27″W	11 m 36.09 ft	Confluence of Birkdale Beck and Great Sleddale Beck	54°24′10.87″N 2°13′21.65″W	366 m 1,200 ft	1,363 km² 526 sq miles
Tees	88.4 km 54.9 miles†	North Sea at Redcar	54°38′51″N 1°8′57″W	0 m 0 ft	Enters Yorkshire at Gainford	54°32′33″N 1°43′19″W	67 m 220 ft	1,264 km² 488 sq miles
Tutt	12 km approx	River Ure at Boroughbridge	SE 396 669	11 m	Nidd	SE 324 592	61 m	
Twiss	4.17 km 2.59 miles	Confluence with River Doe at Ingleton	54°9′11″N 2°28′15″W	118 m 387 ft	Keld Head	54°11′3″N 2°28′4″W	264 km 866 ft	Not available
Ure	118 km 73 miles	Cuddy Shaw Reach where renamed to River Ouse	54°2′4″N 1°16′30″W	12 m 39 ft	Ure Head near Abbotside	54°21′56″N 2°18′4″W	635 m 2,083 ft	914.6 km² 353.1 sq miles
Washburn	26 km 16 miles	River Wharfe near Pool	53°54′39″N 1°39′8″W	49 m 161 ft	Washburn Head	54°3′46″N 1°50′50″W	391 m 1,283 ft	87.3 km² 54.2 sq miles
Wenning	13 km approx†	Yorkshire/Lancashire boundary at Bentham	SD 623 698	54 m	Clapham	SD 744 673	124 m	
Wharfe	97 km 60 miles	River Ouse at Wharfe's Mouth, near Cawood	53°50′38.76″N 1°7′46.36″W	4.9 m 16 ft	Beckermonds, Langstrothdale Chase	54°13′2.93″N 2°11′39.23″W	310 m 1,020 ft	818 km² 316 sq miles
Went	26.7 km 16.6 miles	River Don near Snaith	53°38′40″N 0°59′27″W	5 m 16 ft	Confluence of Went Beck and Hessle Beck at Low Ackworth	53°38′54″N 1°20′23″W	32 m 105 ft	87.3 km² 33.7 sq miles
Wiske	46.9 km 29.1 miles	River Swale near Kirby Wiske	54°14′38″N 1°26′19″W	21 m 69 ft	Confluence of Stony Lane Beck and Carr Beck near Ingleby Arncliffe	54°23′10″N 1°19′25″W	69 m 226 ft	215.5 km² 83.2 sq miles
Worth	15.2 km 9.4 miles	River Aire near Keighley	53°52′31″N 1°53′7″W	88 m 289 ft	Watersheddles Reservoir	53°50′17″N 2°2′49″W	329 m 1,079 ft	71.7 km² 27.7 sq miles

== Map ==
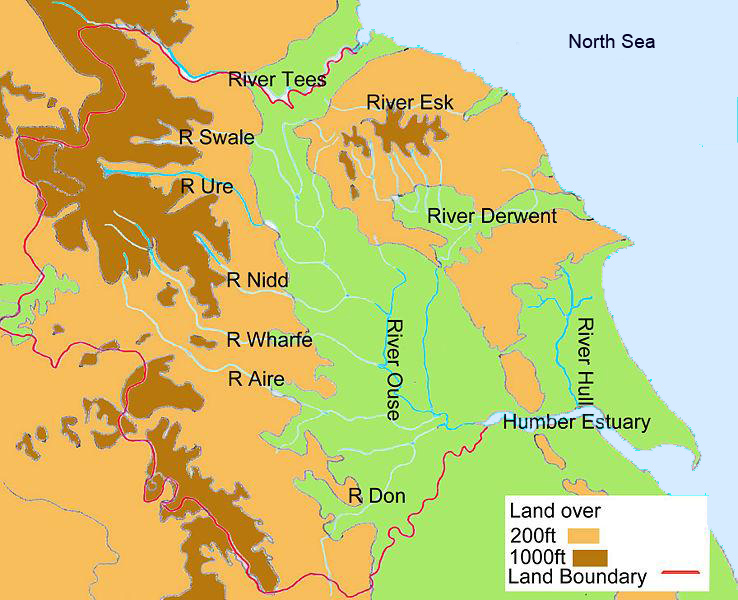
Main Rivers of Yorkshire. Each label is wikilinked to an article.

== Sources ==
- Ordnance Survey Open Viewer https://www.ordnancesurvey.co.uk/business-government/tools-support/open-data-support
- Google Earth
- National Environment Research Council - Centre for Ecology and Hydrology
- Environment Agency
- Map of main rivers
