= Listed buildings in Sunk Island =

Sunk Island is a civil parish in the county of the East Riding of Yorkshire, England. It contains 21 listed buildings that are recorded in the National Heritage List for England. All the listed buildings are designated at Grade II, the lowest of the three grades, which is applied to "buildings of national importance and special interest". The parish consists of reclaimed land administered by The Crown, and it contains no significant settlements. Most of the listed buildings are farmhouses, farm buildings and associated cottages, and the others include a church, a former vicarage, a school and a former school house, a war memorial and a telephone kiosk.

== Buildings ==
Name and location	Photograph	Date	Notes
South Farmhouse; 53.63865°N 0.10180°W		Early 19th century	The farmhouse was altered by S. S. Teulon in 1856. It is in red-brown brick, with a sill band, a stepped and dentilled brick eaves cornice, and a hipped Welsh slate roof. There are two storeys, a double depth plan and a front of three bays. On the centre is a projecting full-height enclosed porch, and a doorway with a fanlight and a painted rubbed brick round arch with an impost band, above which is a recessed panel with motifs in relief and a date. The porch is flanked by bay windows, and the windows are sashes with cambered wedge lintels and keystones.
4–5 Bleak House Farm Cottages; 53.66319°N 0.03655°W		1855	A pair of cottages designed by S. S. Teulon, in red brick with a hipped slate roof and two storeys. The windows are sashes, on the ground floor with pointed heads, and above with segmental heads, and there is a small painted plaque in a pointed recess. The corners of the ground floor are chamfered and contain small windows with pointed heads.
East Bank Farmhouse; 53.64038°N 0.04580°W		1855	The farmhouse, designed by S. S. Teulon, is in banded brown and orange brick, partly rendered, with stone dressings, stepped eaves, and a tile roof with tumbled-in brick to the gables. There are two storeys, and a south front of three bays, with a canted bay window on the left, and a projecting gabled wing on the right. The recessed doorway has a segmental-pointed doorway with a double chamfered surround, and the windows are mullioned and transomed. On the west front is a full-height gabled porch with a diagonal buttress, and above the doorway is a panel with motifs in relief and the date. To the left is a single storey three-bay outhouse with a verandah.
Middle Farmhouse; 53.64913°N 0.07051°W	—	1855	The farmhouse, designed by S. S. Teulon, is in red brick, on a chamfered plinth, with stepped eaves, and a double-span Welsh slate roof with tumbled-in brick to the gables. There are two storeys, almost a T-shaped plan, an east front of four bays, and a rear wing. The doorway has a segmental head and a chamfered surround, above which is a panel with motifs and the date in relief. To the right is a canted bay window, and most of the other windows are sashes.
Weighbridge House; 53.65204°N 0.13022°W		c. 1855	The building is in red brick with a hipped slate roof. There is a single storey and a single bay. On the northeast front is a doorway with a segmental head. The northwest front has a segmental-headed window with iron Gothic glazing.
White House Farmhouse; 53.64567°N 0.08494°W		1855	The farmhouse, designed by S. S. Teulon, is in red-brown brick, on a chamfered plinth, with stepped eaves, and tumbled-in brick to the gables. There are two storeys, and a double-depth nearly L-shaped plan, with a south front of three bays. The doorway has a segmental head and a rubbed brick arch, to the left is a bay window, and most of the other windows are sashes with segmental rubbed brick arches. The panel containing motifs in relief and the date is in a corbeled-out part of a chimneystack.
Church Farmhouse; 53.65493°N 0.08473°W		1856	The farmhouse, designed by S. S. Teulon, is in red brick, on a chamfered plinth, with stepped eaves and a tile roof with tumbled-in brick to the gables. There are two storeys and a nearly T-shaped plan, the west front with three bays, the left bay projecting and gabled, and a double-depth rear wing. The doorway has a segmental head and a chamfered surround, a window to the right and a circular date plaque above, all under a segmental-pointed relieving arch. The windows are sashes, the upper floor of the west front containing two half-dormers.
East range of farm buildings, Church Farm; 53.65527°N 0.08432°W	—	1856	This is a range of cowsheds designed by S. S. Teulon. It is in bands of orange-brown and red brick, with stepped eaves, and a pantile roof with tumbled-in brick to the gables. There is one storey, a rectangular plan, and 14 bays. On the front are six round-arched openings in the centre, flanked by four narrower round-arched openings. To the right is a segmental-headed window, and to the left are a pair of segmental-headed doors and a window. Some openings have doors, and others are blocked.
North range of farm buildings, Church Farm; 53.65541°N 0.08467°W		1856	The range contains a barn, a cart shed, and a granary designed by S. S. Teulon. It is in bands of orange-brown and red brick, with yellow brick dressings, stepped eaves, and a half-hipped asbestos roof with tumbled-in brick to the gables. There are two storeys and a rectangular plan. In the centre is a brick staircase to the granary, and the openings include doorways, a wagon entrance, windows, hatches and slit vents, and there is an arcade of four segmental arches.
West range of farm buildings, Church Farm; 53.65522°N 0.08477°W		1856	The range was designed by S. S. Teulon, and is in bands of orange-brown and red brick, with stepped eaves, and a pantile roof with tumbled-in brick to the gables. There is a rectangular plan, and it consists of a two-storey two-bay stable and granary, flanked by single storey four-bay stables. The west front contains three two-light casement windows on the ground floor, two board doors above, and pipe vents, and the east front and returns have doors and windows under segmental heads.
Ivy House Farmhouse; 53.66913°N 0.05918°W	—	1856	The farmhouse, designed by S. S. Teulon, is in red-brown brick, on a chamfered plinth, with stepped eaves, and a pantile roof. There are two storeys and a south front of three bays. On the front is a full-height gabled porch and a round-arched entrance with a keystone, above which is a recessed panel containing motifs and the date in relief. The windows are sashes in architraves, on the ground floor with segmental arches and keystones, and on the upper floor under cambered arches.
Winestead Farmhouse; 53.66628°N 0.06749°W	—	1856	The farmhouse, designed by S. S. Teulon, is in red-brown brick, with dressings in orange and black brick, on a chamfered plinth, with stepped eaves, and a Welsh slate roof with tumbled-in brick to the gables. There are two storeys and an irregular plan, with a west front of three bays. On the left is a full-height gabled porch containing a polygonal panel with motifs in relief and the date. Most of the windows are sashes.
Channel Farmhouse; 53.65281°N 0.04453°W		1857	The farmhouse, designed by S. S. Teulon, is in red brick, on a chamfered plinth, with orange-red brick dressings, stepped eaves, and a tile roof with tumbled-in brick to the gables, and half-hipped on the right. There are two storeys and a nearly L-shaped plan, consisting of a double-depth main range with four bays, and a projecting two-bay gabled wing on the left. On the west front is a porch with buttresses, a segmental-pointed chamfered entrance, and a doorway with a fanlight, above which is a painted relief panel. The windows are sashes under segmental rubbed brick pointed arches, and on the wing is a canted bay window.
Corner House; 53.66018°N 0.08683°W	—	c. 1857	A pair of cottages designed by S. S. Teulon, later converted into a house. It is in red brick with hipped slate roofs. There are two storeys and four bays. The doorways have pointed arches, and the windows are sashes, some with pointed heads and others with segmental heads.
Old School House; 53.65195°N 0.08471°W		1857	The school house, later a private house, was designed by S. S. Teulon. It is in colourwashed red brick on a chamfered plinth, with stepped eaves, and a banded slate roof with tumbled-in brick to the gables. There is one storey and attics, and an east front of two bays. The doorway has a chamfered surround and a trefoil head, and is flanked by lancet windows. Above it is a gabled half-dormer with a hipped roof, containing an oriel window on corbelled brackets. Elsewhere, there are sash windows.
South Farm Cottages; 53.64631°N 0.09498°W	—	1857	A pair of cottages designed by S. S. Teulon in red brick with a hipped slate roof. There are two storeys and four bays. The windows are sashes. On the ground floor they have pointed arches, and the middle two are horizontally sliding. The two central upper floor windows have segmental heads, and the outer ones are lower with pointed heads.
The Old School; 53.65201°N 0.08451°W		1857	The school, designed by S. S. Teulon, is in red brick, partly colourwashed, on a chamfered plinth, with overhanging eaves, and a banded slate roof, hipped on the right. There is a single storey, and a south front of six bays. It contains windows of varying types, and a recessed panel with motifs in relief and the date. On the roof is a diagonally-set square bell turret with a splayed base, buttresses flanking segmental-arched openings, a stone string course, and a polygonal brick spire with a weathervane.
Holy Trinity Church; 53.65210°N 0.08372°W		1876–77	The church, designed by Ewan Christian, is in red brick, with sandstone bands to the nave, limestone dressings, and a Westmorland slate roof. It consists of a nave, a chancel with an apse and a north vestry, and a south tower linked by a passage to the nave. The tower has two stages, and contains a pointed south doorway with a chamfered surround and a hood mould, lancet windows, a moulded string course, two-light bell openings with pierced roundels above twin lancets, a continuous pointed hood mould, a stepped and cogged brick cornice, and a short pyramidal spire with a ball finial and a weathercock. On the east is a stair turret with slit lights, a dentilled cornice and a half-conical roof with a fleur-de-lys finial.
The Old Vicarage; 53.65213°N 0.08244°W		1876–77	The vicarage, later a private house, was designed by Ewan Christian. It is in red brick on a chamfered plinth, with a stepped and dentilled brick eaves cornice, and a hipped Welsh slate roof. There are two storeys and three bays, the middle bay projecting under a broken pediment. The entrance is on the left return, and the windows are sashes with moulded sills.
War memorial 53.65194°N 0.08424°W		1920	The war memorial is in York stone, and is about 3 metres (9.8 ft) in height. It consists of a cross with a square shaft, on a square base, on a two-stepped podium, on a square concrete raft. Attached are panels in grey granite with inscriptions, the panel on the front of the base has the names of those who were lost in the First World War, and on the sides those who served in that war. On the podium is a panel with the names of those lost in the Second World War.
Telephone kiosk 53.65198°N 0.08421°W		1935	The telephone kiosk is of the K6 type designed by Giles Gilbert Scott. Constructed in cast iron with a square plan and a dome, it has three unperforated crowns in the top panels.
