= Paull =

Village and civil parish in the East Riding of Yorkshire, England

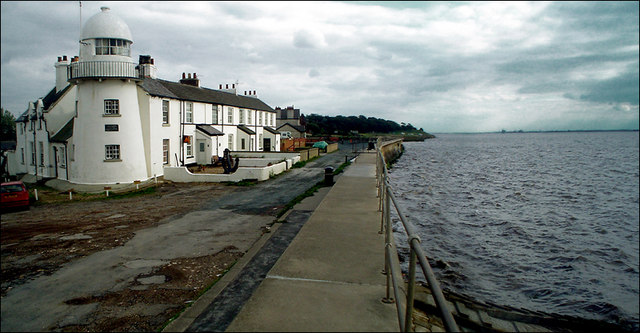
- The Humber Estuary bank and Lighthouse at Paull (2006)

- Location within the East Riding of Yorkshire
- Population: 723 (2011 census)
- OS grid reference: TA166262
  - London: 150 mi (240 km) S
- Civil parish: Paull
- Unitary authority: East Riding of Yorkshire
- Ceremonial county: East Riding of Yorkshire
- Region: Yorkshire and the Humber
- Country: England
- Sovereign state: United Kingdom
- Post town: HULL
- Postcode district: HU12
- Dialling code: 01482
- Police: Humberside
- Fire: Humberside
- Ambulance: Yorkshire
- UK Parliament: Beverley and Holderness

Paull (archaic Paul, Pall, Pawle, Pawel, Paulle, Paghel, Paghill, Paghil, Pagula) is a village and civil parish in Holderness, in the East Riding of Yorkshire, England, lying on the north bank of the Humber Estuary, east of the watercourse known as Hedon Haven.

The village is situated approximately 6 miles (10 km) east of Kingston upon Hull.

== Geography ==
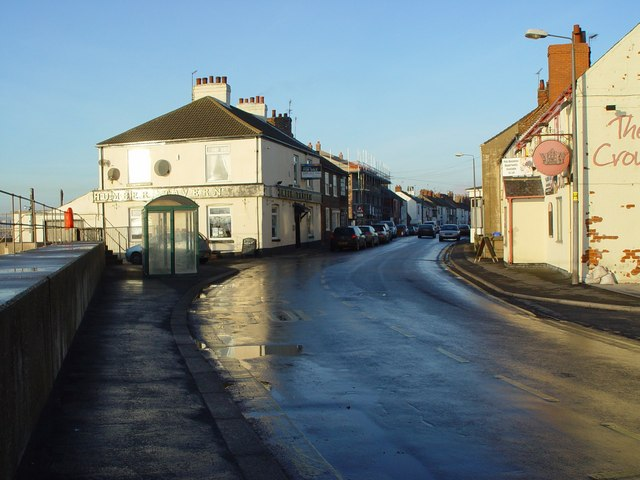
Main Street, Paull village (2007)

The western part of the civil parish of Paull centred on the village of Paull on the banks of the Humber Estuary and is bounded by the Hedon Haven watercourse to the west and north, and the Humber Estuary to the south; the north-eastern boundary of the parish is coincident with the Newton Garth, Haylands, Green's, Riggs, and South Ends & Thorney drains; the parish extends approximately 6 miles (10 km) south-east along the bank on a strip approximately 0.8 miles (1.3 km) wide and 6 miles (10 km) from Paull bordered to the north by the Sands and Keyingham drains, and the 'Old Channel', with the Ottringham Drain at the eastern boundary. To the north and west are the town of Hedon and the Salt End refinery and chemical works in the parish of Hedon. The other bounding parishes from west to east are Thorngumbald, Keyingham, Ottringham and Sunk Island.

The land in the civil parish is in agricultural use, and is low lying, mostly below 16 feet (5 m) above sea level, and extensively drained by canals and ditches. There are minor rises north and east of Paull at Rose Hill, Boreas Hill, and Holme Hill were the altitude reaches approximately 33 feet (10 m); there is a similar rise at the Paull battery, adjacent south-east of Paull. (Note: The higher points of ground around Paull are glacial moraines, generally consist sand, clay and gravel. Similar high points exist at Burstwick where the gravel was extracted.Sheppard (1912, pp. 17–18, 31–32)) Along the Humber banks are extensive tidal mud flats. According to the 2011 UK census, Paull parish had a population of 723, a decrease on the 2001 UK census figure of 765.

The banks of the Humber require flood defences, with all of the parish within the floodplain of the Humber Estuary. As of 2008 the flood defences are thought to be in good condition, with standard of protection is estimate to be to a 1 in 80 or 1 in 100 years flood event. At Paull Holme Strays the flood protection banks have been cut (2004) to form a tidal mud flat based nature reserve.

There are historic structures at Paull battery (now a museum Fort Paull) and Paull Holme Tower.

=== Paull village ===
Paull village is the only habitation of significance in the parish, excluding farms. Paull village is accessed via a road off the A1033. Paull village includes a church, lighthouse, two pubs (The Royal Oak and Humber Tavern), a village hall and a school.

Paull also had a small Medium Wave transmitter site from which the signals for BBC Radio Humberside, Absolute Radio and Talksport were transmitted. This was switched off in January 2018, with radio being centred on FM and DAB broadcasts.

== History ==
=== Etymology ===
The name Paull probably derives from the Old English pagol meaning 'stake', possibly referring to one used as a boundary marker or as a landmark.

=== Village ===
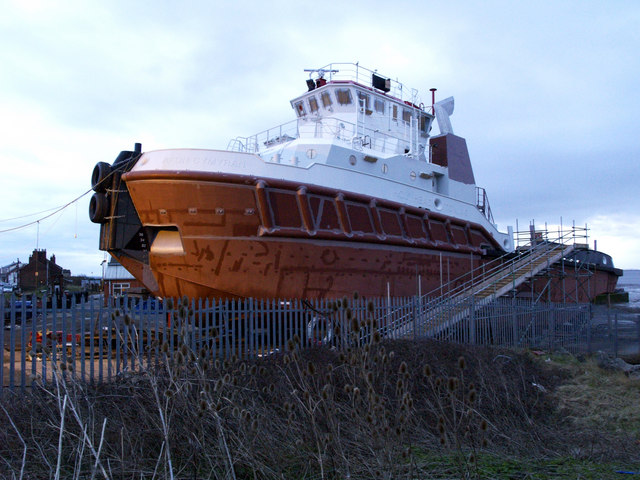
Tug under construction at Hepworth's shipyard (2008)

It is a fishing place, and celebrated for shrimps.

— History and Topography of York .. (1856), Sheahan & Whellan.

Both Paull (Paghel) are listed in the Domesday Book as places within the Manor of Burstwick. The place is typical of a medieval settlement in Holderness, occupying higher, and better drained ground in an area prone to flooding.

In the medieval period there were three settlements: Paull Fleet (archaic Paul-flete, later Low Paull) near the outfall of the Hedon Haven onto Humber; Up Paull (or Over Paull, later High Paull); and Paull Holme. Paull Fleet and Up/Over Paull merged into a single village Paull in the 16th century. (Note: Smith (2011) and English (1979) suggest Paull Fleet may have been lost to the Humber.)

There was a shipyard at Paull located between High Paul and Paul, took advantage of the sloping beach at that position as a good place for launching ships. The yard built some ships for the Royal Navy: between 1739 and 1774 three warships were built, Thomas Steemson owned the shipyard in the early 19th century; ships of up to 74 guns were built, including HMS Anson of 1812. By the 1830s it was no longer active. (Note: Also HMS Owen Glendower (1808). Steemson also had a yard at Thorne, a list of ships built by Steemson for the Royal Navy at both yards is given in: Sheahan (1864, p. 584))

Historically Paull was known for shrimp fisheries, in around 1900 the lower part of Hedon Haven (or Paull Creek), and the Humber and Paull roads were access for a numerous fleet of small and medium-sized boats known as 'Paull Shrimpers'; the shrimps were caught in the Humber by beam trawling.

The population of the Township of Paull rose from 212 in 1801 to 473 in 1831, and to 600 by 1856.

The Humber Tavern was built 1805, the Royal Oak was also built in the early 19th century, the Crown Inn opened 1856. A Wesleyan Methodist chapel was built around 1810 in the village, there was also a Primitive Methodist Chapel, built 1851, then demolished and replaced with another chapel in 1871.

A new shipyard, Hepworths Shipyard, opened c. 1940.

In the second half of the 20th century, housing in Paull village expanded, initially along Back Lane/Road in the 1950/60s era; then south of Townend Road in the 1970s on a former Sports ground; and then south of Turpit on the new lane after Ferryman Park towards the end of the century. In 2013 a new village hall was opened, having received £464,494 in Big Lottery Fund funding.

=== Church of St Andrew ===
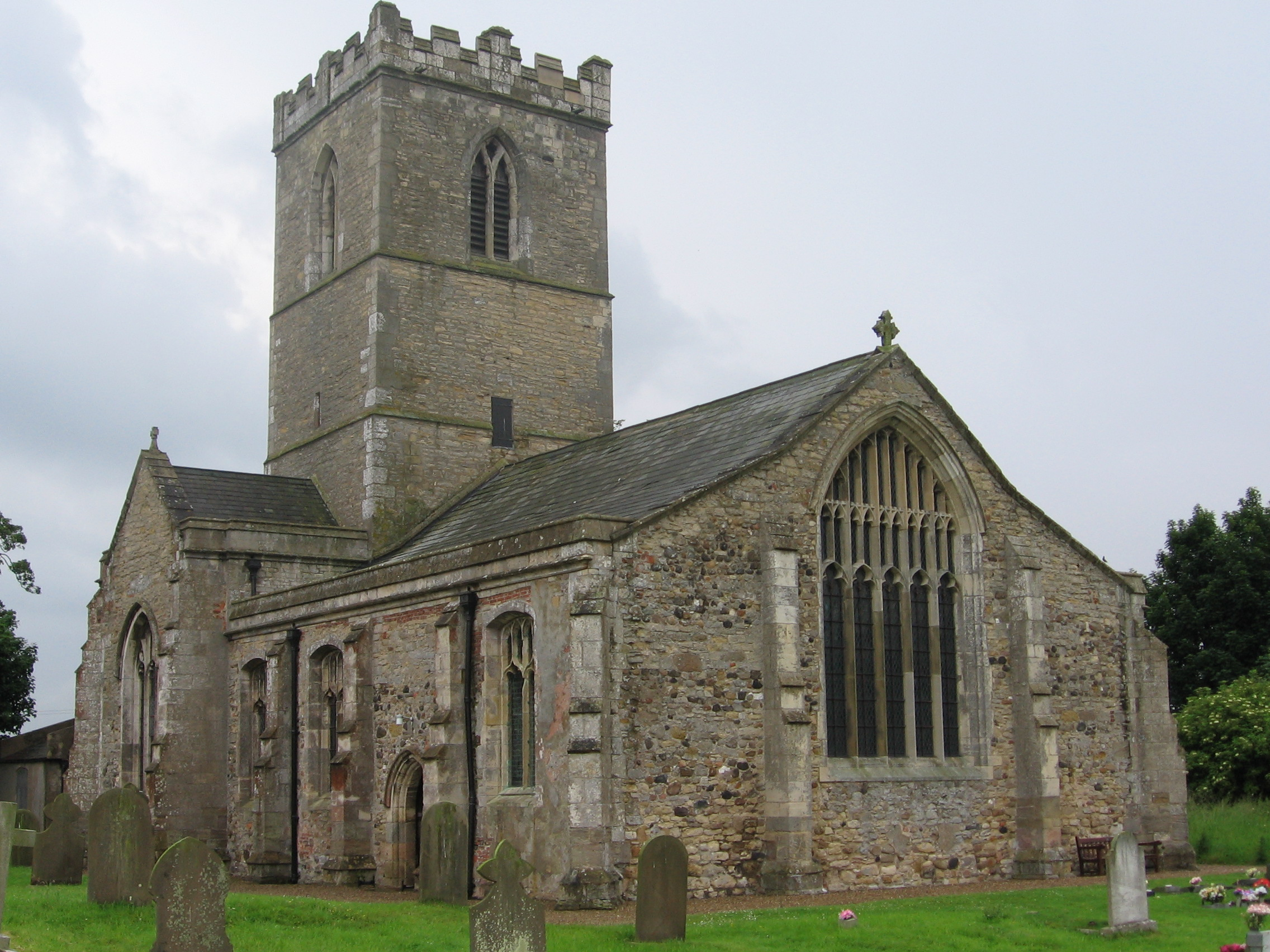
St Andrew's Church, Paull, north and west side (2007)

The Anglican parish church, St Andrew's Church, Paull, is a grade I listed building dating from the 14th century. Because the church was neither in Paul Fleet, High Paul, or Paul Home a saying arose:

High Paul, and Low Paul, Paul and Paul Holme, There was never a fair Maid married in Paul town.

— anon,

=== Fortifications and military works ===
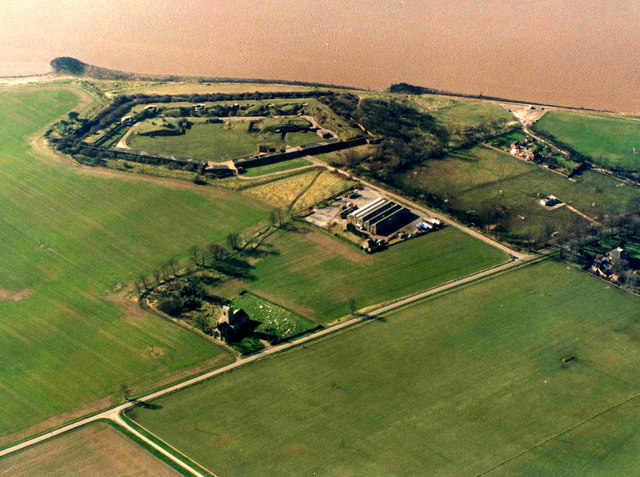
Aerial view of Paull Point from the south-west, with St Andrew's church (1995)

There are records of beacons along the Humber including one at Paull dating to the 16th century, used to give warning of enemy ships or invasion.

Paull has been host to coastal defences for centuries. In 1542, as part of a review of coastal defences carried out by Henry VIII to prepare against possible war with France and Spain, a battery for twelve gunners was built at Paull.

In the prelude to the First Siege of Hull (July 1642) a fort with cannon was erected at Paull (also at Hessle Cliff) by the Royalist faction in order to control shipping on the Humber, though in mid July around 2,000 soldiers, plus supplies were able to pass the fort without great inconvenience. In September the fort was repaired and another erected near the Trent Falls, again attempting to control the Humber, but were destroyed by Parliamentary ships.

In 1807, an earthen battery, Paull Cliff Battery, was erected in consequence of the Napoleonic Wars to house six 24 pounder cannons, with the land summarily purchased. In 1819 after the end of the wars the land of 3 acres (1.2 ha) including barracks and buildings was sold by the Board of Ordnance.

In the 1860s new defences of the Humber were built, following the decommissioning of the Hull Citadel. A smaller fortification at Stallingborough, Lincolnshire of six guns and a new 19 gun fort at Paull, on the site of the civil war fort were built. The Paull fort held 19 guns, and was constructed as a polygonal fort, with its main face of 620 feet (190 m) facing the Humber, with two flanking faces of 310 feet (94 m) – the defences consisted, from inside out – a wall with loopholes, and casemated Caponiers giving flanking fire across a dry ditch; the fort was protected from artillery fire by an earth glacis; and beyond that the sea wall was stockaded. The entrance to the battery was from the landward side, also protected by a loop holed wall. The barracks, and other soldiers buildings were adjacent to the rear wall. (Note: See Ordnance Survey Sheet 241SW 1952 edition. The fort was omitted from earlier editions.)

In the late 1880s a naval mine facility was built, adjacent west of the fort with access to the foreshore for the Humber Division Submarine Miners. The facilities included a 376 feet (115 m) pier, and a light railway to carry the mines to the piers. The Paull Point battery was also upgraded during the latter part of the 19th century, receiving two and four 9.2 and 6 inches (230 and 150 mm) breech loading guns, as well as four muzzle loaders – the breech loaders which were placed in new concrete emplacements (1894). Electric defence searchlights were installed in 1907. In the early part of the 20th century and First World War the role of the fort was reduced due to the construction of new emplacements nearer to the mouth of the Humber, at Sunk Island and Stallingborough, better able to protect the port of Immingham. During the First World War additional forts and gun emplacements were built at Spurn Point, Kilnsea, Bull Sand Fort and Haile Sand Fort, reducing Paull Point's military importance; however the site was retained as the headquarters for the defence of the Humber. During the Second World War the fort was the site of a ship Degaussing station, as well as being used as an ammunition store. Military use ended in 1956, and the site was sold in 1960/1.

Also in the near environs of the Paull Point installation were practice batteries south of the fort dating from the First World War, and 19th century, as well as a large warehouse, formerly a Second World War ammunition store.

During the Second World War decoys intended to represent features of the city of Hull with the intention to mislead Luftwaffe bombers were built around 5.5–6 miles (9–10 km) south-east of Hull at 1/3rd scale. The decoys included representations of the docks east of the River Hull (Victoria, Alexandra and King George V Docks), as well as the River Hull and Holderness Drain, with pole mounted lights shining on shallow concrete ponds to simulate reflections from the water of the docks and waterways. Other decoys included oil filled trenches that would be ignited to simulate an oil refinery (i.e. Salt End) under attack, and area were controlled fires were lit to simulate an area under aerial attack. There were further similar decoys in the Holderness and North Lincolnshire areas. There were also heavy anti-aircraft batteries located in the Paull area during the Second World War.

Post-Second World War military structures included a nuclear attack monitoring post on Holme Hill (Royal Observer Corps), used from 1962 to 1968.

=== Other places and features ===
==== Paull Holme ====
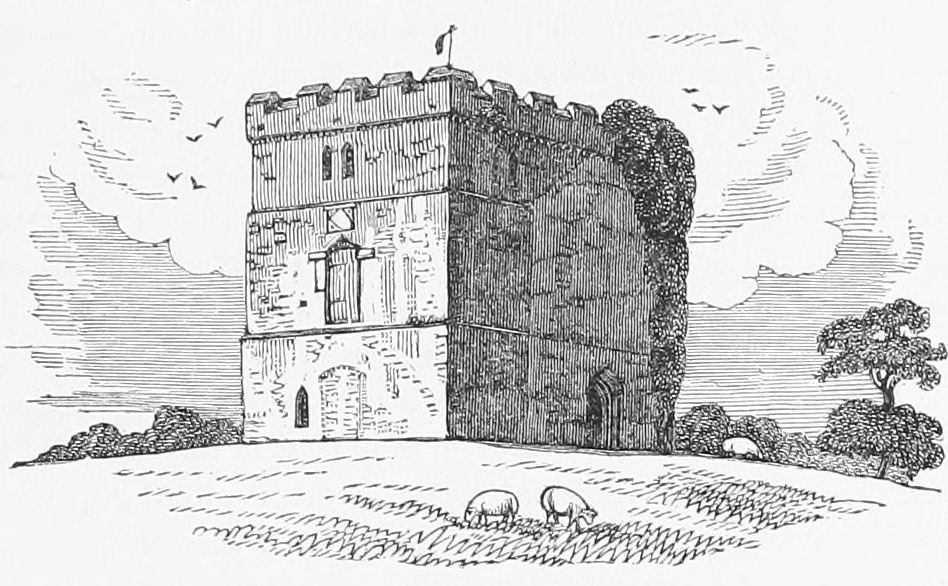
Paull Holme Tower c. 1840

Paull Holme (Holm) was also listed in the Domesday report, also in the Manor of Burstwick. The family of Holme held the place from the post Conquest period onwards, up to the 18th century when the estate passed to the Torre family through marriage to the female line of Holme. In 1377 the population was around 100.

There was once a manor house at Paull Holme. From remains of the foundations it is inferred to have been H-shaped; by 1840 only the north tower was still standing. A number of heraldic elements were present in the fabric, showing the connection to the Holme family, and, from rose emblems in the stone work, suggesting a date after Henry VII. (see Tudor rose.) The remaining tower is of brick, approximately 35 feet (11 m) high, in three storeys, with internal space of approximately 24 by 18 feet (7.3 by 5.5 m) each. The first floor was supported on a brick vault. It is thought the remainder of the structure would have included brick and timber-framed construction. (Note: A drawing of 1816 shows the tower with an adjacent wood framed house. Smith (2011, p. 13)) The building was restored in 1871 for use as a gazebo with stone window surrounds added, replacing brick. As of 2010 the tower was roofless and in a ruinous condition. The building is located on a formerly moated area. Some repair work was undertaken in 2014.

There was also a chapel in Paull Holme. Documentary evidence points to the chapel being in use at the beginning of the 16th century. By the end of the 16th century Paull Holme had become abandoned. The chapel was described as dilapidated by the time of Queen Anne (early 18th century). (Note: Some Victorian sources state that the old church was in Paull Holme, fell into decay, was demolished and the material used to build a church near High Paull House, which was then burnt during the English Civil War, demolished, and the material used to build a third (and present) church after the restoration of Charles II, e.g. Poulson (1841, p. 485), Sheahan & Whellan (1856, p. 842). This is very likely erroneous, and probably derives from an account in George Tickell's (1796) History of the Town and County of Kingston upon Hull. Smith (2011, pp. 41–42))

A newer house was built in 1837 at the foot of the hill at Paull Home.

==== Houses ====
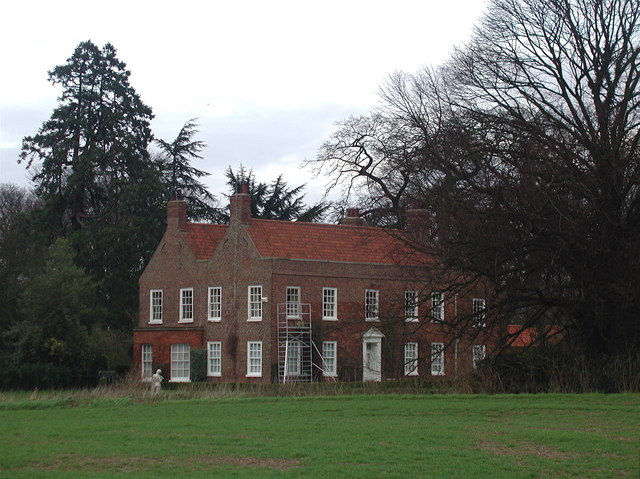
Boreas Hall (2007)

A hospital was established at Newton Garth east of Paul by William le Gros in the reign of Henry II. Originally intended for Lepers, non-Lepers were admitted after 1335. The hospital was suppressed by the Dissolution of Colleges Act 1547, in the reign of Henry VIII.

A house at Boreas Hill (archaic Boar House, Bower House Hill) dates to at least 1670. The present house is thought to date from the around the first half of the 1700s, with additions in 1936.

In 1769 High Paul and the manor of Paghil was acquired from the Constable family by Benjamin Blaydes, merchant and shipbuilder of Hull, for £6,700. A high status dwelling was built, "High Paull House". The house and estate of 95 acres (38 ha) was sold to the War Department c. 1860, and used to build the coastal defence fort "Paull Point"; the house was retained for military accommodation, stores and offices until the 1950s; the buildings were demolished in the 1950s and 60s, excluding a gatekeeper's lodge.

There are also listed buildings at Thorney Crofts (18th-century farmhouse), and Old Little Humber Farm (17th-century farmhouse on the site of a medieval moated area).

=== Transportation ===
The early medieval period the Counts of Aumale owned the ferry from Paul Fleet; in 1260 the ferry recorded a profit of 45s 3d; Paul Fleet was also a haven for boats in the same era.

A pier was noted at Paull in the 1840s. There was a wooden swing bridge across the Hedon Haven near to Pollard Clough on the far bank in the 1850s; this was no longer extant by the 20th century. (Note: The bridge included an adjacent bridge house, no longer extant by the 1920s. The course of the stream was straightened and moved north after the Second World War, with the former route forming (2014) a field boundary with the land north of the former route waste.) By the 1920s a footbridge close to the outfall of the Hedon stream had been built, crossing to Salt End; by the second half of the century the footbridge was no long extant, but a road had been built (Paull Road) running roughly north-west, with a bridge crossing over the haven, and joining the main Hull to Hedon road north of Salt End. The bridge over the Hedon Haven was a lifting bridge, Image replaced by a concrete deck fixed bridge in the late 20th century.

In 1967, an airfield was opened near to Oxgoddes farm, spearheaded by Neville Medforth of the East Yorkshire Aero Company. The airfield had a 1,000 feet (300 m) runway, and was used by the Hull Aero Club. Bristow Helicopters also used the site from 1969 to service North Sea oil rigs, and short haul operator Humber Airways from 1970 to its cessation of business in 1975. In around 1982 the airfield closed.

==== Lighthouses and beacons ====
Paull Lighthouse
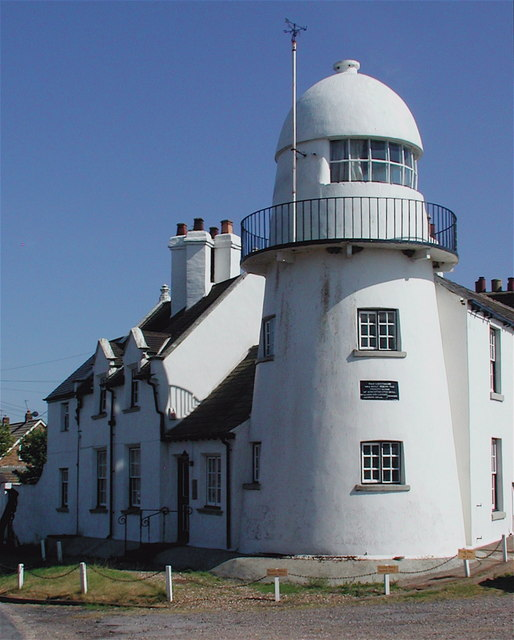
- The "Old Lighthouse"
- Location: East Riding of Yorkshire, England
- OS grid: TA 16613 26172
- Coordinates: 53°43′08″N 0°14′04″W

Tower
- Constructed: 1836
- Construction: masonry tower
- Height: 46 ft (14 m)
- Shape: massive cylindrical tower with balcony and lantern
- Markings: white tower and lantern
- Operator: private
- Heritage: Grade II listed building

Light
- Deactivated: 1870

In 1836 Hull Trinity House built a 40 feet (12 m) lighthouse at Paull, then between the shipyard and town. The three-storey, stuccoed brick tower was designed by Francis Dales (who also designed Killingholme South Low Lighthouse for Hull Trinity House the same year). Lit by oil lamps, initially it displayed a fixed white light; in 1852 a red sector was added to help guide vessels around the nearby Skitter sandbank.

In 1870 Paull lighthouse was replaced by two sets of leading lights, also established by Hull's Trinity House: one at Thorngumbald Clough and the other at Salt End. All four displayed a fixed white light. As described in the Notice to Mariners: "For vessels bound up the river, the present Killingholme lights serve as leading lights to the point where the new lights at Thorngumbald Clough will become leading lights, and the latter will serve as such until the two lights at Salt End are in one, when the last mentioned will guide a vessel up to the Victoria Dock Pier or to Hull-road". The new lights were first lit on 25 July 1870, and on the same date Paull Lighthouse was decommissioned.

Thorngumbald Clough Low Light is constructed of a wrought iron frame approximately 33 feet (10 m) high on a 6.6 feet (2 m) high brick and flagstone base, the Thorngumbald Clough High light is of a similar design. The high light is painted red, the low light white (initially it was painted yellow). The low light was originally on a trolley, enabling it to move up to 28 feet (8.5 m) so as to adjust to changes in the shipping channel. The Thorngumbald lights ceased operation c. 1948, but were restarted in 1952. As of 2015 both lights are still in use (owned and operated by Associated British Ports, Hull). Both are Grade II listed structures, as is the old lighthouse at Paull with its adjacent keepers' cottages.

The pair of lights at Salt End, the other side of Paull, were of near identical design and colour to those at Thorngumbald. They were dismantled in the 1960s when the BP oil terminal at Salt End was being expanded.

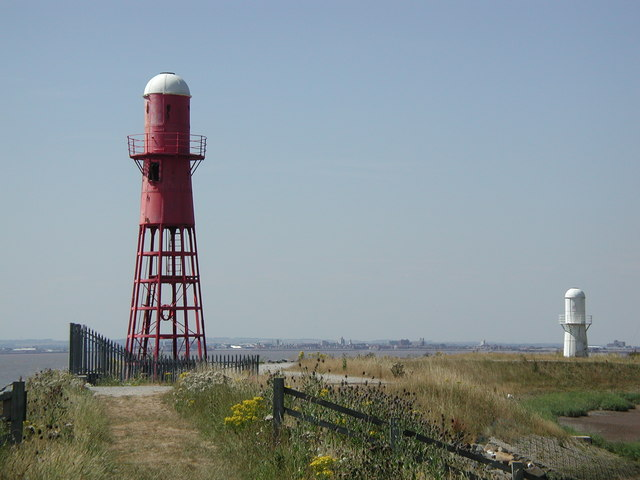
Thorngumbald Clough lights (2006)

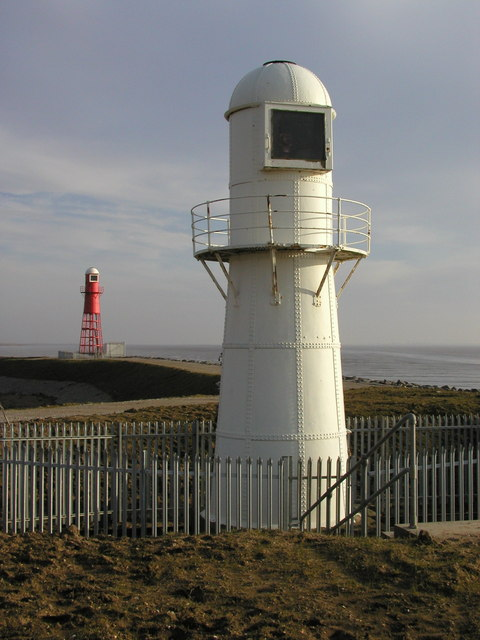
Thorngumbald Clough lights (2003)

There was also a lifeboat station in between High and Low Paul, established c. 1900 and closed 1920.

=== Land reclamation, drainage and flooding ===
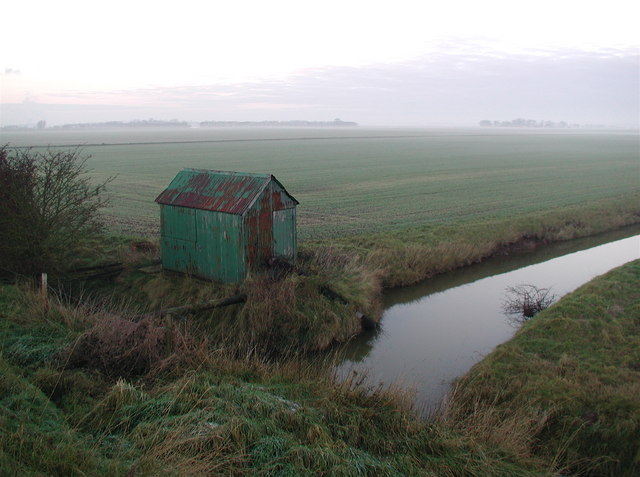
Cherry Cobb Sands (2006)

The earliest record of a sea wall in the area was at Paull Holme in 1201.

The position of the Humber coastline has been relatively fluid over several centuries due to flooding, storms, silting, human intervention, and the condition of Spurn Point. In the 17th century the bank of the Humber east of Paull was much further north; Cherry Cobb was a sand bank separated from the Holderness mainland by a navigable channel "North Channel" of the Humber. From the end of the 17th century to the beginning of the 19th century Cherry Cobb Sands (and Sunk Island to the east) silted up, reducing the north channel. The increased silting was exploited by humans; Cherry Cobb Sands was embanked in 1869/70, closing the north channel to the west. The silting caused drainage problems in the land to the north and Keyingham fleet (or clow) was resited several times in 1730, and again c. 1772, when it became the jurisdiction of the Keyingham Drainage Authority; silting in the remnant of the north channel reduced the fleet's effectiveness and a new cut of the drain was made, based on one of two designs of Joseph Hodskinson, endorsed by William Chapman in 1797, and enabled by and act of Parliament in 1802. The new cut ran roughly south-east to Stone Creek Clow (the present location of the outlet).

By the 1840s the extent of Cherry Cobb Sands represented approximately 1,800 acres (730 ha); the soil newly reclaimed land was of very good agricultural quality.

In the early 2000s the flood defences at Paull Holme Strays were re-aligned backwards to create a tidal lagoon. Construction of the new defences was completed in 2002, and in 2003 the old flood banks were cut, creating a 200 acres (80 ha) nature reserve.

The North Sea tidal surge 2013 caused damage to the defences near Paull; 12 properties were flooded.

In 2016, the sea wall through the village was topped with 3-foot (0.9 m) high glass panelling at a cost of £835,000. Creating the longest glass barrier of its kind in Britain at 1,700-foot (520 m) long and designed to protect 14,000 homes.

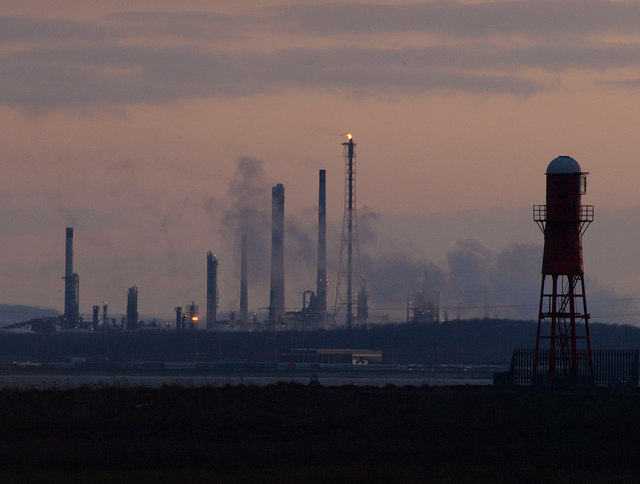
Paull Lighthouses with Killingholme in the background

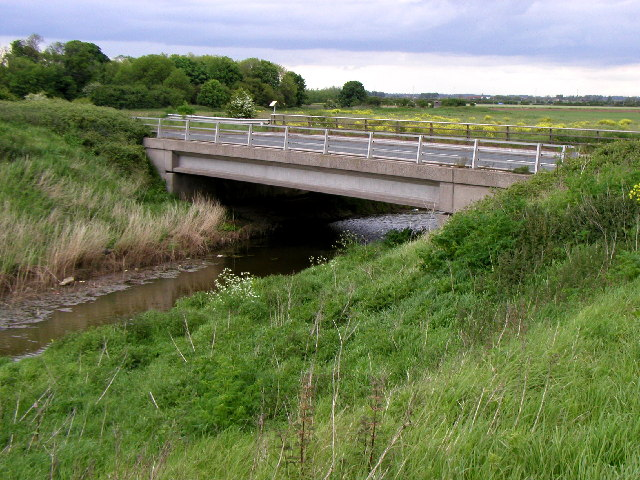
Concrete bridge over Hedon Haven, Paull Road (2005)

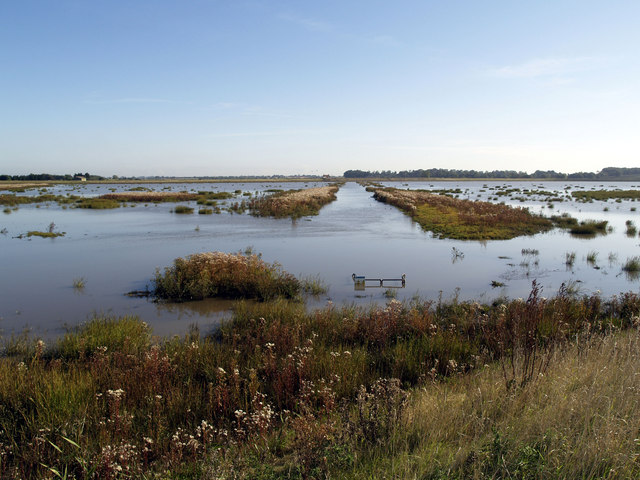
Paull Holme Strays lagoon (2007)

== See also ==
- Listed buildings in Paull
- Humber Gas Tunnel
