= Sunk Island =

Village and civil parish in the East Riding of Yorkshire, England

Coordinates: 53.6524°N 0.0844°W

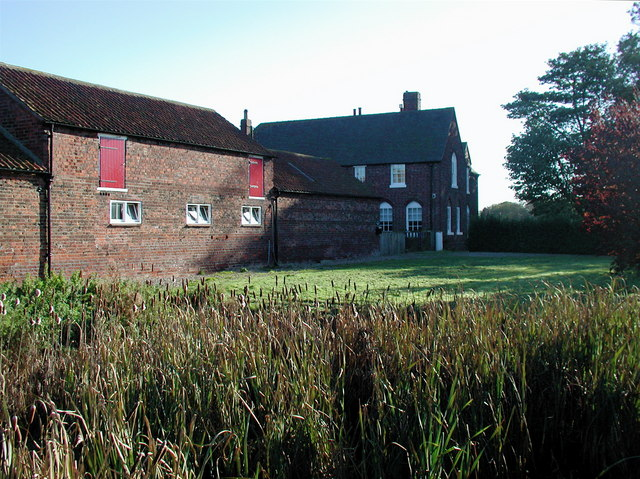
- Church Farm

- Location within the East Riding of Yorkshire
- Population: 228 (2011 census)
- OS grid reference: TA267190
- Civil parish: Sunk Island
- Unitary authority: East Riding of Yorkshire
- Ceremonial county: East Riding of Yorkshire
- Region: Yorkshire and the Humber
- Country: England
- Sovereign state: United Kingdom
- Post town: HULL
- Postcode district: HU12
- Dialling code: 01964
- Police: Humberside
- Fire: Humberside
- Ambulance: Yorkshire
- UK Parliament: Beverley and Holderness

Sunk Island is a Crown Estate village and civil parish in the East Riding of Yorkshire, England. It lies 3 1/2 miles (6 km) south of Ottringham and 1 mile (1.6 km) to the north of the Humber Estuary. The Greenwich Meridian passes through the east of the parish.

According to the 2011 UK census, Sunk Island parish had a population of 228, an increase on the 2001 UK census figure of 224.

== History ==
Sunk Island originated as a sand bank in the Humber Estuary; at first it was open sea, then sand accumulated there until visible at low tides, then at all tides. Colonel Anthony Gilby made the outer banks, empoldering it and making it useful for pasturage, under lease/gift from the crown.

By the reign of Charles I of England, it was said to form a 7-acre (3 ha) island, 1 1/2 miles (2.4 km) from the mainland. From 1663, the land around it was gradually drained, and by the mid-18th century, the channel separating it from the shore had entirely silted up. It was parished in 1831. The island has an area of 11,305-acre (4,575 ha).

There is an account of the island from 1711 by the Reverend Francis Brokesby of Shottesbrooke, which was reproduced in 1799. This account was originally written as a contribution to Leland's Itinerary, vol vi, p96. "The Island of Sunk, in Humber, figured in the map of the East-Riding of Yorkshire, in the last edition of The Brittania, and indeed could not be in those of Mr Camden's setting forth, because not then nor many years after in being. It was spoken of as a novelty when I first went into Yorkshire, forty four years ago. A little after which time it was bestowed on Colonel Anthony Gilby, then Deputy-Governor of Hull, by a grant from King Charles II. It is reported to be at first a great bank of sand, (of which there are still many to be seen in Humber at low water) that at thereat other mud and mattter stopt; and then still more and more by degrees, until it arrived at its present bigness."

The Reverend Brokesby then gives an account from someone who lived on the Island, as follows:

The Island, when it was given to Colonel A.G. was never quite overflown but at spring tides. At neap tides (as I am informed by some of the oldest mariners in this place) it was constantly, for as long as they remember, dry and had on the highest parts grass. It is reckoned about seven miles about, and is of an oblong figure; and is separated from Holderness by a channel near two miles broad, which as low water is almost dry, and in forty of fifty years (according to the computations of people who live near it, and who pretend to ground their account on good observations) is expected to be wholly filled up, and the island joined to the main land, if that be a proper expression when a smaller island is joined to a larger. Ir produces all sort of grain, but especially barley and oats, which comes to much greater perfection than in any other part of Yorkshire besides, or in the neighbouring counties. Besides these, there grows a great deal of woad, which is a plant for dying with, or at least to giving the ground for blue and green, as I am informed. There are near 2000 acres enclosed with high banks to keep out the sea, which otherwise would overflow the island at spring tides. Besides this, there are six or seven hundred acres more of very good ground, and as fine grass as any in England, not enclosed, and therefore frequently overflown at high tides, on which they feed a great many horses and sheep. But tho' it be overflown, the water rises not much above the ground, so that it is soon dry again. Most of these horses and sheep are bred upon the island and thrive very well; especially the horses, which are chiefly of the large size for coaches. They have lately put several thousand couples of black rabbits upon it, whose furs are more valuable than the common grey. ..... There are three houses upon the island and nightmen to keep care of the banks and other matters.

Cottages were built 1855–7 by Samuel Sanders Teulon, and a fort was built at the outbreak of the First World War.

== Today ==
Today, the settlement consists of a church, a few houses and various farms.

The parish church of the Holy Trinity, designed by Ewan Christian in the 1870s, is a Grade II listed building.

== See also ==
- Listed buildings in Sunk Island
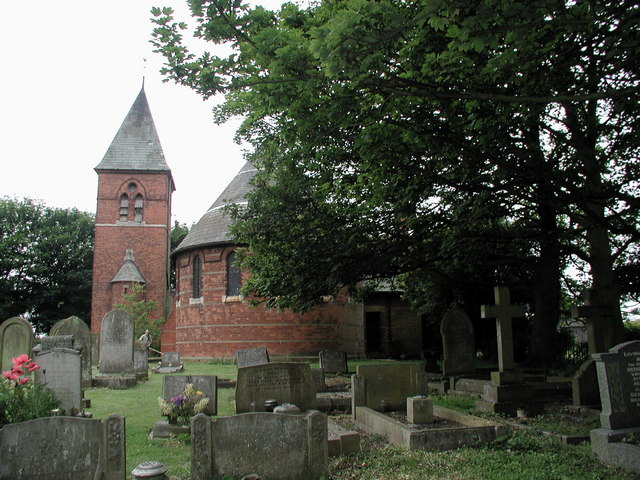
Holy Trinity Church

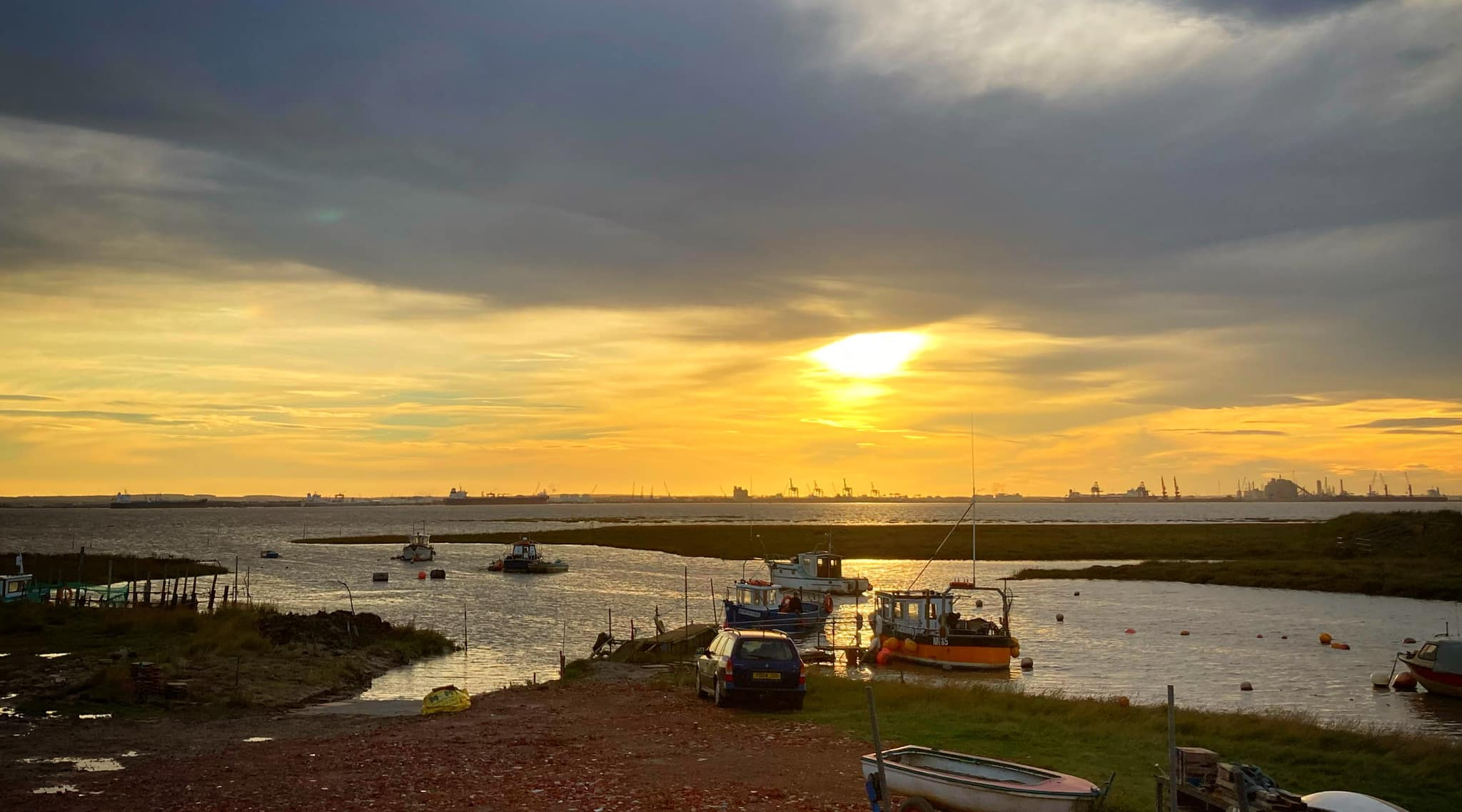
Stony Creek
