= Workmen's Compensation Act 1897 =

Act of the Parliament of the United Kingdom

Workmen's Compensation Act 1897 (Note: Section 10(1).)
- Act of Parliament
- Parliament of the United Kingdom
- Long title: An Act to amend the Law with respect to Compensation to Workmen for accidental Injuries suffered in the course of their Employment.
- Citation: 60 & 61 Vict. c. 37
- Territorial extent: United Kingdom

Dates
- Royal assent: 6 August 1897
- Commencement: 1 July 1897 (Note: Section 10(2).)
- Repealed: 1 July 1907
Other legislation
Repeals/revokes	Employers' Liability Act 1880
Amended by	Workmen's Compensation Act 1900
Repealed by	Workmen's Compensation Act 1906
Relates to	Employers' Liability Act 1880

Status: Repealed

Text of statute as originally enacted

The Workmen's Compensation Act 1897 (60 & 61 Vict. c. 37) was an act of the Parliament of the United Kingdom in operation from 1897 to 1946. Joseph Chamberlain, leader of the Liberal Unionist party and in coalition with the Conservatives, designed a plan that was enacted under the Salisbury government in 1897. The act was a key domestic achievement. It served its social purpose at no cost to the government, since employers were required to cover medical costs of injuries on the job. It replaced the Employers' Liability Act 1880 (43 & 44 Vict. c. 42), which gave the injured worker the right to sue the employer but put the burden of proof on the employee. After 1897, injured employees had only to show that they had been injured on the job. The act was modelled on German law, where roughly the same rights were awarded to workers in their 1884 law. However, the Workmen's Compensation Act 1897 did not require any form of risk pooling, such as insurance, on the part of the employers. As pointed out in the International Labour Organization 1935 "Report on Social Insurance", compulsory insurance was only introduced in 1934, and only for coal miners at first. The act was replaced by an expanded scheme under the Workmen's Compensation Act 1906, whereby insurance became mandatory on the part of the employers, thus introducing the first social insurance scheme into the British case.

The 1897 act only covered blue-collar, industrial workers. As pointed out by Brodie, "Until 1906 there was no general coverage in Britain. Unlike Germany, Britain's law did not require security for compensation". Thus, the British working population was only fully covered under employer liability after the passage of the 1906 act and full "social insurance" for work-injury only came later with Beveridge. Part of the confusion on this issue is that pensions, unemployment and health care all had developed more or less into social insurance in the early 1900s. It was only "workmen's compensation" that was not a social insurance scheme prior to 1941 and Beveridge.

== Definitions ==
A "workman" was defined as

... any person who is engaged in an employment to which this Act applies, whether by way of manual labour or otherwise. — Workmen's Compensation Act 1897, section 7

Workmen's Compensation Act 1900 (Note: Section 2.)
- Act of Parliament
- Parliament of the United Kingdom
- Long title: An Act to extend the benefits of the Workmen’s Compensation Act, 1897, to Workmen in Agriculture.
- Citation: 63 & 64 Vict. c. 22
- Territorial extent: United Kingdom

Dates
- Royal assent: 30 July 1900
- Commencement: 1 July 1901 (Note: Section 3.)
- Repealed: 1 July 1907
Other legislation
Amends	Workmen's Compensation Act 1897
Repealed by	Workmen's Compensation Act 1906

Status: Repealed

Text of statute as originally enacted

The employments to which the act applied were stated to be railways, mining and quarrying, factory work and laundry work. This was extended to include employment in agriculture by the Workmen's Compensation Act 1900 (63 & 64 Vict. c. 22).

== Interpretation by courts ==
Courts took a restrictive interpretation of the act in Simpson v. Ebbw Vale Steel, Iron & Coal Co. A widow claimed for the death of a colliery manager who had been killed in an underground accident. Lord Collins MR held that her dead husband was outside the act's scope, because though the act extended to non-manual workers the victim "must still be a workman". He said the act:

presupposes a position of dependence; it treats the class of workmen as being in a sense inops consilii, and the Legislature does for them what they cannot do for themselves: it gives them a sort of State insurance, it being assumed that they are either not sufficiently intelligent or not sufficiently in funds to insure themselves. In no sense can such a principle extend to those who are earning good salaries.

== Subsequent developments ==
The whole act was repealed by section 17(2) of the Workmen's Compensation Act 1906 (6 Edw. 7. c. 58), which came into force on 1 July 1907.

== See also ==
- Workers' compensation
- Workmen's Compensation Act 1906
- Contracts of Employment Act 1963
- UK labour law
- English tort law

== Bibliography ==
- Jack J. Burriesci, "Historical Summary Of Workers' Compensation Laws" (March 7, 2001) 2001-R-0261 online
- D. C. Hanes, The First British Workmen's Compensation Act of 1897 (1968).
- Simon Deakin, 'The historical process of wage formation', in Linda Clarke et al., The Dynamics of Wage Relations in the New Europe (2000) pp. 38–9
- Simon Deakin, 'Welfare State and Contract of Employment', in Noel Whiteside et al., Governance, Industry and Labour Markets in Britain and France (1998) pp. 212 ff.
- Frankel, Lee K., and Dawson, Miles, M., Workingmen's Insurance in Europe, New York: Charities Publication Committee, 1911.
