= Employers' Liability Act 1880 =

Act of the Parliament of the United Kingdom

Employers' Liability Act 1880 (Note: Section 10.)
- Act of Parliament
- Parliament of the United Kingdom
- Long title: An Act to extend and regulate the Liability of Employers to make Compensation for Personal Injuries suffered by Workmen in their Service.
- Citation: 43 & 44 Vict. c. 42
- Territorial extent: United Kingdom

Dates
- Royal assent: 7 September 1880
- Commencement: 1 January 1881 (Note: Section 9.)
- Expired: 24 December 1888
- Repealed: 30 June 1948
Other legislation
Repealed by	Law Reform (Personal Injuries) Act 1948
Relates to	Workmen's Compensation Act 1897

Status: Repealed

Text of statute as originally enacted

The Employers' Liability Act 1880 (43 & 44 Vict. c. 42) was an act of the Parliament of the United Kingdom passed on 7 September 1880. It enabled workers to seek compensation for injuries resulting from the negligence of a fellow employee.

== Background ==
Prior to the passing of the act, it was impossible for a worker to hold his employer responsible for injuries caused by his foreman or another worker's negligence. This was because the standard line of thought on the matter at the time was expressed by the doctrine of common employment, which stated that “if the person occasioning and the person suffering the injury are fellow workmen, engaged in a common employment, the employer is not responsible.” This doctrine of common employment was first established in the 1837 Priestly v. Fowler decision Another legal principle at the time, supposedly dating back to the origin of English Common Law that “a personal action dies with the person entitled to maintain it,” (Actio personalis moritur cum persona) meant that the family members of a deceased worker could not claim compensation. Several workmen's associations wished to see the doctrine of Common Employment repealed, as they felt Priestley v Fowler ushered in an unfair and damaging interpretation of the law. In response, Parliament formed a committee to consider evidence on the subject in 1877, and after numerous drafts and revisions, the Employers' Liability Act 1880 was passed on 7 September. It is probable that the bill was passed as much out of a desire to correct inconsistencies with the fact that employers were responsible for any injuries to strangers caused by those in their employ.

== Provisions ==
The act states that any worker (or an immediate family member) is entitled to compensation for injury (or death) when the injury was caused by a defect in equipment or machinery, negligence of any person given authority over the worker by the employer, or an act or omission made by following the orders or bylaws of the employer or their representative. It also specifies that in the case of rail workers, an employer may be held responsible for the negligence of any person in "control of any signal, points, locomotive engine, or train upon a railway." The act also placed limits on how much compensation an injured party (or their representative if deceased) could seek. The maximum was set at what someone in the same job in the same location could have expected to earn in the three years leading up to the injury.

== Effects ==
The act provided a way for workers to seek compensation when it was demonstrated that the injury was caused by a fellow employee. However, if the person at fault was not a fellow employee – for example, if they were someone working on the same project but contracted to a different employer – then that person's common law liability would remain, and they would be the responsible party. Not all workers opted to rely on this legislation. Many chose instead to participate in benefit plans that were mutually financed by employer and employee, which would provide for compensation in the case of injury. As many as 25% of railway workers may have chosen to rely on these mutual insurance plans.

== Subsequent developments ==
The act was replaced by the Workmen's Compensation Act 1897 (6 Edw. 7. c. 58), which removed the requirement that the injured party prove who was responsible for the injury – instead they only needed to show that the injury had occurred on the job.

The whole act was repealed by section 1(2) of the Law Reform (Personal Injuries) Act 1948 (11 & 12 Geo. 6. c. 41), which came into force on 30 June 1948.

== See also ==
- United Kingdom labour law
- English tort law
- History of labour law in the United Kingdom
