= Law Reform (Personal Injuries) Act 1948 =

Act of the Parliament of the United Kingdom

Law Reform (Personal Injuries) Act 1948 (Note: Section 6(1).)
- Act of Parliament
- Parliament of the United Kingdom
- Long title: An Act to abolish the defence of common employment, to amend the law relating to the measure of damages for personal injury or death, and for purposes connected therewith.
- Citation: 11 & 12 Geo. 6. c. 41
- Territorial extent: England and Wales; Scotland; (Note: Section 5(2).)

Dates
- Royal assent: 30 June 1948
- Commencement: 30 June 1948 (Note: The Acts of Parliament (Commencement) Act 1793.)

Other legislation
- Repeals/revokes: Employers' Liability Act 1880
- Amended by: Fatal Accidents Act 1959; Northern Ireland Constitution Act 1973; National Health Service (Scotland) Act 1978; Social Security Act 1989; Social Security (Recovery of Benefits) Act 1997; National Health Service (Consequential Provisions) Act 2006

Status: Amended

Text of statute as originally enacted

Revised text of statute as amended

Text of the Law Reform (Personal Injuries) Act 1948 as in force today (including any amendments) within the United Kingdom, from legislation.gov.uk.

The Law Reform (Personal Injuries) Act 1948 (11 & 12 Geo. 6. c. 41) is an act of the Parliament of the United Kingdom. It was passed during the Labour government of Clement Attlee. It improved the legal position of employees suffering from work-related accidents. In particular, it abolished the doctrine of common employment and repealed the Employers' Liability Act 1880 (43 & 44 Vict. c. 42).
