= Workmen's Compensation Act 1906 =

Act of the Parliament of the United Kingdom

Workmen's Compensation Act 1906 (Note: Section 17.)
- Act of Parliament
- Parliament of the United Kingdom
- Long title: An Act to consolidate and amend the Law with respect to Compensation to Workmen for Injuries suffered in the course of their Employment.
- Citation: 6 Edw. 7. c. 58
- Territorial extent: United Kingdom

Dates
- Royal assent: 21 December 1906
- Commencement: 1 July 1907 (Note: Section 16(1).)
- Repealed: England and Wales and Scotland: 1 May 1926; Northern Ireland:
Other legislation
Repeals/revokes	Workmen's Compensation Act 1897; Workmen's Compensation Act 1900
Amended by	Workmen's Compensation (Anglo-French Convention) Act 1909; Workmen's Compensation (Illegal Employment) Act 1918; Workmen's Compensation Act 1923
Repealed by	England and Wales and Scotland: Workmen's Compensation Act 1925; Northern Ireland: Workmen's Compensation Act (Northern Ireland) 1923, Workmen's Compensation Act (Northern Ireland) 1927 and National Insurance (Industrial Injuries) Act (Northern Ireland) 1946

Status: Repealed

Text of statute as originally enacted

The Workmen's Compensation Act 1906 (6 Edw. 7. c. 58) was an act of the Parliament of the United Kingdom which deals with the right of working people for compensation for personal injury. The act expanded the scheme created by the Workmen's Compensation Act 1897 (60 & 61 Vict. c. 37).

== Provisions ==
The act fixed the compensation that a workman may recover from an employer in case of accident giving to a workman, except in certain cases of "serious and wilful misconduct", a right against his employer to a certain compensation on the mere occurrence of an accident where the common law gives the right only for negligence of the employer.

A 'workman' was defined as:

...any person who enters into or works under a contract of service or apprenticeship with an employer, whether by way of manual labour, clerical work or otherwise, and whether the contract is expressed or implied, is oral or in writing.

Exceptions were made, including non-manual workers employed on annual pay over £250, casual workers employed "otherwise than for the purposes of their employer's trade or business", outworkers and family workers. Hence specific exclusions were made at both the top and bottom end of the labour market.

=== Repealed enactments ===
Section 17(2) of the act repealed the Workmen's Compensation Act 1897 (60 & 61 Vict. c. 37) and the Workmen's Compensation Act 1900 (63 & 64 Vict. c. 22).

== Subsequent developments ==
The act was amended by the Workmen's Compensation Act 1923 (13 & 14 Geo. 5. c. 42)

The whole act was repealed for Great Britain by section 50(2) of, and the fourth schedule to, the Workmen's Compensation Act 1925 (15 & 16 Geo. 5. c. 84).

The National Insurance (Industrial Injuries) Act 1946 (9 & 10 Geo. 6. c. 62) abolished the scheme (except for transitional cases) and replaced it with one of state liability.

== See also ==
- Workers' compensation
- Workmen's Compensation Act 1897
- Contracts of Employment Act 1963
- UK labour law
- English tort law

== Bibliography ==
- Simon Deakin, 'The historical process of wage formation', in Linda Clarke et al., The Dynamics of Wage Relations in the New Europe (2000) pp. 38–9
