= List of acts of the Parliament of the United Kingdom from 1880 =

This is a complete list of acts of the Parliament of the United Kingdom for the year 1880.

Note that the first parliament of the United Kingdom was held in 1801; parliaments between 1707 and 1800 were either parliaments of Great Britain or of Ireland). For acts passed up until 1707, see the list of acts of the Parliament of England and the list of acts of the Parliament of Scotland. For acts passed from 1707 to 1800, see the list of acts of the Parliament of Great Britain. See also the list of acts of the Parliament of Ireland.

For acts of the devolved parliaments and assemblies in the United Kingdom, see the list of acts of the Scottish Parliament, the list of acts of the Northern Ireland Assembly, and the list of acts and measures of Senedd Cymru; see also the list of acts of the Parliament of Northern Ireland.

The number shown after each act's title is its chapter number. Acts passed before 1963 are cited using this number, preceded by the year(s) of the reign during which the relevant parliamentary session was held; thus the Union with Ireland Act 1800 is cited as "39 & 40 Geo. 3 c. 67", meaning the 67th act passed during the session that started in the 39th year of the reign of George III and which finished in the 40th year of that reign. Note that the modern convention is to use Arabic numerals in citations (thus "41 Geo. 3" rather than "41 Geo. III"). Acts of the last session of the Parliament of Great Britain and the first session of the Parliament of the United Kingdom are both cited as "41 Geo. 3". Acts passed from 1963 onwards are simply cited by calendar year and chapter number.

All modern acts have a short title, e.g. the Local Government Act 2003. Some earlier acts also have a short title given to them by later acts, such as by the Short Titles Act 1896.

== 43 Vict. ==
The seventh session of the 21st Parliament of the United Kingdom, which met from 5 February 1880 until 24 March 1880.

There were no local acts passed during this session.

=== Public general acts ===
Short title	Citation	Royal assent
Long title
Seed Supply (Ireland) Act 1880 (repealed)	43 Vict. c. 1	1 March 1880
An Act to enable Guardians of the Poor to borrow Money for the purpose of procuring Seed Potatoes and Seed Oats, and other Seed for Tenants in Ireland; and for other purposes. (Repealed by Statute Law Revision Act 1894 (57 & 58 Vict. c. 56) and Statute Law Revision Act (Northern Ireland) 1954 (c. 35 (N.I.)))
Artizans and Labourers Dwellings Improvement (Scotland) Act 1880 (repealed)	43 Vict. c. 2	15 March 1880
An Act to amend the Artizans and Labourers Dwellings Improvement (Scotland) Act, 1875. (Note: Artisans and Labourers Dwellings Improvement (Scotland) Act 1875 (38 & 39 Vict. c. 49)) (Repealed by Housing of the Working Classes Act 1890 (53 & 54 Vict. c. 70))
Indian Salaries and Allowances Act 1880 (repealed)	43 Vict. c. 3	15 March 1880
An Act to amend the Law relating to the Salaries and Allowances of certain Officers in India, and for other purposes relating thereto. (Repealed by Government of India Act 1915 (5 & 6 Geo. 5. c. 61))
Relief of Distress (Ireland) Act 1880 (repealed)	43 Vict. c. 4	15 March 1880
An Act to render valid certain proceedings taken for the Relief of Distress in Ireland, and to make further provision for such Relief; and for other purposes. (Repealed by Public Works &c Loans Act (Northern Ireland) 1953 (c. 13 (N.I.)))
Consolidated Fund (No. 1) Act 1880 (repealed)	43 Vict. c. 5	15 March 1880
An Act to apply certain Sums out of the Consolidated Fund to the service of the years ending on the thirty-first day of March one thousand eight hundred and eighty, and one thousand eight hundred and eighty-one. (Repealed by Statute Law Revision Act 1894 (57 & 58 Vict. c. 56))
Beer Dealers Retail Licences Act 1880 (repealed)	43 Vict. c. 6	19 March 1880
An Act for amending the law relating to the grant by Justices of Certificates for Beer Dealers Retail Licences. (Repealed by Licensing Act 1902 (2 Edw. 7. c. 28))
Roads Amendment Act 1880 (repealed)	43 Vict. c. 7	19 March 1880
An Act to amend the Law in regard to charging Road Debts on Entailed Estates in Scotland. (Repealed by Statute Law (Repeals) Act 1973 (c. 39))
Artizans' Dwellings Act (1868) Amendment Act (1879) Amendment Act 1880 (repealed)	43 Vict. c. 8	19 March 1880
An Act to explain and amend the twenty-second section of the Artizans and Labourers Dwellings Act, 1868, Amendment Act, 1879. (Note: Artizans and Labourers Dwellings Act (1868) Amendment Act 1879 (42 & 43 Vict. c. 64) (Repealed by Housing of the Working Classes Act 1890 (53 & 54 Vict. c. 70))
Army Discipline and Regulation (Annual) Act 1880 (repealed)	43 Vict. c. 9	19 March 1880
An Act to provide during twelve months for the Discipline and Regulation of the Army. (Repealed by Statute Law Revision Act 1894 (57 & 58 Vict. c. 56))
East India Loan (East Indian Railway Debentures) Act 1880 (repealed)	43 Vict. c. 10	19 March 1880
An Act to enable the Secretary of State in Council of India to raise money in the United Kingdom for the purpose of paying off or redeeming Debentures of the East Indian Railway Company. (Repealed by East India Loans Act 1937 (1 Edw. 8 & 1 Geo. 6. c. 14))
India Stock (Powers of Attorney) Act 1880 (repealed)	43 Vict. c. 11	19 March 1880
An Act to make Powers of Attorney and Requests for Transmission of Dividend Warrants by Post relating to India Five per centum Stock applicable to India Four per centum Stock. (Repealed by East India Loans Act 1937 (1 Edw. 8 & 1 Geo. 6. c. 14))
Hypothec Abolition (Scotland) Act 1880 (repealed)	43 Vict. c. 12	24 March 1880
An Act to abolish the Landlord’s Right of Hypothec for Rent in Scotland. (Repealed by Bankruptcy and Diligence etc. (Scotland) Act 2007 (asp 3))
Appropriation Act 1880 (repealed)	43 Vict. c. 13	24 March 1880
An Act to apply certain sums out of the Consolidated Fund to the service of the years ending on the thirty-first day of March one thousand eight hundred and seventy-nine, one thousand eight hundred and eighty, and one thou sand eight hundred and eighty-one, and to appropriate the Supplies granted in this Session of Parliament. (Repealed by Statute Law Revision Act 1894 (57 & 58 Vict. c. 56))
Customs and Inland Revenue Act 1880 (repealed)	43 Vict. c. 14	24 March 1880
An Act to grant certain Duties of Customs and Inland Revenue, to alter other Duties, and to amend the Laws relating to Inland Revenue. (Repealed by Industrial and Provident Societies Act 1893 (56 & 57 Vict. c. 39), Statute Law Revision Act 1894 (57 & 58 Vict. c. 56), Supreme Court of Judicature (Consolidation) Act 1925 (15 & 16 Geo. 5. c. 49), Finance Act 1949 (12, 13 & 14 Geo. 6. c. 47), Statute Law Revision Act 1950 (14 Geo. 6. c. 6), Customs and Excise Act 1952 (15 & 16 Geo. 6 & 1 Eliz. 2. c. 44) and Finance Act 1975 (c. 7))
National Debt Act 1880 (repealed)	43 Vict. c. 15	24 March 1880
An Act to authorise the Commissioners of Her Majesty's Treasury to borrow a sum on the security of Terminable Annuities, and to increase the permanent Annual Charge of the National Debt. (Repealed by National Debt and Local Loans Act 1887 (50 & 51 Vict. c. 16))
Exchequer Bills and Bonds Act 1880 (repealed)	43 Vict. c. 16	24 March 1880
An Act to raise the sum of sixty thousand pounds by Exchequer Bonds, Exchequer Bills, or Treasury Bills, for the service of the year ending on the thirty-first day of March one thousand eight hundred and eighty. (Repealed by Statute Law Revision Act 1894 (57 & 58 Vict. c. 56))
Town Councils and Local Boards Act 1880 (repealed)	43 Vict. c. 17	24 March 1880
An Act to abolish the property qualification for members of Municipal Corporations and Local Governing Bodies. (Repealed for England and Wales by Statute Law Revision Act 1894 (57 & 58 Vict. c. 56) and for Northern Ireland by Local Government Act (Northern Ireland) 1972 (c. 9 (N.I.)))
Parliamentary Elections and Corrupt Practices Act 1880 (repealed)	43 Vict. c. 18	24 March 1880
An Act to amend the Law relating to the Conveyance of Voters to the Poll, and to continue the Acts relating to the Prevention of Corrupt Practices at Parliamentary Elections and the Acts relating to Election Petitions. (Repealed by Representation of the People Act 1948 (11 & 12 Geo. 6. c. 65))
Companies Act 1880 (repealed)	43 Vict. c. 19	24 March 1880
An Act to amend the Companies Acts of 1862, (Note: Companies Act 1862 (25 & 26 Vict. c. 89)) 1867, (Note: Companies Act 1867 (30 & 31 Vict. c. 131)) 1877, (Note: Companies Act 1877 (40 & 41 Vict. c. 26)) and 1879. (Note: Companies Act 1879 (42 & 43 Vict. c. 76)) (Repealed by Companies (Consolidation) Act 1908 (8 Edw. 7. c. 69))

=== Private acts ===
Short title	Citation	Royal assent
Long title
Naturalization of Luitbert Rammingen Act 1880 (Note: This act was not printed by the Queen's Printer.)	43 Vict. c. 1 Pr.	19 March 1880
An Act to naturalize Luitbert Alexander George Lionel Alphons Freiherr Von Pawel Rammingen, and to grant and confer on him all the rights, privileges, and capacities of a natural-horn Subject of Her Majesty the Queen.

=== Sources ===
- The Public General Statutes, Volume 15: 43 Victoria – 1880. H. M. Stationery Office. – via HathiTrust.
- also – via Internet Archive.
- Journal of the House of Commons. Vol. 135. London: His Majesty's Stationery Office. pp. 3–118.
- Britain, Great (1880). The Public General Statutes: With a List of the Local and Private Acts Passed in the ... Years of the Reign of ... : Being the ... Session of the ... Parliament of the United Kingdom of Great Britain and Ireland. Vol. 15. G.E. Eyre and W. Spottiswoode, printers to the Queen's most excellent majesty. – via Google Books.
- Chronological Table of and Index to the Statutes. Vol. 1: To the End of the Session 59 Vict. Sess. 2 (1895) (13th ed.). London: Her Majesty's Stationery Office. 1896. p. 498 – via Google Books.

== 43 & 44 Vict. ==
The first session of the 22nd Parliament of the United Kingdom, which met from 29 April 1880 until 7 September 1880.

=== Public general acts ===
Short title	Citation	Royal assent
Long title
Public Works Loans Act 1880 (repealed)	43 & 44 Vict. c. 1	14 June 1880
An Act to appoint Public Works Loan Commissioners; to grant Money for the purpose of Loans by the Public Works Loan Commissioners and the Commissioners of Public Works in Ireland; and for other purposes relating to Loans by those Commissioners. (Repealed by Statute Law Revision Act 1898 (61 & 62 Vict. c. 22))
Glebe Loan (Ireland) Acts Amendment Act 1880 (repealed)	43 & 44 Vict. c. 2	29 June 1880
An Act to amend the Glebe Loan Acts (Ireland). (Repealed by Statute Law Revision Act 1894 (57 & 58 Vict. c. 56))
Consolidated Fund (No. 1) Act 1880 (Session 2) (repealed)	43 & 44 Vict. c. 3	29 June 1880
An Act to apply the sum of Four million nine hundred and twenty-five thousand three hundred and twenty pounds out of the Consolidated Fund to the service of the year ending on the thirty-first day of March one thousand eight hundred and eighty-one. (Repealed by Statute Law Revision Act 1894 (57 & 58 Vict. c. 56))
Judicial Factors (Scotland) Act 1880	43 & 44 Vict. c. 4	9 July 1880
An Act to provide for the appointment of Judicial Factors in Sheriff Courts in Scotland.
County Bridges Loans Extension Act 1880 (repealed)	43 & 44 Vict. c. 5	19 July 1880
An Act to make provision for borrowing in respect of certain County Bridges. (Repealed by Highways Act 1959 (7 & 8 Eliz. 2. c. 25))
House Occupiers in Counties Disqualification Removal (Scotland) Act 1880 (repealed)	43 & 44 Vict. c. 6	19 July 1880
An Act to amend the Representation of the People (Scotland) Act, 1868. (Note: Representation of the People (Scotland) Act 1868 (31 & 32 Vict. c. 48)) (Repealed by Representation of the People Act 1918 (7 & 8 Geo. 5. c. 64))
Union Assessment Act 1880 (repealed)	43 & 44 Vict. c. 7	19 July 1880
An Act to extend the Union Assessment Committee Acts to single parishes under separate Boards of Guardians. (Repealed for England and Wales by Rating and Valuation Act 1925 (15 & 16 Geo. 5. c. 90) and for the Isles of Scilly by Rating and Valuation Act (Repeals, etc.) Order 1927 (SR&O 1927/90))
Isle of Man Loans Act 1880 (repealed)	43 & 44 Vict. c. 8	19 July 1880
An Act to provide for the raising of Loans on behalf of the Isle of Man. (Repealed by Statute Law (Repeals) Act 1989 (c. 43))
Statutes (Definition of Time) Act 1880 (repealed)	43 & 44 Vict. c. 9	2 August 1880
An Act to remove doubts as to the meaning of Expressions relative to Time occurring in Acts of Parliament, deeds, and other legal instruments. (Repealed by Interpretation Act 1978 (c. 30))
Great Seal Act 1880 (repealed)	43 & 44 Vict. c. 10	2 August 1880
An Act to amend the Law respecting the Manner of passing Grants under the Great Seal, and respecting Officers connected therewith. (Repealed by Supreme Court of Judicature (Consolidation) Act 1925 (15 & 16 Geo. 5. c. 49))
Universities of Oxford and Cambridge (Limited Tenures) Act 1880 (repealed)	43 & 44 Vict. c. 11	2 August 1880
An Act to authorize the Extension and further Limitation of the Tenures of certain University and College Emoluments limited or to be limited by Orders of the Oxford and Cambridge Commissioners. (Repealed by Statute Law Revision Act 1894 (57 & 58 Vict. c. 56))
Annual Turnpike Acts Continuance Act 1880 (repealed)	43 & 44 Vict. c. 12	2 August 1880
An Act to continue certain Turnpike Acts, and to repeal certain other Turnpike Acts; and for other purposes connected therewith. (Repealed by Statute Law Revision Act 1894 (57 & 58 Vict. c. 56))
Births and Deaths Registration Act (Ireland) 1880 (repealed)	43 & 44 Vict. c. 13	2 August 1880
An Act to amend the Law in Ireland relating to the Registration of Births and Deaths. (Repealed by Births and Deaths Registration Act (Northern Ireland) 1967 (c. 25 (N.I.)))
Relief of Distress (Ireland) Amendment Act 1880 (repealed)	43 & 44 Vict. c. 14	2 August 1880
An Act to amend the Relief of Distress (Ireland) Act, 1880; (Note: Relief of Distress (Ireland) Act 1880 (43 Vict. c. 4)) and for other purposes relating thereto. (Repealed by Public Works &c Loans Act (Northern Ireland) 1953 (c. 13 (N.I.)))
Industrial Schools Act Amendment Act 1880 (repealed)	43 & 44 Vict. c. 15	2 August 1880
An Act further to amend the Industrial Schools Act, 1866, (Note: Industrial Schools Act 1866 (29 & 30 Vict. c. 118)) and the Industrial Schools Act (Ireland), 1868. (Note: Industrial Schools Act (Ireland) 1868 (31 & 32 Vict. c. 25)) (Repealed by Children Act 1908 (8 Edw. 7. c. 67))
Merchant Seamen (Payment of Wages and Rating) Act 1880 (repealed)	43 & 44 Vict. c. 16	2 August 1880
An Act to amend the Law relating to the Payment of Wages and Rating of Merchant Seamen. (Repealed for England and Wales and Scotland by Statute Law (Repeals) Act 1973 (c. 39) and for Northern Ireland by Industrial Relations (No. 2) (Northern Ireland) Order 1976 (SI 1976/2147 (N.I. 28)))
Revenue Offices (Scotland) Holidays Act 1880 (repealed)	43 & 44 Vict. c. 17	2 August 1880
An Act to make provision for Holidays in the Customs and Inland Revenue Offices in Scotland. (Repealed by Banking and Financial Dealings Act 1971 (c. 80))
Merchant Shipping Act (1854) Amendment Act 1880 (repealed)	43 & 44 Vict. c. 18	2 August 1880
An Act to amend the Merchant Shipping Act, 1854. (Note: Merchant Shipping Act 1854 (17 & 18 Vict. c. 104)) (Repealed by Merchant Shipping Act 1894 (57 & 58 Vict. c. 60))
Taxes Management Act 1880 (repealed)	43 & 44 Vict. c. 19	6 August 1880
An Act to consolidate Enactments relating to certain Taxes and Duties under the management of the Board of Inland Revenue. (Repealed by Finance Act 1963 (c. 25))
Inland Revenue Act 1880 or the Free Mash Tun Act (repealed)	43 & 44 Vict. c. 20	12 August 1880
An Act to repeal the duties on Malt, to grant and alter certain duties of Inland Revenue, and to amend the Laws in relation to certain other duties. (Repealed by Statute Law (Repeals) Act 1993 (c. 50))
Exchequer Bills and Bonds Act 1880 (Session 2) (repealed)	43 & 44 Vict. c. 21	12 August 1880
An Act to raise the sum of One million five hundred thousand pounds by Exchequer Bonds, Exchequer Bills, or Treasury Bills, for the service of the year ending on the thirty-first day of March one thousand eight hundred and eighty-one. (Repealed by Statute Law Revision Act 1894 (57 & 58 Vict. c. 56))
Merchant Shipping (Fees and Expenses) Act 1880 (repealed)	43 & 44 Vict. c. 22	12 August 1880
An Act to amend the Merchant Shipping Act, 1854, so far as regards certain Fees and Expenses and Sums receivable and payable by the Board of Trade. (Repealed by Statute Law Revision Act 1964 (c. 79))
Elementary Education Act 1880 or Mundella's Education Act (repealed)	43 & 44 Vict. c. 23	26 August 1880
An Act to make further provision as to Byelaws respecting the attendance of Children at School under the Elementary Education Acts. (Repealed by Education Act 1921 (11 & 12 Geo. 5. c. 51))
Spirits Act 1880 (repealed)	43 & 44 Vict. c. 24	26 August 1880
An Act to consolidate and amend the Law relating to the Manufacture and Sale of Spirits. (Repealed by Customs and Excise Act 1952 (15 & 16 Geo. 6 & 1 Eliz. 2. c. 44))
Metropolitan Board of Works (Money) Act 1880 (repealed)	43 & 44 Vict. c. 25	26 August 1880
An Act for further amending the Acts relating to the raising of Money by the Metropolitan Board of Works; and for other purposes relating thereto. (Repealed by London County Council (Finance Consolidation) Act 1912 (2 & 3 Geo. 5. c. cv))
Married Women's Policies of Assurance (Scotland) Act 1880	43 & 44 Vict. c. 26	26 August 1880
An Act to extend to Scotland the Facilities for effecting Policies of Assurance for the Benefit of Married Women and Children now in force in England and Ireland.
Drainage and Improvement of Lands (Ireland) Act 1880 (repealed)	43 & 44 Vict. c. 27	26 August 1880
An Act to amend the Law relating to the powers of Drainage Boards in Ireland to construct Works outside the limits of their Districts. (Repealed by Erne Drainage and Development Act (Northern Ireland) 1950 (c. 15 (N.I.)))
Census (Ireland) Act 1880 (repealed)	43 & 44 Vict. c. 28	26 August 1880
An Act for taking the Census in Ireland. (Repealed by Statute Law Revision Act 1894 (57 & 58 Vict. c. 56))
Courts of Justice Building Amendment Act 1880 (repealed)	43 & 44 Vict. c. 29	26 August 1880
An Act to amend the Courts of Justice Building Act, 1865. (Note: Courts of Justice Building Act 1865 (28 & 29 Vict. c. 48)) (Repealed by Statute Law Revision Act 1894 (57 & 58 Vict. c. 56))
Consolidated Fund (No. 2) Act 1880 (Session 2) (repealed)	43 & 44 Vict. c. 30	26 August 1880
An Act to apply the sum of Ten million eight hundred and eighteen thousand two hundred and seventy-four pounds out of the Consolidated Fund to the service of the year ending on the thirty-first day of March one thousand eight hundred and eighty-one. (Repealed by Statute Law Revision Act 1894 (57 & 58 Vict. c. 56))
Railways Construction Amendment (Ireland) Act 1880 (repealed)	43 & 44 Vict. c. 31	26 August 1880
An Act to amend the Railways Construction Facilities Act, 1864. (Note: Railways Construction Facilities Act 1864 (27 & 28 Vict. c. 121)) (Repealed by Statute Law Revision Act 1894 (57 & 58 Vict. c. 56))
Bastardy Orders Act 1880 (repealed)	43 & 44 Vict. c. 32	26 August 1880
An Act to render valid certain Orders in Bastardy. (Repealed by Statute Law Revision Act 1950 (14 Geo. 6. c. 6))
Post Office (Money Orders) Act 1880 (repealed)	43 & 44 Vict. c. 33	7 September 1880
An Act relating to Post Office Money Orders. (Repealed by Post Office Act 1908 (8 Edw. 7. c. 48))
Debtors (Scotland) Act 1880	43 & 44 Vict. c. 34	7 September 1880
An Act to abolish Imprisonment for Debt, and to provide for the better Punishment of Fraudulent Debtors in Scotland; and for other purposes.
Wild Birds Protection Act 1880 (repealed)	43 & 44 Vict. c. 35	7 September 1880
An Act to amend the Laws relating to the Protection of Wild Birds. (Repealed by Protection of Birds Act 1954 (2 & 3 Eliz. 2. c. 30))
Savings Banks Act 1880 (repealed)	43 & 44 Vict. c. 36	7 September 1880
An Act to amend the Savings Banks Acts. (Repealed by Trustee Savings Banks Act 1954 (2 & 3 Eliz. 2. c. 63))
Census Act 1880 (repealed)	43 & 44 Vict. c. 37	7 September 1880
An Act for taking the Census of England. (Repealed by Statute Law Revision Act 1894 (57 & 58 Vict. c. 56))
Census (Scotland) Act 1880 (repealed)	43 & 44 Vict. c. 38	7 September 1880
An Act for taking the Census of Scotland. (Repealed by Statute Law Revision Act 1894 (57 & 58 Vict. c. 56))
County Court Jurisdiction in Lunacy (Ireland) Act 1880 (repealed)	43 & 44 Vict. c. 39	7 September 1880
An Act to confer jurisdiction in Lunacy upon the County Courts in Ireland in certain cases. (Repealed by County Courts Act (Northern Ireland) 1955 (c. 21 (N.I.)))
Appropriation Act 1880 (Session 2) (repealed)	43 & 44 Vict. c. 40	7 September 1880
An Act to apply a sum out of the Consolidated Fund to the service of the year ending on the thirty-first day of March one thousand eight hundred and eighty-one, and to appropriate the Supplies granted in this Session of Parliament. (Repealed by Statute Law Revision Act 1894 (57 & 58 Vict. c. 56))
Burial Laws Amendment Act 1880	43 & 44 Vict. c. 41	7 September 1880
An Act to amend the Burial Laws.
Employers' Liability Act 1880 (repealed)	43 & 44 Vict. c. 42	7 September 1880
An Act to extend and regulate the Liability of Employers to make Compensation for Personal Injuries suffered by Workmen in their Service. (Repealed for England and Wales and Scotland by Law Reform (Personal Injuries) Act 1948 (11 & 12 Geo. 6. c. 41) and for Northern Ireland by Law Reform (Miscellaneous Provisions) Act (Northern Ireland) 1948 (c. 23 (N.I.)))
Merchant Shipping (Carriage of Grain) Act 1880 (repealed)	43 & 44 Vict. c. 43	7 September 1880
An Act to provide for the safe carriage of Grain Cargoes by Merchant Shipping. (Repealed by Merchant Shipping Act 1894 (57 & 58 Vict. c. 60))
Irish Loans Act 1880 (repealed)	43 & 44 Vict. c. 44	7 September 1880
An Act to explain and amend Sections Seven, Thirteen, and Fourteen of the Relief of Distress (Ireland) Amendment Act, 1880. (Note: Relief of Distress (Ireland) Amendment Act 1880 (43 & 44 Vict. c. 14)) (Repealed by Public Works &c Loans Act (Northern Ireland) 1953 (c. 13 (N.I.)))
Criminal Law Amendment Act 1880 (repealed)	43 & 44 Vict. c. 45	7 September 1880
An Act to amend the Criminal Law as to Indecent Assaults on Young Persons. (Repealed for England and Wales by Criminal Law Amendment Act 1922 (12 & 13 Geo. 5. c. 56) and for Northern Ireland by Criminal Law Amendment Act (Northern Ireland) 1923 (c. 8 (N.I.)))
Universities and College Estates Amendment Act 1880 (repealed)	43 & 44 Vict. c. 46	7 September 1880
An Act to amend the Universities and College Estates Act, 1858. (Note: Universities and College Estates Act 1858 (21 & 22 Vict. c. 44)) (Repealed by Universities and College Estates Act 1925 (15 & 16 Geo. 5. c. 24))
Ground Game Act 1880	43 & 44 Vict. c. 47	7 September 1880
An Act for the better protection of Occupiers of Land against injury to their Crops from Ground Game.
Expiring Laws Continuance Act 1880 (repealed)	43 & 44 Vict. c. 48	7 September 1880
An Act to continue various expiring Laws. (Repealed by Statute Law Revision Act 1894 (57 & 58 Vict. c. 56))

=== Local acts ===
Short title	Citation	Royal assent
Long title
Edinburgh and District Waterworks Act 1880 (repealed)	43 & 44 Vict. c. i	14 June 1880
An Act to enable the Edinburgh and District Water Trustees to borrow additional sums of money; and for other purposes. (Repealed by Edinburgh Corporation Water Order Confirmation Act 1924 (14 & 15 Geo. 5. c. lxxxvi))
Bristol (Alteration of Wards) Act 1880	43 & 44 Vict. c. ii	14 June 1880
An Act to alter the Boundaries of certain of the existing Wards and to create new Wards in the city of Bristol; and for other purposes.
Drainage and Improvement of Lands Supplemental Act (Ireland) 1880 (Note: This same short title was assigned to three different acts.) or the Drainage and Improvement of Lands Supplemental (Ireland) Act 1880	43 & 44 Vict. c. iii	29 June 1880
An Act to confirm a Provisional Order under the Drainage and Improvement of Lands (Ireland) Act, 1863, (Note: Drainage and Improvement of Lands Act (Ireland) 1863 (26 & 27 Vict. c. 88)) and the Acts amending the same.
	Garristown and Delvin River Order 1880 In the matter of Garristown and Delvin River Drainage District, in the counties of Dublin and Meath.	
Bury and Tottington District Railway Act 1880	43 & 44 Vict. c. iv	29 June 1880
An Act to authorise the Bury and Tottington District Railway Company to raise additional Capital; and for other purposes.
Aston (Liverpool Street) Burial Ground Sale Act 1880	43 & 44 Vict. c. v	29 June 1880
An Act to provide for the Sale of a Burial Ground of the parish of Aston-juxta-Birmingham, situate in Liverpool Street, in the borough of Birmingham; and for other purposes.
Carrickfergus Harbour Act 1880 (repealed)	43 & 44 Vict. c. vi	29 June 1880
An Act to make provision with respect to Mortgages by the Municipal Commissioners of the Borough of Carrickfergus and the Carrickfergus Harbour Commissioners of their respective Properties for the improvement of Carrickfergus Harbour; and for other purposes. (Repealed by Local Government (Modification and Repeal of Transferred Provisions relating to Harbours) Order (Northern Ireland) 1973 (SR&O(NI) 1973/313))
Vestry of Saint Luke, Middlesex, (Surplus Lands) Act 1880	43 & 44 Vict. c. vii	29 June 1880
An Act to enable the Vestry of Saint Luke, Middlesex, to lease and otherwise deal with Surplus Lands acquired by them in making Street Improvements.
Cardiff Waterworks Company's Act 1880	43 & 44 Vict. c. viii	29 June 1880
An Act for amending some of the Provisions of the Cardiff Corporation Act, 1879, (Note: Cardiff Corporation Act 1879 (42 & 43 Vict. c. cxxxiii)) and for conferring Powers upon the Cardiff Waterworks Company; and for other purposes.
Chester Gas Act 1880 (repealed)	43 & 44 Vict. c. ix	29 June 1880
An Act to enable the Chester United Gas Company to raise additional Capital. (Repealed by Cheshire County Council Act 1980 (c. xiii))
London and North Western Railway (Sutton Coldfield and Lichfield) Act 1880	43 & 44 Vict. c. x	29 June 1880
An Act for empowering the London and North-western Railway Company to construct a new railway to be called the Sutton Coldfield and Lichfield Railway; and for other purposes.
Glasgow Improvements Amendment Act 1880	43 & 44 Vict. c. xi	29 June 1880
An Act to enlarge the powers of the Lord Provost, Magistrates, and Council of the City of Glasgow as Trustees for carrying into effect the provisions of the Glasgow Improvements Acts of 1866 (Note: Glasgow Improvements Act 1866 (29 & 30 Vict. c. lxxxv)) and 1871. (Note: Glasgow Improvements Act 1871 (34 & 35 Vict. c. lxxiv))
Worcester and Aberystwyth Junction Railway (Abandonment) Act 1880 (repealed)	43 & 44 Vict. c. xii	29 June 1880
An Act for the Abandonment of the Railway authorised by the Worcester and Aberystwith Junction Railway (Deviation) Act, 1877; and for other purposes. (Repealed by Statute Law (Repeals) Act 2013 (c. 2))
Llanelly and Mynydd Mawr Railway Act 1880	43 & 44 Vict. c. xiii	29 June 1880
An Act for extending the time for the completion of the Llanelly and Mynydd Mawr Railway; and for other purposes.
Mersey Docks Act 1880	43 & 44 Vict. c. xiv	29 June 1880
An Act to amend the Provisions of certain Acts relating to the Liverpool and Birkenhead Docks with regard to Byelaws; and for other purposes.
Wednesfield and Wyrley Bank Railway (Abandonment) Act 1880 (repealed)	43 & 44 Vict. c. xv	29 June 1880
An Act for the Abandonment of the Railway authorised by the Wednesfield and Wyrley Bank Railway Act, 1875. (Note: Wednesfield and Wyrley Bank Railway Act 1875 (38 & 39 Vict. c. cxliii)) (Repealed by Statute Law (Repeals) Act 2013 (c. 2))
South London Tramways (Extensions) Act 1880	43 & 44 Vict. c. xvi	29 June 1880
An Act to authorise the South London Tramways Company to construct additional Tramways; to raise further Money; and for other purposes.
Denton and Haughton (Gas) Act 1880 (repealed)	43 & 44 Vict. c. xvii	29 June 1880
An Act to alter the provisions with respect to the dissolution of the Dukinfield and Denton Joint Gas Committee, and to make further provisions with respect to the supply of Gas to the townships of Denton and Haughton in the county of Lancaster; and for other purposes. (Repealed by Hyde Gas Order 1938 (SR&O 1938/648))
Swindon, Marlborough and Andover Railway Act 1880	43 & 44 Vict. c. xviii	29 June 1880
An Act for granting further powers to the Swindon, Marlborough, and Andover Railway Company.
Ely and Bury St. Edmunds Railway (Abandonment) Act 1880 (repealed)	43 & 44 Vict. c. xix	29 June 1880
An Act for the Abandonment of the Ely and Bury Saint Edmunds Railway. (Repealed by Statute Law (Repeals) Act 2013 (c. 2))
Prescot Gas Act 1880	43 & 44 Vict. c. xx	29 June 1880
An Act to enlarge the powers of the Prescot Gas Company and for other purposes in connexion with their undertaking.
Lancashire County Justices Act 1880	43 & 44 Vict. c. xxi	29 June 1880
An Act to authorise the construction of Waterworks for the supply of water to the Lunatic Asylum for the County Palatine of Lancaster, situate at Whittingham, in the said county; and to enable the Justices of the Peace for the said county to provide necessary courts, offices, and lock-ups for the holding of General or Quarter Sessions of the Peace within the hundred of West Derby in the said county.
Portishead Docks Act 1880	43 & 44 Vict. c. xxii	29 June 1880
An Act to extend the time for the Purchase of Lands authorised by the Bristol and Portishead Pier and Railway Company's Act, 1877, (Note: Bristol and Portishead Pier and Railway Company's Act 1877 (40 & 41 Vict. c. lxxix)) to be acquired, and to authorise that Company to raise additional Capital; and for other purposes.
Letterkenny Railway Act 1880	43 & 44 Vict. c. xxiii	29 June 1880
An Act to authorise alterations of the Gauge of the Letterkenny Railway and of the Londonderry and Lough Swilly Railway, for extending the periods limited for the compulsory purchase of certain Lands by the Letterkenny Railway Company, and for the completion of that Company's Railways, to authorise Agreements between them and the Londonderry and Lough Swilly Railway Company; and for other purposes.
Llantrissant and Taff Vale Junction Railway (Extension of Time) Act 1880	43 & 44 Vict. c. xxiv	29 June 1880
An Act for further extending the time for the completion of Railway No. 1 authorised by the Llantrissant and Taff Vale Junction Railway Act, 1866. (Note: Llantrissant and Taff Vale Junction Railway Act 1866 (29 & 30 Vict. c. ccxlviii))
Sligo, Leitrim and Northern Counties Railway Act 1880	43 & 44 Vict. c. xxv	29 June 1880
An Act to extend certain powers of the Sligo, Leitrim, and Northern Counties Railway Company; and for other purposes.
Chepping Wycombe Borough Extension Act 1880	43 & 44 Vict. c. xxvi	29 June 1880
An Act for extending the boundaries of the borough of Chepping Wycombe, in the county of Buckingham; and for other purposes.
Sutton Bridge Dock Act 1880	43 & 44 Vict. c. xxvii	29 June 1880
An Act to authorise the Sutton Bridge Dock Company to construct new works at Sutton Bridge in the parts of Holland, in the county of Lincoln; and for other purposes.
Liverpool Corporation Act 1880 (repealed)	43 & 44 Vict. c. xxviii	29 June 1880
An Act for making further Provision with respect to certain officers of the city of Liverpool in the county of Lancaster; and for other purposes. (Repealed by Liverpool Corporation Act 1921 (11 & 12 Geo. 5. c. lxxiv))
Doncaster Corporation Waterworks Act 1880	43 & 44 Vict. c. xxix	29 June 1880
An Act to empower the Mayor, Aldermen, and Burgesses of the borough of Doncaster to construct additional Works, to acquire Lands and Easements for that purpose; and for other purposes.
Hendon Local Board Act 1880	43 & 44 Vict. c. xxx	29 June 1880
An Act to enable the Hendon Rural Sanitary Authority to make certain payments to the Local Board for the Hendon Local Government District out of the income of trust estates and funds vested in the Edgware Highway Board by the Metropolis (Kilburn and Harrow) Roads Act, 1872, (Note: Metropolis (Kilburn and Harrow) Roads Act 1872 (35 & 36 Vict. c. xlix)) to vary the provisions of the said Act, to discharge the Hendon Rural Sanitary Authority from the obligation to maintain portions of a certain road, to impose on them the obligation to maintain another portion of the same road; and for other purposes.
Trinity Hospital, Greenwich, Leases Act 1880	43 & 44 Vict. c. xxxi	29 June 1880
An Act to establish and render valid certain Building Leases and a certain Agreement for a Building Lease of parts of the Estates of the Warden and Poor Men of the Hospital of the Holy and Undivided Trinity in East Greenwich, founded by Henry Howard, Earl of Northampton, commonly called Trinity Hospital, Greenwich.
Faculty of Physicians and Surgeons of Glasgow Widows Fund Act 1880 (repealed)	43 & 44 Vict. c. xxxii	29 June 1880
An Act for regulating the management of the Widows Fund of the Faculty of Physicians and Surgeons of Glasgow; for authorising a transfer of the Fund and its liabilities; for winding up the Fund; and for other purposes. (Repealed by Statute Law (Repeals) Act 1998 (c. 43))
Local Government Board's (Gas) Provisional Order Confirmation Act 1880	43 & 44 Vict. c. xxxiii	9 July 1880
An Act to confirm a Provisional Order of the Local Government Board under the provisions of the Gas and Water Works Facilities Act, 1870, (Note: Gas and Water Works Facilities Act 1870 (33 & 34 Vict. c. 70)) and the Public Health Act, 1875, (Note: Public Health Act 1875 (38 & 39 Vict. c. 55)) relating to the Borough of Conway.
	Conway Gas Order 1880 Provisional Order under the Gas and Water Works Facilities Act, 1870.	
Local Government Board's (Highways) Provisional Order Confirmation (Salop) Act 1880	43 & 44 Vict. c. xxxiv	9 July 1880
An Act to confirm a Provisional Order of the Local Government Board under the provisions of the Highways and Locomotives (Amendment) Act, 1878, (Note: Highways and Locomotives (Amendment) Act 1878 (41 & 42 Vict. c. 77)) relating to the county of Salop.
	Salop Order 1880 Provisional Order as to certain Disturnpiked Roads.	
Drainage and Improvement of Lands Supplemental Act (Ireland) 1880 or the Drainage and Improvement of Lands Supplemental (Ireland) Act 1880	43 & 44 Vict. c. xxxv	9 July 1880
An Act to confirm a Provisional Order under the Drainage and Improvement of Lands (Ireland) Act, 1863, and the Acts amending the same.
	Currygrane Order 1880 In the matter of the Currygrane Drainage District, in the county of Longford.	
Local Government Board's Provisional Orders Confirmation (Abingdon, &c.) Act 1880	43 & 44 Vict. c. xxxvi	9 July 1880
An Act to confirm certain Provisional Orders of the Local Government Board relating to the Boroughs of Abingdon and Beverley, the Local Government District of Briton Ferry, the Borough of Burnley, the Local Government District of Buxton, the Borough of Cardigan, the Town of Hove, the City of Manchester, the Improvement Act District of Middleton and Tonge, the Boroughs of Newbury and Southport, the Improvement Act District of West Hartlepool, and the Local Government District of Wirksworth.
	Abingdon Order 1880 Provisional Order for altering and amending a Local Act. (Note: Abingdon Improvement Act 1825 (6 Geo. 4. c. clxxxix))	
	Beverley Order 1880 Provisional Order for partially repealing, altering, and amending a Local Act (Note: Beverley Improvement Act 1825 (6 Geo. 4. c. cxxxviii)) and Confirming Act. (Note: Public Health Supplemental Act 1851 (No. 2) (14 & 15 Vict. c. 98))	
	Briton Ferry Order 1880 Provisional Order for altering the Briton Ferry Local Board Act, 1873. (Note: Briton Ferry Local Board Act 1873 (36 & 37 Vict. c. cxxii))	
	Burnley Order 1880 Provisional Order for partially repealing and altering a Local Act (Note: Burnley Borough Improvement Act 1871 (34 & 35 Vict. c. cliv)) and Confirming Acts. (Note: Local Government Board's Provisional Orders Confirmation (Belper Union, &c.) Act 1878 (41 & 42 Vict. c. cix)) (Note: Local Government Board's Provisional Orders Confirmation (Aspull, &c.) Act 1879 (42 & 43 Vict. c. cv))	
	Buxton Order 1880 Provisional Order for altering and amending certain Local Acts. (Note: Buxton Gas Act 1870 (33 & 34 Vict. c. lxviii)) (Note: Buxton Local Board Act 1873 (36 & 37 Vict. c. lvi))	
	Cardigan Order 1880 Provisional Order for partially repealing and altering the Cardigan Markets and Improvement Act, 1857. (Note: Cardigan Markets and Improvement Act 1857 (20 & 21 Vict. c. xxxviii))	
	Hove Order 1880 Provisional Order for altering the Hove Commissioners Act, 1873. (Note: Hove Commissioners Act 1873 (36 & 37 Vict. c. xcv))	
	Manchester Order 1880 Provisional Order for altering the Manchester Corporation Waterworks and Improvement Act, 1875. (Note: Manchester Corporation Waterworks and Improvement Act 1875 (38 & 39 Vict. c. clxi))	
	Middleton and Tonge Order 1880 Provisional Order for partially repealing, altering, and amending the provisions of a Local Act. (Note: Middleton and Tonge Improvement Act 1861 (24 & 25 Vict. c. c))	
	Newbury Order 1880 Provisional Order for altering the Newbury Borough Extension Act, 1878. (Note: Newbury Borough Extension Act 1878 (41 & 42 Vict. c. clxxxiv))	
	Southport Order 1880 Frovisional Order for partially repealing, altering, and amending certain Local Acts. (Note: Southport Improvement Act 1871 (34 & 35 Vict. c. cxl)) (Note: Southport Improvement Act 1876 (39 & 40 Vict. c. cxxvii))	
	West Hartlepool Order 1880 Provisional Order for altering the West Hartlepool Extension and Improvement Act, 1870. (Note: West Hartlepool Extension and Improvement Act 1870 (33 & 34 Vict. c. cxiii))	
	Wirksworth Order 1880 Provisional Order for partially repealing and altering a Local Act. (Note: Wirksworth Inclosure and Water Supply Act 1802 (42 Geo. 3. c. cx))	
Metropolitan Commons Supplemental Act 1880	43 & 44 Vict. c. xxxvii	9 July 1880
An Act to confirm a Scheme under the Metropolitan Commons Act, 1866, (Note: Metropolitan Commons Act 1866 (29 & 30 Vict. c. 122)) and the Metropolitan Commons Amendment Act, 1869, (Note: Metropolitan Commons Amendment Act 1869 (32 & 33 Vict. c. 107)) relating to Staines Commons.
	Scheme with Respect to Staines Commons.	
Local Government Board (Ireland) Provisional Orders Confirmation (Ballinasloe, &c.) Act 1880	43 & 44 Vict. c. xxxviii	9 July 1880
An Act to confirm certain Provisional Orders of the Local Government Board for Ireland relating to the town of Ballinasloe; and to the Ballymacormick Burial Ground; and to the towns of Clonmel and Tralee; and to Waterworks in the town of Wicklow.
	Ballinasloe Provisional Order 1880 Town of Ballinasloe. Provisional Order.	
	Ballymacormick Burial Ground Provisional Order 1880 Ballymacormick Burial Ground. Provisional Order.	
	Clonmel Provisional Order (No. 1) 1880 Borough of Clonmel. Provisional Order (No. 1).	
	Clonmel Provisional Order (No. 2) 1880 Borough of Clonmel. Provisional Order (No. 2).	
	Tralee Provisional Order 1880 Town of Tralee. Provisional Order.	
	Wicklow Town Provisional Order 1880 Town of Wicklow. Provisional Order.	
General Police and Improvement (Scotland) Act, 1862, Order Confirmation (Broughty Ferry) Act 1880 (repealed)	43 & 44 Vict. c. xxxix	9 July 1880
An Act to confirm a Provisional Order under the General Police and Improvement (Scotland) Act, 1862, (Note: General Police and Improvement (Scotland) Act 1862 (25 & 26 Vict. c. 101)) relating to the Burgh of Broughty Ferry. (Repealed by Dundee Boundaries Act 1913 (3 & 4 Geo. 5. c. lxxx))
	General Police and Improvement (Scotland) Act, 1862.	
Local Government Board (Ireland) Provisional Orders Confirmation (Banbridge, &c.) Act 1880	43 & 44 Vict. c. xl	9 July 1880
An Act to confirm certain Provisional Orders of the Local Government Board for Ireland relating to the towns of Banbridge, Monaghan, Thurles, and Trim, and to Waterworks in the town of Kinsale, and to the Skule Bog United District.
	Banbridge Provisional Order 1880 Town of Banbridge. Provisional Order.	
	Town of Monaghan Provisional Order 1880 Town of Monaghan. Provisional Order.	
	Town of Thurles Provisional Order 1880 Town of Thurles. Provisional Order.	
	Town of Trim Provisional Order 1880 Town of Trim. Provisional Order.	
	Kinsale Waterworks Provisional Order 1880 Kinsale Waterworks. Provisional Order.	
	Skule Bog United District Provisional Order 1880 Skule Bog United District. Provisional Order.	
Greencastle and Kilkeel Railway (Abandonment) Act 1880	43 & 44 Vict. c. xli	9 July 1880
An Act for the Abandonment of the Greencastle and Kilkeel Railway.
Clacton-on-Sea Special Drainage District Act 1880 (repealed)	43 & 44 Vict. c. xlii	9 July 1880
An Act to authorise the Construction and Maintenance of a Sea Wall and other Works at Clacton-on-Sea, in the county of Essex, and to provide for the Appointment of Commissioners for that purpose. (Repealed by Essex Act 1987 (c. xx))
Loose Valley Railway Act 1880	43 & 44 Vict. c. xliii	9 July 1880
An Act to extend the period limited for the compulsory purchase of lands for the Loose Valley Railway.
Newry Port and Harbour Act 1880	43 & 44 Vict. c. xliv	9 July 1880
An Act for the Incorporation of Trustees; for vesting in them Newry Port, Harbour, River, and Canal Navigation; for enlarging and improving the same, and making certain new Works in connexion therewith; and for other purposes.
Milford Docks (Extension of Time) Act 1880 (repealed)	43 & 44 Vict. c. xlv	9 July 1880
An Act to extend the Time for the Purchase of certain Lands and for the Construction of the Works authorised by the Milford Docks Acts, 1874 (Note: Milford Docks Act 1874 (37 & 38 Vict. c. lxvii)) and 1875. (Note: Milford Docks Act 1875 (38 & 39 Vict. c. clxxxv)) (Repealed by Milford Docks Act 1953 (1 & 2 Eliz. 2. c. x))
Eastbourne Gas Act 1880	43 & 44 Vict. c. xlvi	9 July 1880
An Act for conferring further Powers on the Eastbourne Gas Company for the Purchase of Land, the Construction of Works, the raising of Money, and otherwise in relation to their undertaking.
Didcot, Newbury and Southampton Junction Railway Act 1880	43 & 44 Vict. c. xlvii	9 July 1880
An Act for granting further Powers to the Didcot, Newbury, and Southampton Junction Railway Company; and for other purposes.
Helston Railway Act 1880	43 & 44 Vict. c. xlviii	9 July 1880
An Act for authorising the Construction of a Railway from the Gwinear Road Station of the West Cornwall Railway Company to Helston; and for other purposes.
Bristol Port and Channel Dock Act 1880	43 & 44 Vict. c. xlix	9 July 1880
An Act to authorise the Bristol Port and Channel Dock Company to make a new Entrance into their Dock, and to confer further powers upon them.
West Wickham and Hayes Railway Act 1880	43 & 44 Vict. c. l	9 July 1880
An Act for making a railway in the parishes of Beckenham, Wickham otherwise West Wickham, and Hayes, in the county of Kent; and for other purposes.
Aberdare Markets and Town Hall Act 1880	43 & 44 Vict. c. li	9 July 1880
An Act to incorporate a Company for establishing and holding Markets and Fairs and Slaughter-houses, and building a Town Hall in the Town of Aberdare, in the County of Glamorgan, and to authorise the Company to purchase the Undertaking of the Aberdare Market Company; and for other purposes.
Shrewsbury (Kingsland) Bridge Act 1880	43 & 44 Vict. c. lii	9 July 1880
An Act for the revival of the powers for making and maintaining a Bridge across the River Severn at Shrewsbury, with Approaches thereto; and for other purposes.
Stapenhill Bridge Act 1880 (repealed)	43 & 44 Vict. c. liii	9 July 1880
An Act for the abandonment of the Bridge authorised by the Stapenhill Bridge Act, 1865, (Note: Stapenhill Bridge Act 1865 (28 & 29 Vict. c. cccxiv)) and for the making and maintaining of another Bridge in lieu thereof; and for other purposes. (Repealed by Staffordshire Act 1983 (c. xviii))
Corris Railway Act 1880	43 & 44 Vict. c. liv	9 July 1880
An Act to amend the Corris, Machynlleth, and River Dovey Tramroad Act, 1858, (Note: Corris, Machynlleth, and River Dovey Tramroad Act 1858 (21 & 22 Vict. c. xcv)) and the Corris Railway Act, 1864, (Note: Corris Railway Act 1864 (27 & 28 Vict. c. ccxxv)) and to confer further powers upon the Corris Railway Company; and for other purposes.
Swansea Harbour (Extension of Time) Act 1880	43 & 44 Vict. c. lv	9 July 1880
An Act for extending the time limited by the Swansea Harbour Act, 1874, (Note: Swansea Harbour Act 1874 (37 & 38 Vict. c. civ)) for the completion of the Docks, Railways, and Works by that Act authorised, and for enabling the Earl of Jersey to act as a Harbour Trustee.
Southern Railway (Cashel Extension Abandonment) Act 1880 (repealed)	43 & 44 Vict. c. lvi	9 July 1880
An Act for the abandonment of the Cashel Extension Railway authorised by the Southern Railway (Extension and Further Powers) Act, 1873; (Note: Southern Railway (Extension and Further Powers) Act 1873 (36 & 37 Vict. c. ccxlviii)) and for other purposes. (Repealed by Statute Law (Repeals) Act 2013 (c. 2))
Wakefield Corporation Waterworks Act 1880	43 & 44 Vict. c. lvii	9 July 1880
An Act to authorise the Mayor, Aldermen, and Burgesses of the Borough of Wakefield to construct certain Reservoirs and Waterworks, to contract their limits of supply; and for other purposes.
Local Government Board's Provisional Orders Confirmation (Abergavenny, &c.) Act 1880	43 & 44 Vict. c. lviii	19 July 1880
An Act to confirm certain Provisional Orders of the Local Government Board relating to the Improvement Act District of Abergavenny (two), the Local Government Districts of Baldock, Bredbury, Bromsgrove, Cuckfield, and Ebbw Vale, the Hanley, Stoke, and Fenton Joint Hospital District, the Local Government District of Heckmondwike, the Borough of Pembroke, and the Local Government Districts of Swindon New Town, and Withington.
	Abergavenny Order (1) 1880 Provisional Order. to enable the Sanitary Authority for the Urban Sanitary District of Abergavenny to put in force the Compulsory Clauses of the Lands Clauses Consolidation Acts, 1845, (Note: Lands Clauses Consolidation Act 1845 (8 & 9 Vict. c. 18)) 1860, (Note: Lands Clauses Consolidation Acts Amendment Act 1860 (23 & 24 Vict. c. 106)) and 1869. (Note: Lands Clauses Consolidation Act 1869 (32 & 33 Vict. c. 18))	
	Abergavenny Order (2) 1880 Provisional Order for altering the Abergavenny Improvement Act, 1854. (Note: Abergavenny Improvement Act 1854 (17 & 18 Vict. c. xlix))	
	Baldock Order 1880 Provisional Order for extending the Local Government District of Baldock.	
	Bredbury Order 1880 Provisional Order for extending the Local Government District of Bredbury, and for other purposes.	
	Bromsgrove Order 1880 Provisional Order for extending the District of Bromsgrove, and for altering and extending the provisions of a Local Act. (Note: Bromsgrove Improvement and Small Tenements Act 1846 (9 & 10 Vict. c. cxxiv))	
	Cuckfield Order 1880 Provisional Order for extending the Local Government District of Cuckfield.	
	Ebbw Vale Order 1880 Provisional Order for altering a Confirming Act. (Note: Local Government Board's Provisional Orders Confirmation (Abingdon, &c.) Act 1875 (38 & 39 Vict. c. clxxvi))	
	Hanley, Stoke and Fenton Order 1880 Provisional Order for forming a United District under Sect. 279 of the Public Health Act, 1875.	
	Heckmondwike Order 1880 Provisional Order to enable the Sanitary Authority for the Urban Sanitary District of Heckmondwike to put in force the Compulsory Clauses of the Lands Clauses Consolidation Acts, 1845, 1860, and 1869.	
	Pembroke Order 1880 Provisional Order for altering the mode of defraying the Expenses of an Urban Sanitary Authority.	
	Swindon New Town Order 1880 Provisional Order for extending the Local Government District of Swindon New Town.	
	Withington Order 1880 Provisional Order to enable the Sanitary Authority for the Urban Sanitary District of Withington to put in force the Compulsory Clauses of the Lands Clauses Consolidation Acts, 1845, 1860, and 1869. 1860, and 1869.	
Local Government Board's Provisional Orders Confirmation (Amersham Union, &c.) Act 1880	43 & 44 Vict. c. lix	19 July 1880
An Act to confirm certain Provisional Orders of the Local Government Board relating to the Rural Sanitary Districts of the Amersham, Ashby-de-la-Zouch, and Basford Unions, the Borough of Chard, the Local Government District of Croydon, the Borough of Cheltenham, the Rural Sanitary District of the Hendon Union, the Local Government Districts of Hornsey and Leyton, the City of Lincoln, the Borough of Plymouth, the Local Government District of Redditch, the Rural Sanitary District of the Shardlow Union, and the Local Board of Health District of Woolwich.
	Amersham Union Order 1880 Provisional Order to enable the Sanitary Authority for the Rural Sanitary District of the Amersham Union to put in force the Compulsory Clauses of the Lands Clauses Consolidation Acts, 1845, 1860, and 1869.	
	Ashby-de-la-Zouch Union Order 1880 Provisional Order to enable the Sanitary Authority for the Rural Sanitary District of the Ashby-de-la-Zouch Union to put in force the Compulsory Clauses of the Lands Clauses Consolidation Acts, 1845, 1860, and 1869.	
	Basford Union Order 1880 Provisional Order to enable the Sanitary Authority for the Rural Sanitary District of the Basford Union to put in force the Compulsory Clauses of the Lands Clauses Consolidation Acts, 1845, 1860, and 1869.	
	Chard Order 1880 Provisional Order to enable the Urban Sanitary Authority for the Borough of Chard to put in force the Compulsory Clauses of the Lands Clauses Consolidation Acts, 1845, 1860, and 1869.	
	Croydon Order 1880 Provisional Order to enable the Urban Sanitary Authority for the District of Croydon to put in force the Compulsory Clauses of the Lands Clauses Consolidation Acts, 1845, 1860, and 1869.	
	Cheltenham Order 1880 Provisional Order to enable the Urban Sanitary Authority for the Borough of Cheltenham to put in force the Compulsory Clauses of the Lands Clauses Consolidation Acts, 1845, 1860, and 1869.	
	Hendon Union Order 1880 Provisional Order to enable the Sanitary Authority for the Rural Sanitary District of the Hendon Union to put in force the Compulsory Clauses of the Lands Clauses Consolidation Acts, 1845, 1860, and 1869.	
	Hornsey Order 1880 Provisional Order to enable the Sanitary Authority for the Urban Sanitary District of Hornsey to put in force the Compulsory Clauses of the Lands Clauses Consolidation Acts, 1845, 1860, and 1869.	
	Leyton Order 1880 Provisional Order to enable the Sanitary Authority for the Urban Sanitary District of Leyton to put in force the Compulsory Clauses of the Lands Clauses Consolidation Acts, 1845, 1860, and 1869.	
	Lincoln Order (1) 1880 Provisional Order to enable the Urban Sanitary Authority for the City of Lincoln to put in force the Compulsory Clauses of the Lands Clauses Consolidation Acts, 1845, 1860, and 1869.	
	Plymouth Order 1880 Provisional Order to enable the Urban Sanitary Authority for the Borough of Plymouth to put in force the Compulsory Clauses of the Lands Clauses Consolidation Acts, 1845, 1860, and 1869.	
	Redditch Order 1880 Provisional Order to enable the Sanitary Authority for the Urban Sanitary District of Redditch to put in force the Compulsory Clauses of the Lands Clauses Consolidation Acts, 1845, 1860, and 1869.	
	Shardlow Union Order 1880 Provisional Order to enable the Sanitary Authority for the Rural Sanitary District of the Shardlow Union to put in force the Compulsory Clauses of the Lands Clauses Consolidation Acts, 1845, 1860, and 1869.	
	Woolwich Order 1880 Provisional Order to enable the Local Board of Health of the Woolwich District to put in force the Compulsory Clauses of the Lands Clauses Consolidation Act, 1845.	
Local Government Board's Provisional Orders Confirmation (Poor Law) Act 1880	43 & 44 Vict. c. lx	19 July 1880
An Act to confirm a Provisional Order of the Local Government Board under the provisions of the Poor Law Amendment Act, 1867, (Note: Poor Law Amendment Act 1867 (30 & 31 Vict. c. 106)) relating to the City of Canterbury, and an Order of the Local Government Board under the provisions of the Divided Parishes and Poor Law Amendment Act, 1876, (Note: Divided Parishes and Poor Law Amendment Act 1876 (39 & 40 Vict. c. 61)) amended and extended by the Poor Law Act, 1879, (Note: Poor Law Act 1879 (42 & 43 Vict. c. 54)) relating to the parishes of Bepton, Chithurst, Farnhurst, Iping, Kirdford, Linch, Linchmere, Lodsworth, Lurgashall, Selham, Stedham, Terwick, Trotton, and Woolbeding, and to the Tything of North Ambersham.
	Canterbury Order (1) 1880 Provisional Order for repealing certain Local Acts. (Note: Canterbury Poor Relief Act 1727 (1 Geo. 2. St. 2. c. 20)) (Note: Canterbury Workhouse Act 1814 (54 Geo. 3. c. cxiv))	
	Bepton, &c. Order 1880 Bepton, &c.	
Gas and Water Orders Confirmation Act 1880	43 & 44 Vict. c. lxi	19 July 1880
An Act for confirming certain Provisional Orders made by the Board of Trade under the Gas and Water Works Facilities Act, 1870, relating to Chew Magna Gas, Garstang Gas, Halstead Gas, Harrogate Gas, Holywell Gas, Long Eaton Gas, Trowbridge Gas, Broadstairs Water, East Blatchington and Seaford Water, Gisborough Water, Harrogate Water, Luton Water, Newhaven and Denton Water, Norwood (Middlesex) Water, and Pwllheli Water.
	Chew Magna Gas Order 1880 Order empowering the Chew Magna Gas and Coal Company (Limited) to maintain and continue Gasworks and to make and supply Gas in the parish of Chew Magna, in the county of Somerset.	
	Garstang Gas Order 1880 Order empowering the Garstang Gas Company (Limited) to construct and maintain Gasworks and to manufacture and supply Gas within certain townships in the parish of Garstang in the county of Lancaster.	
	Halstead Gas Order 1880 Order conferring powers for the maintenance and continuance of Gasworks, and for the manufacture and supply of Gas, in the parish of Halstead, in the county of Esseх.	
	Harrogate Gas Order 1880 Order empowering the Harrogate Gas Company to raise Additional Capital.	
	Holywell Gas Order 1880 Order empowering the British Gas Light Company (Limited) to maintain and continue Gasworks, and to make and supply Gas in certain parts of the parishes of Holywell and Whitford, in the county of Flint.	
	Long Eaton Gas Order 1880 Order empowering the Long Eaton Gas Company (Limited) to maintain and continue Gasworks and to construct additional Gasworks, and to make and supply Gas, in the township of Long Eaton, and in the parishes or townships of Sawley, Little Wilne, Draycott, Breaston, Risley, and Wilsthorpe, all in the county of Derby.	
	Trowbridge Gas Order 1880 Order empowering the British Gas Light Company (Limited) to maintain and continue Gasworks, and to make and supply Gas in the town and parish of Trowbridge, the tything of Studley and Staverton, and the parishes of Hilperton, West Ashton, North Bradley (including Southwick and Yarnbrook), Steeple Ashton, Semington, and Winkfield, all in the county of Wilts.	
	Broadstairs Water Order 1880 Order empowering the Broadstairs Waterworks Company to raise Additional Capital.	
	East Blatchington and Seaford Water Order 1880 Order authorising the construction of Waterworks and the supply of Water in the parishes of East Blatchington and Bishopstone, and the town and parish of Seaford, in the county of Sussex.	
	Gisborough Water Order 1880 Order conferring powers for the construction and maintenance of additional Waterworks within the township of Gisborough in the North Riding of the county of York, and for the raising of Additional Capital for such purposes.	
	Harrogate Water Order 1880 Order defining and extending the limits of supply of the Harrogate Waterworks Company, and empowering them to raise Additional Capital, and to construct and maintain Additional Waterworks.	
	Luton Water Order 1880 Order empowering the Luton Water Company to raise Additional Capital.	
	Newhaven and Denton Water Order 1880 Order authorising the construction of Waterworks, and the supply of Water, in the parishes of Newhaven and Denton, in the county of Sussex.	
	Norwood (Middlesex) Water Order 1880 Order empowering the Norwood (Middlesex) Waterworks Company (Limited) to supply water within the parishes of East Bedfont, Feltham, Hanworth, and Cranford, in the county of Middlesex, and to raise additional capital.	
	Pwllheli Water Order 1880 Order authorising the maintenance and continuance of Waterworks, the construction of additional Waterworks, and the supply of Water in the several parishes and places of Llangybi, Abererch, and Denio, and in the borough of Pwllheli, in the county of Carnarvon.	
Local Government Board's Provisional Orders Confirmation (Ashford, &c.) Act 1880	43 & 44 Vict. c. lxii	19 July 1880
An Act to confirm certain Provisional Orders of the Local Government Board relating to the Local Government District of Ashford, the Improvement Act District of Bournemouth, the Urban Sanitary District of Folkestone, the Local Government Districts of Ilfracombe and Mirfield, the Rural Sanitary District of the Reigate Union, and the Port of Wisbech.
	Ashford Order 1880 Provisional Order to enable the Sanitary Authority for the Urban Sanitary District of Ashford to put in force the Compulsory Clauses of the Lands Clauses Consolidation Acts, 1845, 1860, and 1869.	
	Bournemouth Order 1880 Provisional Order to enable the Sanitary Authority for the Urban Sanitary District of Bournemouth to put in force the Compulsory Clauses of the Lands Clauses Consolidation Acts, 1845, 1860, and 1869.	
	Folkestone Order 1880 Provisional Order to enable the Sanitary Authority for the Urban Sanitary District of Folkestone to put in force the Compulsory Clauses of the Lands Clauses Consolidation Acts, 1845, 1860, and 1869.	
	Ilfracombe Order 1880 Provisional Order to enable the Sanitary Authority for the Urban Sanitary District of Ilfracombe to put in force the Compulsory Clauses of the Lands Clauses Consolidation Acts, 1845, 1860, and 1869.	
	Mirfield Order 1880 Provisional Order to enable the Sanitary Authority for the Urban Sanitary District of Mirfield to put in force the Compulsory Clauses of the Lands Clauses Consolidation Acts, 1845, 1860, and 1869.	
	Reigate Union Order 1880 Provisional Order to enable the Sanitary Authority for the Rural Sanitary District of the Reigate Union to put in force the Compulsory Clauses of the Lands Clauses Consolidation Acts, 1845, 1860, and 1869.	
	Wisbech Order 1880 Provisional Order to enable the Port Sanitary Authority for the Port of Wisbech to put in force the Compulsory Clauses of the Lands Clauses Consolidation Acts, 1845, 1860, and 1869.	
Local Government Board (Ireland) Provisional Orders Confirmation (Dublin, &c.) Act 1880	43 & 44 Vict. c. lxiii	19 July 1880
An Act to confirm certain Provisional Orders of the Local Government Board for Ireland relating to a new Street in Dublin, and to Waterworks in the town of Fermoy.
	Dublin (New Street) Provisional Order 1880 City of Dublin. Provisional Order.	
	Femoy Waterworks Provisional Order 1880 Femoy Waterworks. Provisional Order.	
Regulation (Abbotside) Provisional Order Confirmation Act 1880	43 & 44 Vict. c. lxiv	19 July 1880
An Act to confirm the Provisional Order for the Regulation of certain Lands known as Abbotside Common, situate in the parish of Aysgarth, in the county of York, in pursuance of a report of the Inclosure Commissioners for England and Wales.
	Abbotside Common Order 1880 Provisional Order for the Regulation of a Common.	
Manchester and Milford Railway (Devil's Bridge Branch Abandonment) Act 1880 (repealed)	43 & 44 Vict. c. lxv	19 July 1880
An Act to authorise the Manchester and Milford Railway Company to abandon the Branch Railway to Devil's Bridge; and for other purposes. (Repealed by Statute Law (Repeals) Act 2013 (c. 2))
Exmouth and District Water Act 1880	43 & 44 Vict. c. lxvi	19 July 1880
An Act for conferring further powers upon the Exmouth and Budleigh Salterton Waterworks Company; for the raising of further capital; and for other purposes.
Malton Gas Act 1880	43 & 44 Vict. c. lxvii	19 July 1880
An Act for incorporating and conferring Powers on the Malton Gas Company.
Caledonian Insurance Company's Act 1880 (repealed)	43 & 44 Vict. c. lxviii	19 July 1880
An Act to amend, vary, and extend the Powers of the Caledonian Insurance Company, and for other purposes relating thereto. (Repealed by Caledonian Insurance Company's Act 1923 (13 & 14 Geo. 5. c. xxix))
London, Tilbury and Southend Railway (Further Powers) Act 1880	43 & 44 Vict. c. lxix	19 July 1880
An Act to enable the London, Tilbury, and Southend Railway Company to improve and extend the West Street Pier at Gravesend, and to construct a Wharf at Thames Haven.
Wrexham Waterworks Act 1880	43 & 44 Vict. c. lxx	19 July 1880
An Act to authorise the Wrexham Waterworks Company to make new Service Reservoirs and Filter Beds; to further extend their Limits of Supply; to raise additional Capital; and for other purposes.
London, Brighton and South Coast Railway Act 1880	43 & 44 Vict. c. lxxi	19 July 1880
An Act to confer further Powers upon the London, Brighton, and South Coast Railway Company.
Wandsworth and Putney Gas Act 1880 (repealed)	43 & 44 Vict. c. lxxii	19 July 1880
An Act to authorise the Wandsworth and Putney Gaslight and Coke Company to raise further Capital; and for other purposes. (Repealed by Wandsworth, Wimbledon and Epsom District Gas Act 1912 (2 & 3 Geo. 5. c. xlvii))
Stafford Corporation Act 1880	43 & 44 Vict. c. lxxiii	19 July 1880
An Act for empowering the Corporation of the Borough of Stafford to acquire certain rights in Coton Field in the said borough, and to authorise the formation of allotment gardens for the Freemen of the borough, and of public pleasure grounds in Coton Field, and for conferring on the Corporation further powers in relation to their water undertaking and street improvements, and further sanitary and other powers; and for other purposes.
Mersey Railway Act 1880	43 & 44 Vict. c. lxxiv	19 July 1880
An Act for extending the time for making and completing the Mersey Railway.
Belfast Street Tramways Act 1880	43 & 44 Vict. c. lxxv	19 July 1880
An Act to extend the period for the completion of the works authorised by the Belfast Street Tramways Act, 1878. (Note: Belfast Street Tramways Act 1878 (41 & 42 Vict. c. ccxxxv))
Lincoln Gaslight and Coke Company's Act 1880	43 & 44 Vict. c. lxxvi	19 July 1880
An Act to enable the Lincoln Gaslight and Coke Company to raise additional capital; and for other purposes.
Lancaster Corporation Act 1880	43 & 44 Vict. c. lxxvii	19 July 1880
An Act to give effect to an agreement for the transfer to the Corporation of Lancaster of the Lancaster Gas Company's Undertaking, and to authorise the Corporation to make Street Improvements, and to borrow Moneys; and for other purposes.
Pegwell Bay Reclamation and Sandwich Haven Improvement Act 1880	43 & 44 Vict. c. lxxviii	19 July 1880
An Act to amend the Pegwell Bay Reclamation and Sandwich Haven Improvement Act, 1873, (Note: Pegwell Bay Reclamation and Sandwich Haven Improvement Act 1873 (36 & 37 Vict. c. ccxix)) and the Acts amending the same.
Bristol Cemetery Act 1880	43 & 44 Vict. c. lxxix	19 July 1880
An Act to enable the Bristol General Cemetery Company to enlarge their Cemetery, to raise additional Capital; and for other purposes.
Kensington Improvements Act 1880 (repealed)	43 & 44 Vict. c. lxxx	19 July 1880
An Act for authorising Improvements in the Parishes of Saint Mary Abbotts Kensington, and Saint Luke Chelsea; and for other purposes. (Repealed by London Government (Borough of Kensington) Order in Council 1901 (SR&O 1901/271))
Regulation (Clent) Provisional Order Confirmation Act 1880	43 & 44 Vict. c. lxxxi	2 August 1880
An Act to confirm the Provisional Order for the Regulation of certain Lands known as Clent Hill Common, situate in the parish of Clent, in the county of Worcester, in pursuance of a report of the Inclosure Commissioners for England and Wales.
	Clent Common Order 1880 Provisional Order for the Regulation of a Common.	
Land Drainage Supplemental Act 1880 (repealed)	43 & 44 Vict. c. lxxxii	2 August 1880
An Act to confirm a Provisional Order under the Land Drainage Act, 1861, (Note: Land Drainage Act 1861 (24 & 25 Vict. c. 133)) relating to Frodsham and Helsby Improvements, situated in the parish of Frodsham, in the county of Chester. (Repealed by Statute Law (Repeals) Act 1993 (c. 50))
	In the matter of Frodsham and Helsby Improvements, situate in the townships of Frodsham, Frodsham Lordship, and Helsby, in the parish of Frodsham, in the county of Chester.	
Local Government Board's Provisional Orders Confirmation (Alnwick Union, &c.) Act 1880	43 & 44 Vict. c. lxxxiii	2 August 1880
An Act to confirm certain Provisional Orders of the Local Government Board relating to the Rural Sanitary District of the Alnwick Union, the Borough of Barnsley (two), the Local Government District of Brentford, the Rural Sanitary District of the Durham Union, the Local Government Districts of Ealing, East Dereham, and Mountain Ash (two), the Boroughs of Newcastle-under-Lyme and Penzance, the Rural Sanitary Districts of the Rothbury and Settle Unions, and the Local Government District of Torquay.
	Alnwick Union Order 1880 Provisional Order to enable the Sanitary Authority for the Rural Sanitary District of the Almwich Union to put in force the Compulsory Clauses of the Lands Clauses Consolidation Acts, 1845, 1860, and 1869.	
	Barnsley Order (1) 1880 Provisiomal Order to enable the Urban Sanitary Authority for the Borough of Barnsley to put in force the Compulsory Clauses of the Lands Clauses Consolidation Acts, 1845, 1860, and 1869.	
	Barnsley Order (2) 1880 Provisional Order for altering certain Local Acts. (Note: Barnsley Local Board Act 1862 (25 & 26 Vict. c. xxxii)) (Note: Barnsley Local Board Amendment Act 1866 (29 & 30 Vict. c. xcviii))	
	Brentford Order 1880 Provisional Order to enable the Sanitary Authority for the Urban Sanitary District of Brentford to put in force the Compulsory Clauses of the Lands Clauses Consolidation Acts, 1845, 1860, and 1869.	
	Durham Union Order 1880 Provisional Order to enable the Sanitary Authority for the Rural Sanitary District of the Durham Union to put in force the Compulsory Clauses of the Lands Clauses Consolidation Acts, 1845, 1860, and 1869.	
	Ealing Order 1880 Provisional Order to enable the Sanitary Authority for the Urban Sanitary District of Ealing to put in force the Compulsory Clauses of the Lands Clauses Consolidation Acts, 1845, 1860, and 1869.	
	East Dereham Order 1880 Provisional Order to enable the Sanitary Authority for the Urban Sanitary District of East Dereham to put in force the Compulsory Clauses of the Lands Clauses Consolidation Acts, 1845, 1860, and 1869.	
	Mountain Ash Order (1) 1880 Provisional Order for extending the Local Government District of Mountain Ash.	
	Mountain Ash Order (2) 1880 Pronisional Order to enable the Sanitary Authority for the Urban Sanitary District of Mountain Ash to put in force the Compulsory Clauses of the Lands Clauses Consolidation Acts, 1845, 1860, and 1869.	
	Newcastle-under-Lyme Order 1880 Provisional Order to enable the Urban Sanitary Authority for the Borough of Newcastle-under-Lyme to put in force the Compulsory Clauses of the Lands Clauses Consolidation Acts, 1845, 1860, and 1869.	
	Penzance Order 1880 Provisional Order to enable the Urban Sanitary Authority for the Borough of Penzance to put in force the Compulsory Clauses of the Lands Clauses Consolidation Acts, 1845, 1860, and 1869.	
	Rothbury Union Order 1880 Provisional Order to enable the Sanitary Authority for the Rural Sanitary District of the Rothbury Union to put in force the Compulsory Clauses of the Lands Clauses Consolidation Acts, 1845, 1860, and 1869.	
	Settle Union Order 1880 Provisional Order to enable the Sanitary Authority for the Rural Sanitary District of the Settle Union to put in force the Compulsory Clauses of the Lands Clauses Consolidation Acts, 1845, 1860, and 1869.	
	Torquay Order 1880 Provisional Order to cnable the Urban Sanitary Authority for the District of Torquay to put in force the Compulsory Clauses of the Lands Clauses Consolidation Acts, 1845, 1860, and 1869.	
Local Government Board's Provisional Orders Confirmation (Kingston-upon-Hull, &c.) Act 1880	43 & 44 Vict. c. lxxxiv	2 August 1880
An Act to confirm certain Provisional Orders of the Local Government Board relating to the Borough of Kingston-upon-Hull, and the Improvement Act District of Ramsgate.
	Kingston-upon-Hull Order 1880 Provisional Order for partially repealing, altering, and amending a Confirming Act. (Note: Local Government Supplemental Act 1872 (35 & 36 Vict. c. xlv))	
	Ramsgate Order 1880 Provisional Order for partially repealing and altering certain Local Acts and Confirmation Acts relating to the Improvement Act District of Ramsgate.	
Pier and Harbour Orders Confirmation Act 1880	43 & 44 Vict. c. lxxxv	2 August 1880
An Act to confirm certain Provisional Orders made by the Board of Trade under the General Pier and Harbour Act, 1861, (Note: General Pier and Harbour Act 1861 (24 & 25 Vict. c. 45)) relating to Aldrington, Anstruther, Bouldnor, Broadstairs, Carrickfergus, Castle Bay (Barra), Llandudno, and Tralee and Fenit; and to amend the Cattewater Harbour Order, 1876.
	Aldrington Pier Order 1880 Order for the construction, maintenance, and regulation of a Pier and other works at Aldrington, in the county of Sussex.	
	Anstruther Union Harbour Order 1880 Order for amending the Anstruther Union Harbour Act, 1860, (Note: Anstruther Union Harbour Act 1860 (23 & 24 Vict. c. 39)) and conferring further Powers on the Commissioners of that Harbour.	
	Bouldnor Pier Order 1880 Order for the revival of the Bouldnor Pier Order, 1873.	
	Broadstairs Pier Order 1880 Order for the construction, maintenance, and regulation of a Pier at Broadstairs, in the Isle of Thanet, in the county of Kent.	
	Carrickfergus Harbour Order 1880 Order for the Revival of Powers and Extension of Time for Construction of Works authorised by the Carrickfergus Harbour Order, 1875.	
	Castle Bay Pier Order 1880 Order for the construction, maintenance, and regulation of a Pier and works at Castle Bay in the parish, of Barra and county of Inverness.	
	Llandudno Pier Order 1880 Order for the enlargement, maintenance, and regulation of the Pier and works at Llandudno in the County of Carnarvon.	
	Tralee and Fenit Pier and Harbour Order 1880 Order for the construction and maintenance of a Pier and Harbour at Fenit, in the county of Kerr.	
Local Government Board's Provisional Orders Confirmation (Aberavon, &c.) Act 1880	43 & 44 Vict. c. lxxxvi	2 August 1880
An Act to confirm certain Provisional Orders of the Local Government Board relating to the Borough of Aberavon, the Local Government District of Ashton-in-Makerfield, the City of Canterbury, the Local Government District of Cleator Moor, the Borough of Congleton, the Local Government District of Horncastle, the City of Lincoln, the Local Government District of Littlehampton, the Improvement Act District of Llandudno, the Local Government Districts of Ossett-cum-Gawthorpe and Oswaldtwistle, the City of Saint Alban (two), and the Borough of Sunderland.
	Aberavon Order 1880 Provisional Order for altering the Aberavon Local Board Act, 1866. (Note: Aberavon Local Board Act 1866 (29 & 30 Vict. c. ccxl))	
	Ashton-in-Makerfield Order 1880 Provisional Order for altering the Ashton-in-Makerfield Local Board Act, 1875. (Note: Ashton-in-Makerfield Local Board Act 1875 (38 & 39 Vict. c. xxxviii))	
	Canterbury Order (2) 1880 Provisional Order for partially repealing and altering a Local Act. (Note: Canterbury Market Act 1824 (5 Geo. 4. c. cxxxiv))	
	Cleator Moor Order 1880 Provisional Order for extending the Local Government District of Cleator Moor, and for other purposes.	
	Congleton Order 1880 Provisional Order for altering the mode of defraying the Expenses of an Urban Sanitary Authority.	
	Horncastle Order 1880 Provisional Order for altering and amending the Horncastle Gas Act, 1876. (Note: Horncastle Gas Act 1876 (39 & 40 Vict. c. cxxxii))	
	Lincoln Order (2) 1880 Provisional Order for altering the Lincoln Waterworks Act, 1871. (Note: Lincoln Waterworks Act 1871 (34 & 35 Vict. c. cxlix))	
	Littlehampton Order 1880 Provisional Order for diminishing the Local Government District of Littlehampton.	
	Llandudno Order 1880 Provisional Order for partially repealing and altering the Llandudno Improvement Act, 1854. (Note: Llandudno Improvement Act 1854 (17 & 18 Vict. c. cii))	
	Ossett-cum-Gawthorpe Order 1880 Provisional Order for altering the Ossett-cum-Gawthorpe Local Board Act, 1875. (Note: Ossett-cum-Gawthorpe Local Board Act 1875 (38 & 39 Vict. c. lxix))	
	Oswaldtwistle Order 1880 Provisional Order for altering and amending the Oswaldtwistle Local Board Act, 1869. (Note: Oswaldtwistle Local Board Act 1869 (32 & 33 Vict. c. lxvi))	
	Saint Alban Order (1) 1880 Provisional Order to enable the Urban Sanitary Authority for the City of Saint Alban to put in force the Compulsory Clauses of the Lands Clauses Consolidation Acts, 1845, 1860, and 1869.	
	Saint Alban Order (2) 1880 Provisional Order for altering the Saint Alban City Improvement Act, 1879. (Note: St. Alban City Improvement Act 1879 (42 & 43 Vict. c. xcviii))	
	Sunderland Order 1880 Provisional Order for partially repealing and altering certain Local Acts (Note: Borough of Sunderland Act 1851 (14 & 15 Vict. c. lxvii)) (Note: Sunderland Corporation Act 1865 (28 & 29 Vict. c. lxx)) and a Confirming Act. (Note: Local Government Act 1868 (No. 2) (31 & 32 Vict. c. lxxxiv))	
Inclosure (Hendy Bank) Provisional Order Confirmation Act 1880	43 & 44 Vict. c. lxxxvii	2 August 1880
An Act to confirm the Provisional Order for the inclosure of certain lands known as Hendy Bank Common, situate in the parish of Cefullys in the county of Radnor, in pursuance of a Report of the Inclosure Commissioners for England and Wales.
	Hendy Bank Order 1880 Provisional Order for the Inclosure of a Common.	
Inclosure (Steventon) Provisional Order Confirmation Act 1880	43 & 44 Vict. c. lxxxviii	2 August 1880
An Act to confirm the Provisional Order for the inclosure of certain Lands known as the Common Fields, the Common Meadow Lands, the Cow Common, the Green, the Meres, Baulks, and other waste lands, situate in the parish of Steventon, in the county of Berks, in pursuance of a Report of the Inclosure Commissioners for England and Wales.
	Steventon Order 1880 Provisional Order for the Inclosure of a Common.	
Inclosure (Llandegley Rhos) Provisional Order Confirmation Act 1880	43 & 44 Vict. c. lxxxix	2 August 1880
An Act to confirm the Provisional Order for the inclosure of certain Lands known as Llandegley Rhos Common, situate in the parish of Glascwm, in the county of Radnor, in pursuance of a Report of the Inclosure Commissioners for England and Wales.
	Llandegley Rhos Order 1880 Provisional Order for the Inclosure of a Common.	
Inclosure and Regulation (Lizard Common) Provisional Orders Confirmation Act 1880	43 & 44 Vict. c. xc	2 August 1880
An Act to confirm the Provisional Orders for the regulation of certain Lands forming part of the Lizard Common, and situated in the parish of Landewednack, in the county of Cornwall, and the Provisional Orders for the inclosure of certain other Lands forming the remainder of the said common, and situated in the same parish, in pursuance of a Report of the Inclosure Commissioners for England and Wales.
	Lizard Common Regulation Order 1880 Provisional Order for the Regulation of a Common.	
	Lizard Common Inclosure Order 1880 Provisional Order for the Inclosure of a Common.	
Lanark Water Supply Confirmation Act 1880	43 & 44 Vict. c. xci	2 August 1880
An Act to confirm a Provisional Order made under the Public Health (Scotland) Act, 1867, (Note: Public Health (Scotland) Act 1867 (30 & 31 Vict. c. 101)) relating to the Borough of Lanark.
	Lanark Order 1880 Burgh of Lanark Water. Provisional Order. Public Health (Scotland) Act, 1867.	
Blantyre Water Supply Confirmation Act 1880	43 & 44 Vict. c. xcii	2 August 1880
An Act to confirm a Provisional Order made under the Public Health (Scotland) Act, 1867, relating to the Parish of Blantyre.
	Blantyre Order 1880 Blantyre. Public Health (Scotland) Act, 1867. (30 & 31 Vict., cap. 101.) Provisional Order.	
Local Government Board's Provisional Order Confirmation (Poor Law, No. 2) Act 1880	43 & 44 Vict. c. xciii	2 August 1880
An Act to confirm an Order of the Local Government Board under the provisions of the Divided Parishes and Poor Law Amendment Act, 1876, as amended and extended by the Poor Law Act, 1879, relating to the Parishes of Bowers Gifford, Hadleigh, Laindon, Leigh, North Benfleet, Pitsea, Prittlewell, South Benfleet, Southchurch, and Vange.
	Canvey Island Order 1880 Canvey Island Order.	
South Western (of London) District Post Office Act 1880 (repealed)	43 & 44 Vict. c. xciv	2 August 1880
An Act to enable Her Majesty's Postmaster-General to enlarge and acquire a site for the South-western (of London) District Post Office. (Repealed by Post Office Act 1969 (c. 48))
Cork Improvement Act 1880	43 & 44 Vict. c. xcv	2 August 1880
An Act to enable the Mayor, Aldermen, and Burgesses of the Borough of Cork to make better Regulations with reference to Street Traffic and Streets, to confer further powers on the Corporation with reference to Water Supply, to fund the Corporate Debt; and for other purposes.
London Gaslight Act 1880 (repealed)	43 & 44 Vict. c. xcvi	2 August 1880
An Act to confer further Powers upon the London Gaslight Company; and for other purposes. (Repealed by Statute Law (Repeals) Act 2013 (c. 2))
North Metropolitan Tramways Act 1880	43 & 44 Vict. c. xcvii	2 August 1880
An Act for empowering the North Metropolitan Tramways Company to construct Works and raise further Money, and to make Agreements with the London Street Tramways Company; and for other purposes.
Kent and Sussex Rother Levels Act 1880	43 & 44 Vict. c. xcviii	2 August 1880
An Act for the improvement of the Drainage of the Upper and Wittersham Levels, otherwise the Kent and Sussex Rother Levels; and for other purposes.
Huddersfield Improvement Act 1880	43 & 44 Vict. c. xcix	2 August 1880
An Act to enable the Mayor, Aldermen, and Burgesses of the borough of Huddersfield to construct Tramways, New Streets, Roads, and Street and Road Improvements, and other Works; and to make further provision for the good government of the borough; and for other purposes.
Portmadoc Water Act 1880	43 & 44 Vict. c. c	2 August 1880
An Act to repeal the Portmadoc Water Order, 1871; to incorporate a Company, and to vest in such Company the undertaking authorised by the said Order, and to grant powers to such Company for the construction of additional Waterworks, and for the supply of water to Portmadoc and the neighbourhood thereof and for other purposes.
Northampton Street Tramways Act 1880 (repealed)	43 & 44 Vict. c. ci	2 August 1880
An Act to authorise the construction of Tramways in the Borough of Northampton and adjacent places; and for other purposes. (Repealed by Northampton Act 1988 (c. xxix))
Yeadon and Guiseley Gas Act 1880	43 & 44 Vict. c. cii	2 August 1880
An Act to confer further powers upon the Yeadon and Guiseley Gaslight and Coke Company and to enable them to raise further money; and for other purposes.
Great Yarmouth Waterworks Act 1880	43 & 44 Vict. c. ciii	2 August 1880
An Act to extend the limits of the Great Yarmouth Waterworks Company, and to authorise the said Company to construct new works and raise more money; and for other purposes.
Devon and Cornwall Railway Act 1880	43 & 44 Vict. c. civ	2 August 1880
An Act for providing for the return of the Money deposited for securing the Completion of the Railways authorised by the Devon and Cornwall Railway (Western Extensions) Act, 1873. (Note: Devon and Cornwall Railway (Western Extensions) Act 1873 (36 & 37 Vict. c. cxii))
Ballymena, Cushendall and Redbay Railway Act 1880	43 & 44 Vict. c. cv	2 August 1880
An Act to authorise the Ballymena, Cushendall, and Redbay Railway Company to apply to the purposes of the Ballymena, Cushendall, and Redbay Railway Act, 1872, (Note: Ballymena, Cushendall, and Redbay Railway Act 1872 (35 & 36 Vict. c. lxxxv)) a sum of twenty-two thousand pounds which they are authorised to raise under the Powers of the Ballymena, Cushendall, and Redbay Railway Act, 1878, (Note: Ballymena, Cushendall, and Redbay Railway Act 1878 (41 & 42 Vict. c. cxvii)) and which is not required for the purposes of that Act.
Metropolitan District Railway Act 1880	43 & 44 Vict. c. cvi	2 August 1880
An Act to confer further powers on the Metropolitan District Railway Company.
Romford Canal Act 1880	43 & 44 Vict. c. cvii	2 August 1880
An Act for the revival of the powers and extension of the time for the compulsory purchase of lands and completion of the works authorised by the Romford Canal Act, 1875. (Note: Romford Canal Act 1875 (38 & 39 Vict. c. clv))
Rathmines and Rathgar (Milltown Extension) Act 1880	43 & 44 Vict. c. cviii	2 August 1880
An Act for extending the Rathmines and Rathgar township, so as to include therein the adjoining townland of Milltown, in the county of Dublin; for the establishment of a Fire Brigade; and for other purposes.
Sligo Borough Improvement (Revival of Powers) Act 1880	43 & 44 Vict. c. cix	2 August 1880
An Act to revive the powers and extend the periods respectively limited for the Construction of Waterworks and Supply of Water and the Purchase of Market Rights authorised by the Sligo Borough Improvement Act, 1869; (Note: Sligo Borough Improvement Act 1869 (32 & 33 Vict. c. cxlvii)) and for other purposes.
Great Western and Monmouthshire Railways Amalgamation Act 1880	43 & 44 Vict. c. cx	2 August 1880
An Act for amalgamating the Monmouthshire Railway and Canal Company with the Great Western Railway Company.
Hunt's Patent Act 1880	43 & 44 Vict. c. cxi	2 August 1880
An Act for rendering valid certain Letters Patent granted to Bristow Hunt for the Invention of improved Machinery or Apparatus for setting and distributing Types.
Manchester Carriage and Tramways Company Act 1880	43 & 44 Vict. c. cxii	2 August 1880
An Act for dissolving the Manchester Carriage Company, Limited, and re-incorporating the Members thereof as a new Company, and for transferring to such new Company the powers conferred by the Manchester Suburban Tramways Acts, 1878 (Note: Manchester Suburban Tramways Act 1878 (41 & 42 Vict. c. cxli)) and 1879, (Note: Manchester Suburban Tramways Act 1879 (42 & 43 Vict. c. cxc)) and the Manchester Suburban Tramways Orders, 1877 and 1878; and for conferring further powers for the construction of new and the completion of authorised Tramways; and for other purposes.
Ackworth, Featherstone, Purston and Sharlston Gas Act 1880	43 & 44 Vict. c. cxiii	2 August 1880
An Act for incorporating and conferring powers on the Ackworth, Featherstone, Purston, and Sharlston Gas Company.
Maidstone Gas Act 1880	43 & 44 Vict. c. cxiv	2 August 1880
An Act to enable the Maidstone Gas Company to construct additional Works; to raise further Capital; and for other purposes.
Reading Gas Act 1880	43 & 44 Vict. c. cxv	2 August 1880
An Act for enabling the Reading Gas Company to raise additional Capital and to construct new Works; and for other purposes.
Dearne Valley Waterworks Act 1880	43 & 44 Vict. c. cxvi	2 August 1880
An Act to incorporate a Company for making Works and supplying Water within certain parishes and townships in the Valley of the Dearne; and for other purposes.
Hundred of Hoo Railway (Extension) Act 1880	43 & 44 Vict. c. cxvii	2 August 1880
An Act to authorise the Hundred of Hoo Railway Company to extend their Railway by the making of a further Line of Railway, and also a jetty, pier, or landing-place, in the county of Kent, to raise further Money; and for other purposes.
Preston Improvement Act 1880	43 & 44 Vict. c. cxviii	2 August 1880
An Act to extend the Borough of Preston and to enable the Mayor, Aldermen, and Burgesses thereof to provide a Site for a Public Library and Museum, to make new Streets, Street Improvements, Tramways, and other works; and to make further provision for the Improvement and good Government of the Borough; and for other purposes.
Rochester City Improvement Act 1880	43 & 44 Vict. c. cxix	2 August 1880
An Act for empowering the Corporation of the City of Rochester to acquire the undertaking of the Strood Waterworks Company, and carry on the same; to construct additional Waterworks and supply Water; to construct Embankment and Sewerage Works; and for other purposes.
British Gaslight Company (Staffordshire Potteries) Act 1880 (repealed)	43 & 44 Vict. c. cxx	2 August 1880
An Act for empowering the British Gaslight Company, Limited, to enlarge their works and to expend further capital at their Staffordshire Potteries Station; and for other purposes. (Repealed by Stoke-on-Trent (Gas Consolidation) Act 1922 (12 & 13 Geo. 5. c. xxii))
Williamson's Patent Act 1880	43 & 44 Vict. c. cxxi	2 August 1880
An Act for rendering valid certain Letters Patent granted to William Shepherd Williamson, of Congleton in the County of Chester, for the Invention of Improvements in Blast Furnaces.
Dartford Gas Act 1880 (repealed)	43 & 44 Vict. c. cxxii	2 August 1880
An Act to authorise the Dartford Gas Company to purchase additional lands, to raise additional capital, to amalgamate with the Darenth Vale Gas Company, to extend the limits of supply; and for other purposes. (Repealed by South Suburban Gas Act 1928 (18 & 19 Geo. 5. c. lxxx))
Caledonian Railway (Guaranteed Annuities Stock) Act 1880	43 & 44 Vict. c. cxxiii	2 August 1880
An Act to provide for the dissolution of the Glasgow, Garnkirk, and Coatbridge Railway Company, the Clydesdale Railway Guaranteed Company, the Greenock Railway Guaranteed Company, the Wishaw Railway Guaranteed Company, and the Glasgow, Barrhead, and Neilston Direct Railway Company, and for the conversion of the stocks of those Companies into annuities stock of the Caledonian Railway Company; and for other purposes.
Bristol Channel Pilotage (Cardiff) Act 1880	43 & 44 Vict. c. cxxiv	2 August 1880
An Act to amend the Bristol Channel Pilotage Act, 1861, (Note: Bristol Channel Pilotage Act 1861 (24 & 25 Vict. c. ccxxxvi)) so far as relates to the Cardiff Pilotage Board; and for other purposes.
Hull (Corporation) Electric Lighting Act 1880	43 & 44 Vict. c. cxxv	2 August 1880
An Act to make further provision for the lighting of the Borough of Kingston-upon-Hull, and to extend the powers of the Mayor, Aldermen, and Burgesses of the Borough in relation to the supply of light by electricity; and for other purposes.
Liverpool Tramways Act 1880 (repealed)	43 & 44 Vict. c. cxxvi	2 August 1880
An Act for carrying into effect an Agreement for the transfer by the Liverpool United Tramways and Omnibus Company of their Tramways in the City of Liverpool to the Corporation of Liverpool, and for the Lease of those Tramways to the Company; and for other purposes. (Repealed by Liverpool Corporation Act 1921 (11 & 12 Geo. 5. c. lxxiv))
Wigan Improvement Act 1880	43 & 44 Vict. c. cxxvii	2 August 1880
An Act for empowering the Mayor, Aldermen, and Burgesses of the borough of Wigan in the county of Lancaster to make New Streets, and Improvement of Streets; and for conferring on them further Borrowing Powers and other powers; and for other purposes.
Beverley and Barmston Drainage Act 1880	43 & 44 Vict. c. cxxviii	2 August 1880
An Act for making better provision for the Drainage of the Low Grounds and Carrs (known as the Beverley and Barmston Drainage District) in the East Riding of the County of York, and for amending the Acts relating thereto; and for other purposes.
Highland and Dingwall and Skye Railways Amalgamation Act 1880	43 & 44 Vict. c. cxxix	2 August 1880
An Act to amalgamate the Undertakings of the Highland and Dingwall and Skye Railway Companies; and for other purposes.
Epping Forest Act 1880	43 & 44 Vict. c. cxxx	6 August 1880
An Act to continue for a limited period the powers of the Arbitrator under the Epping Forest Act, 1878, (Note: Epping Forest Act 1878 (41 & 42 Vict. c. ccxiii)) and to amend that Act.
Metropolis Improvement Schemes Modification Act 1880	43 & 44 Vict. c. cxxxi	6 August 1880
An Act to confirm the Provisional Order of one of Her Majesty's Principal Secretaries of State for the modification of the Metropolis (High Street, Islington) Improvement Scheme.
	Provisional Order in modification of The Metropolis (High Street, Islington,) Improvement Scheme, 1877.	
Local Government Board's Provisional Orders Confirmation (Eastbourne, &c.) Act 1880	43 & 44 Vict. c. cxxxii	6 August 1880
An Act to confirm certain Provisional Orders of the Local Government Board relating to the Local Government District of Eastbourne, the Improvement Act District of Herne Bay, the Local Government Districts of Northwich and Pudsey, the Improvement Act District of Ramsgate, and the Local Government District of West Ham.
	Eastbourne Order 1880 Provisional Order for extending the Local Government District of Eastbourne, and the provisions of a Local Act. (Note: Eastbourne Improvement Act 1879 (42 & 43 Vict. c. xcvii))	
	Herne Bay Order 1880 Provisional Order for repealing a Local Act, (Note: Herne Parish Improvement Act 1833 (3 & 4 Will. 4. c. cv)) and for constituting a Local Government District.	
	Northwich Order 1880 Provisional Order for extending the Local Government District of Northwich, and for altering a Confirming Act. (Note: Local Government Board's Provisional Orders Confirmation Act 1875 (No. 3) (38 & 39 Vict. c. lxxvi))	
	Pudsey Order 1880 Provisinal Order to enable the Urban Sanitary Authority for the District of Pudsey to put in force the Compulsory Clauses of the Lands Clauses Consolidation Acts, 1845, 1860, and 1869.	
	Ramsgate Order 1880 Provisional Order for partially repealing and altering certain Local Acts (Note: Ramsgate Improvement Act 1838 (1 & 2 Vict. c. lxx)) (Note: Ramsgate Local Board Act 1877 (40 & 41 Vict. c. cxix)) (Note: Ramsgate Improvement Act 1878 (41 & 42 Vict. c. cxciii)) and Confirmation Acts (Note: Local Government Supplemental Act 1865 (No. 5) (28 & 29 Vict. c. 108)) (Note: Local Government Supplemental Act 1866 (No. 4) (29 & 30 Vict. c. 107)) (Note: Local Government Supplemental Act 1867 (No. 5) (30 & 31 Vict. c. 83)) (Note: Local Government Supplemental Act 1871 (No. 4) (34 & 35 Vict. c. clxxxvii)) (Note: Local Government Board's Provisional Orders Confirmation (Bingley, &c.) Act 1876 (39 & 40 Vict. c. cxcviii)) (Note: Local Government Board's Provisional Orders Confirmation (Aspull, &c.) Act 1879 (42 & 43 Vict. c. cv)) relating to the Improvement Act District of Ramsgate.	
	West Ham Order 1880 Provisional Order to enable the Sanitary Authority for the Urban Sanitary District of West Ham to put in force the Compulsory Clauses of the Lands Clauses Consolidation Acts, 1845, 1860, and 1869.	
Inclosure (Llanfair Hills) Provisional Order Confirmation Act 1880	43 & 44 Vict. c. cxxxiii	6 August 1880
An Act to confirm the Provisional Order for the Inclosure of certain Lands known as Llanfair Hills, situate in the parish of Llanfair Waterdine, in the county of Salop, in pursuance of a report of the Inclosure Commissioners for England and Wales.
	Llanfair Hills Common Order 1880 Provisional Order for the Inclosure of a Common.	
Rickmansworth Extension Railway Act 1880	43 & 44 Vict. c. cxxxiv	6 August 1880
An Act to authorise the Metropolitan Railway Company to make a railway in extension of the Kingsbury and Harrow Railway to the town of Rickmansworth; and for other purposes.
North British and Yoker Railways Act 1880	43 & 44 Vict. c. cxxxv	6 August 1880
An Act to confirm an agreement between the Glasgow, Yoker, and Clydebank, and North British Railway Companies; and for other purposes.
East Norfolk Railway Act 1880	43 & 44 Vict. c. cxxxvi	6 August 1880
An Act to vary the mode of dealing with certain roads crossed by the authorised railways of the East Norfolk Railway Company, and to confer certain powers on the Great Eastern Railway Company with reference to the Western Extensions Capital of the East Norfolk Railway Company; and for other purposes.
Clyde Lighthouses Act 1880 (repealed)	43 & 44 Vict. c. cxxxvii	6 August 1880
An Act to amend the Acts relating to the Clyde Lighthouses, and to provide for the improvement of the Navigation of the River Clyde below Newark Castle, Port Glasgow. (Repealed by Clyde Lighthouses Consolidation Order Confirmation Act 1940 (3 & 4 Geo. 6. c. xlii))
Rathmines and Rathgar Water Act 1880	43 & 44 Vict. c. cxxxviii	6 August 1880
An Act to enable the Rathmines and Rathgar Improvement Commissioners to improve the Water Supply of the Rathmines and Rathgar township; and for other purposes.
Burton-upon-Trent Corporation Act 1880	43 & 44 Vict. c. cxxxix	6 August 1880
An Act to confer powers upon the Corporation of Burton-upon-Trent with reference to Bridges over the River Trent at Stapenhill; to enable them to purchase Lands and construct Works for the disposal of Sewage; and to supply Light by Electricity; and for other purposes.
Great Northern Railway Act 1880	43 & 44 Vict. c. cxl	6 August 1880
An Act to confer further powers with respect to the Great Northern Railway and to the joint undertakings of the Great Northern and Great Eastern and Great Northern and London and North-western Railway Companies.
Great Western Railway Act 1880	43 & 44 Vict. c. cxli	6 August 1880
An Act for conferring upon the Great Western Railway Company further Powers in connexion with their own Undertaking and the Undertakings of other Companies; for vesting in that Company the Undertakings of the Ely and Clydach Valleys, the Malmesbury, and the Mitcheldean Road and Forest of Dean Junction Railway Companies; for vesting in the Great Western Railway Company and the Bala and Festiniog Railway Company the Undertaking of the Festiniog and Blaenau Railway Company, Limited; and for other purposes.
King's Lynn Corporation Act 1880	43 & 44 Vict. c. cxlii	6 August 1880
An Act for extending the boundaries of the Municipal Borough of King's Lynn; for authorising the Corporation of the said borough to subscribe further moneys towards the King's Lynn Docks; for amending the King's Lynn Waterworks and Borough Improvement Act, 1859, (Note: King's Lynn Waterworks and Borough Improvement Act 1859) and the Eau Brink Acts; and for other purposes.
Liverpool Corporation Waterworks Act 1880	43 & 44 Vict. c. cxliii	6 August 1880
An Act for enabling the Mayor, Aldermen, and Citizens of the City of Liverpool in the county of Lancaster to obtain a supply of Water from the Rivers Vyrnwy, Marchnant, and Afon Cowny in Montgomeryshire; and for other purposes.
Liverpool United Gaslight Company's Act 1880	43 & 44 Vict. c. cxliv	6 August 1880
An Act to enable the Liverpool United Gaslight Company to erect additional Gasworks, and to extend their Limits of Supply.
London and North Western Railway Act 1880	43 & 44 Vict. c. cxlv	6 August 1880
An Act for conferring further powers upon the London and North-western Railway Company in connexion with their own Undertaking, and upon that Company jointly with the Lessees of the North and South Western Junction Railway, and the Great Western Railway Company, and the Lancashire and Yorkshire Railway Company, and the Manchester, Sheffield, and Lincolnshire Railway Company, and the Furness Railway Company, in respect of other Undertakings in which they are jointly interested; and for conferring further Powers upon the Lancashire Union Railways Company; and for other purposes.
Midland Railway (Additional Powers) Act 1880	43 & 44 Vict. c. cxlvi	6 August 1880
An Act for conferring additional powers on the Midland Railway Company in connexion with their own Undertaking and the Undertakings of the Sharpness New Docks and Gloucester and Birmingham Navigation Company and the Severn Bridge Railway Company; for raising further Capital; and for other purposes.
Oldham Improvement Act 1880	43 & 44 Vict. c. cxlvii	6 August 1880
An Act to alter and extend the borough of Oldham, to confer upon the Corporation further powers in relation to their Water and Gas undertakings, and for improving the Local Government of the borough; to amend the Acts relating to the borough; and for other purposes.
Banbury and Cheltenham Direct Railway Act 1880	43 & 44 Vict. c. cxlviii	6 August 1880
An Act for conferring further powers on the Banbury and Cheltenham Direct Railway Company in connexion with their authorised Undertaking; and for other purposes.
Dagenham and District Farmers' (Optional) Sewage Utilization Act 1880	43 & 44 Vict. c. cxlix	6 August 1880
An Act for incorporating the Dagenham and District Farmers' (Optional) Sewage Utilization Company, and for authorising them to construct Works for Supply of Sewage to Owners and Occupiers of Land in Dagenham and the adjacent District; and for other purposes.
Woodside and South Croydon Railway Act 1880	43 & 44 Vict. c. cl	6 August 1880
An Act for making a Railway from Woodside to South Croydon, in the county of Surrey; and for other purposes.
Black Sluice Drainage Act 1880	43 & 44 Vict. c. cli	6 August 1880
An Act for subjecting lands within the Black Sluice Level to further taxation for Outfall Improvements, and for increasing the area of taxation; and for other purposes.
Liverpool and Birkenhead Subway Act 1880	43 & 44 Vict. c. clii	6 August 1880
An Act for making Tunnels, Subways, and Roadways partly under the River Mersey between Liverpool and Birkenhead.
River Witham Outfall Improvement Act 1880	43 & 44 Vict. c. cliii	6 August 1880
An Act to authorise the construction of a New Cut and other Works for improving the Outfall of the River Witham, in the county of Lincoln, and the constitution of a Joint Board for effecting such works; and for other purposes.
Education Department Provisional Orders Confirmation (Cardiff, &c.) Act 1880	43 & 44 Vict. c. cliv	12 August 1880
An Act to confirm certain Provisional Orders made by the Education Department under the Elementary Education Act, 1870, (Note: Elementary Education Act 1870 (33 & 34 Vict. c. 75)) to enable the School Boards for Cardiff, Liverpool, Southampton, and Walton-on-Thames to put in force the Lands Clauses Consolidation Act, 1845, and the Acts amending the same.
	Cardiff Order 1880 The School Board for Cardiff, County of Glamorgan. Provisional Order for putting in force the Lands Clauses Consolidation Act, 1845.	
	Liverpool Order 1880 The School Board for Liverpool, County of Lancaster. Provisional Order for putting in force the Lands Clauses Consolidation Act, 1845.	
	Southampton Order 1880 The School Board for Southampton, County of Hants. Provisional Order for putting in force the Lands Clauses Consolidation Act, 1845.	
	Walton-on-Thames Order 1880 The School Board for Walton-on-Thames, County of Surrey. Provisional Order for putting in force the Lands Clauses Consolidation Act, 1845.	
London Tramways Company Capital Act 1880	43 & 44 Vict. c. clv	12 August 1880
An Act to confer further powers on the London Tramways Company (Limited).
Strathendrick and Aberfoyle Railway Act 1880	43 & 44 Vict. c. clvi	12 August 1880
An Act for making a Railway from the Blane Valley Railway to the Forth and Clyde Junction Railway at Gartness, and a Railway from the Forth and Clyde Junction Railway to Aberfoyle; and for other purposes.
Hinckley Local Board Gas Act 1880	43 & 44 Vict. c. clvii	12 August 1880
An Act to authorise the transfer of the Undertaking of the Hinckley Gaslight and Coke Company, Limited, to the Hinckley Local Government Board; and for other purposes.
Killorglin Railway Act 1880	43 & 44 Vict. c. clviii	12 August 1880
An Act to revive and amend the powers of the Killorglin Railway Act, 1871, (Note: Killorglin Railway Act 1871 (34 & 35 Vict. c. clxxviii)) for making a Railway in the county of Kerry from the Farranfore Station of the Great Southern and Western Railway to Killorglin, to provide for a Baronial Guarantee with reference to the Railway; and for other purposes.
Maidstone and Ashford Railway Act 1880	43 & 44 Vict. c. clix	12 August 1880
An Act for making Railways between Maidstone and Ashford in the county of Kent; and for other purposes.
Pontypridd, Caerphilly and Newport Railway Act 1880	43 & 44 Vict. c. clx	12 August 1880
An Act to authorise the Pontypridd, Caerphilly, and Newport Railway Company to deviate a portion of their authorised railway near Pontypridd.
Totnes, Paignton and Torquay Direct Railway Act 1880 (repealed)	43 & 44 Vict. c. clxi	12 August 1880
An Act for making a Railway in the county of Devon, to be called the Totnes, Paignton, and Torquay Direct Railway; and for other purposes. (Repealed by Totnes, Paignton and Torquay Direct Railway (Abandonment) Act 1884 (47 & 48 Vict. c. lv))
Preston Tramways Act 1880 (repealed)	43 & 44 Vict. c. clxii	12 August 1880
An Act to empower the Preston Tramways Company to accept leases of and to work Tramways to be hereafter constructed in or near the Borough of Preston, and to authorise them to raise additional Capital; and for other purposes. (Repealed by County of Lancashire Act 1984 (c. xxi))
Scarborough and Whitby Railway Act 1880	43 & 44 Vict. c. clxiii	12 August 1880
An Act to revive the powers and extend the periods for the compulsory purchase of Lands, and for the construction of the Railways authorised by the Scarborough and Whitby Railway Acts, 1871 (Note: Scarborough and Whitby Railway Act 1871 (34 & 35 Vict. c. lxxxv)) and 1873; (Note: Scarborough and Whitby Railway Act 1873 (36 & 37 Vict. c. liii)) and for other purposes.
Gateshead and District Tramways Act 1880	43 & 44 Vict. c. clxiv	12 August 1880
An Act to authorise the construction of Tramways in and near to the borough of Gateshead, in the county of Durham; and for other purposes.
Lynn and Fakenham Railway (Extensions) Act 1880	43 & 44 Vict. c. clxv	12 August 1880
An Act to enable the Lynn and Fakenham Railway Company to extend their Railway to Norwich and Blakeney; and for other purposes.
Metropolitan Railway Act 1880	43 & 44 Vict. c. clxvi	12 August 1880
An Act to authorise a Deviation in the Kingsbury and Harrow Railway; (Note: The Kingsbury and Harrow Railway was the Stanmore branch of the Metropolitan Railway.) the Revival and Extension of Time for the Purchase of Lands in connexion with the Works authorised by the Saint John's Wood Railway Act, 1873, (Note: Metropolitan and Saint John's Wood Railway Act 1873 (36 & 37 Vict. c. ccxlvii)) and the Metropolitan Railway Act, 1877; (Note: Metropolitan Railway Act 1877 (40 & 41 Vict. c. lxxxv)) the Purchase of other Lands; the diverting or stopping up of certain bridle road and footpaths; also to amend the Acts relating to the Hammersmith and City Railway (Note: Hammersmith and City Railway.) with respect to superfluous Lands, and the Metropolitan and District Railways Act, 1879, (Note: Metropolitan and District Railways (City Lines and Extensions) Act 1879 (42 & 43 Vict. c. cci)) with respect to Capital; and for other purposes.
North British Railway (Amalgamations, &c.) Act 1880	43 & 44 Vict. c. clxvii	12 August 1880
An Act to amalgamate the Port Carlisle Dock and Railway Company, the Carlisle and Silloth Bay Railway and Dock and the North British, Arbroath, and Montrose Railway Companies with the North British Railway Company, and to authorise the Company to make a Dock at Silloth; to purchase additional Lands; to make agreements with respect to the erection of Passenger Sheds at the Waverley Station; to guarantee Interest on sums raised for Dock Works at Bo'ness; to contribute to the Forth Bridge Railway Company, and to authorise the Newport Railway Company and the Company to raise more Money; also to extend the time for the sale of superfluous Lands; and for other purposes.
Alford and Sutton Tramways Act 1880	43 & 44 Vict. c. clxviii	12 August 1880
An Act for incorporating the Alford and Sutton Tramways Company and authorising them to construct Tramways from Alford to Sutton-le-Marsh in the parts of Lindsey in the county of Lincoln; and for other purposes.
North Dublin Street Tramways Act 1880	43 & 44 Vict. c. clxix	12 August 1880
An Act to empower the North Dublin Street Tramways Company to construct New Tramways; and for other purposes.
Greenock Harbour Act 1880 (repealed)	43 & 44 Vict. c. clxx	12 August 1880
An Act to alter and extend the powers of the Trustees of the Port and Harbours of Greenock in relation to the Harbours and Docks; and for other purposes. (Repealed by Greenock Port and Harbours Consolidation Act 1913 (3 & 4 Geo. 5. c. xlii))
Local Government Board (Ireland) Provisional Orders Confirmation (Artizans and Labourers Dwellings and Public Health) Act 1880	43 & 44 Vict. c. clxxi	26 August 1880
An Act to confirm a certain Provisional Order of the Local Government Board for Ireland made under the Artizans and Labourers Dwellings Improvement Act, 1875, (Note: Artisans' and Labourers' Dwellings Improvement Act 1875 (38 & 39 Vict. c. 36)) relating to the city of Dublin; and a certain Provisional Order of the said Board made under the Public Health (Ireland) Act, 1878, (Note: Public Health (Ireland) Act 1878 (41 & 42 Vict. c. 52)) relating to Waterworks in the city of Armagh.
	Dublin Provisional Order 1880 Provisional Order. Artizans and Labourers Dwellings Improvement Acts, 1875 and 1879 (Note: Artizans and Labourers Dwellings Improvement Act 1879 (42 & 43 Vict. c. 63)). City of Dublin.	
	Armagh Waterworks Provisional Order 1880 Armagh Waterworks. Provisional Order.	
Tramways Orders Confirmation (No. 1) Act 1880	43 & 44 Vict. c. clxxii	26 August 1880
An Act for confirming certain Provisional Orders made by the Board of Trade under the Tramways Act, 1870, (Note: Tramways Act 1870 (33 & 34 Vict. c. 78)) relating to Bath Tramways, Birkdale and Southport Tramways, Bristol Tramways (Extensions), Cambridge Street Tramways (Extension), Cardiff District and Penarth Harbour Tramways Croydon Street Tramways (Extensions), Darlington Tramways, Dudley, Sedgley, and Wolverhampton Tramways, Ipswich Tramways (Extensions), Llanelly Tramways, Merthyr Tramways, Peterborough Tramways, Staffordshire Tramways (Additional Powers), Stockton-on-Tees and District Tramways, Sunderland Tramways (Use of Mechanical Power), Withington Local Board Tramways, and Wolverhampton Tramways (Use of Mechanical Power).
	Bath Tramways Order 1880 Order authorising the construction of Tramways in the city and borough of Bath and its vicinity.	
	Birkdale and Southport Tramways Order 1880 Order authorising the Birkdale and Southport Tramways Company, Limited, to construct Tramways in the borough of Southport and the district of Birkdale in the county of Lancaster.	
	Bristol Tramways (Extensions) Order 1880 Order authorising the Bristol Tramways Company (Limited) to construct additional Tramways in the city and county of Bristol.	
	Cambridge Street Tramways (Extension) Order 1880 Order authorising the Cambridge Street Tramways Company to construct additional Street Tramways in the borough of Cambridge in the county of Cambridge.	
	Cardiff District and Penarth Harbour Tramways Order 1880 Order authorising the construction of Tramways in the borough of Cardiff in the county of Glamorgan.	
	Croydon Street Tramways (Extensions) Order 1880 Order authorising the Croydon Tramways Company to construct additional Street Tramways in the parish of Croydon in the county of Surrey.	
	Darlington Tramways Order 1880 Order authorising the construction of Tramways in the borough of Darlington in the county of Durham.	
	Dudley, Sedgley and Wolverhampton Tramways Order 1880	
	Wolverhampton Tramways Order 1880 Order authorising the construction of Tramways from Dudley in the county of Worcester to Wolverhampton in the county of Stafford.	
	Ipswich Tramways (Extensions) Order 1880 Order authorising the construction of additional Tramways in the borough of Ipswich in the county of Suffolk.	
	Llanelly Tramways Order 1880 Order authorising the construction of Tramways in the borough of Llanelly in the county of Carmarthen.	
	Merthyr Tramways Order 1880 Order authorising the construction of Tramways in the parish of Merthyr Tydfil in the county of Glamorgan.	
	Peterborough Tramways Order 1880 Order authorising the construction of Tramways in the city and borough of Peterborough in the county of Northampton.	
	Staffordshire Tramways (Additional Powers) Order 1880 Order to extend and amend the Staffordshire Tramways Order, 1879.	
	Stockton-on-Tees and District Tramways Order 1880 Order authorising the construction of Tramways in and near to the borough of Stockton in the county of Durham.	
	Sunderland Tramways (Use of Mechanical Power) Order 1880 Order authorising the use of Steam Power or any Mechanical Power on the Tramways of the Sunderland Tramways Company, Limited, and on the Tramways of the Mayor, Aldermen, and Burgesses of the borough of Sunderland.	
	Withington Local Board Tramways Order 1880 Order authorising the construction of Tramways in the Local Board district of Withington in the county of Lancaster.	
	Wolverhampton Tramways (Mechanical Power) Order 1880 Order authorising the use of Steam Power or any Mechanical Power on the Tramways of the Wolverhampton Tramways Company, Limited.	
Tramways Orders Confirmation (No. 2) Act 1880	43 & 44 Vict. c. clxxiii	26 August 1880
An Act for confirming certain Provisional Orders made by the Board of Trade under the Tramways Act, 1870, relating to Birmingham and Aston Tramways, Blackpool St. Anne's-on-the-Sea and Lytham Tramways, Bradford Corporation Tramways, Carlisle and District Tramways, Folkestone, Sandgate, and Hythe Tramways, North Staffordshire Tramways, Rothesay Tramways, Walsall and District Tramways, Walton-on-the-Hill Tramways, and Woolwich and Plumstead Tramways.
	Birmingham and Aston Tramways Order 1880 Order authorising the construction of Tramways in the parishes of Birmingham and Aston-juxta-Birmingham, in the county of Warwick.	
	Blackpool, St. Anne's-on-Sea and Lytham Tramways Order 1880 Order authorising the Blackpool, St. Anne's, and Lytham Tramways Company (Limited), to construct tramways in the borough of Blackpool and the districts of St. Anne's-on-the-Sea and Lytham, in the county of Lancaster.	
	Bradford Corporation Tramways Order 1880 Order authorising the Mayor, Aldermen, and Burgesses of the borough of Bradford to construct Tramways in the said borough.	
	Carlisle and District Tramways Order 1880 Order authorising the construction of Tramways in the City of Carlisle and the Neighbourhood thereof, in the County of Cumberland.	
	Folkestone, Sandgate and Seabrook Tramways Order 1880 Order authorising the Construction of Tramways from Folkestonе, through Sandgate to Seabrook, in the County of Kent.	
	North Staffordshire Tramways Order 1880 Order authorising the construction of Tramways in the borough of Hanley, the borough of Burslem, the district of the Local Board of Health of Tunstall, the district of the Rural Sanitary Authority of Wolstanton, and in the borough of Longton, in the parishes of Stoke-upon-Trent, Burslem, and Wolstanton, in the county of Stafford.	
	Rothesay Tramways Order 1880 Order authorising the construction of Tramways in the Royal burgh and parish of Rothesay, and in the parish of North Bute, all in the county of Bute.	
	Walsall and District Tramways Order 1880 Order authorising the construction of Tramways in the borough of Walsall, in the county of Stafford.	
	Walton-on-the-Hill Tramways Order 1880 Order authorising the Local Board for the district of Walton-on-the-Hill, in the county of Lancaster, to construct tramways in the said district.	
	Woolwich and Plumstead Tramways Order 1880 Order authorising the construction of Tramways from Woolwich to Plumstead, in the county of Kent.	
Kinsale Harbour Act 1880	43 & 44 Vict. c. clxxiv	26 August 1880
An Act to make further provision with respect to the Powers of the Commissioners for Public Works in Ireland in relation to a grant and loan for the Improvement of Kinsale Harbour, and to enable the Town Commissioners of Kinsale to guarantee a loan and levy rates for the purposes of such Improvement.
Leith Improvement Scheme Confirmation Act 1880	43 & 44 Vict. c. clxxv	26 August 1880
An Act to confirm a Provisional Order of one of Her Majesty's Principal Secretaries of State for the Improvement of Unhealthy Areas in the Parliamentary Burgh of Leith.
	Leith Order 1880 Artizans and Labourers Dwellings Improvement (Scotland) Act, 1875. (Note: Artisans and Labourers Dwellings Improvement (Scotland) Act 1875 (38 & 39 Vict. c. 49)) Parliamentary Burgh of Leith Improvement. Provisional Order.	
Forfar Gas Amendment Confirmation Act 1880	43 & 44 Vict. c. clxxvi	26 August 1880
An Act to confirm a Provisional Order made under the General Police and Improvement (Scotland) Act, 1862, relating to Forfar Gas.
	Forfar Order 1880 Royal Burgh of Forfar. Provisional Order under the General Police and Improvement (Scotland) Act, 1862. (25 & 26 Vict. cap. 101.)	
Drainage and Improvement of Lands Supplemental (Ireland) (No. 3) Act 1880	43 & 44 Vict. c. clxxvii	26 August 1880
An Act to confirm certain Provisional Orders under the Drainage and Improvement of Lands (Ireland) Act, 1863, and the Acts amending the same.
	Upper Silver River Drainage District Order 1880 In the Matter of the Upper Silver River Drainage District in the County of Westmeath and King's County.	
	River Lerr Drainage District Order 1880 In the matter of the River Lerr Drainage District in the counties of Kildare and Carlow.	
	Scariff Drainage District Order 1880 In the matter of the Scariff Drainage District in the county of Clare.	
Local Government Board's Provisional Orders Confirmation (Bethesda, &c.) Act 1880	43 & 44 Vict. c. clxxviii	26 August 1880
An Act to confirm certain Provisional Orders of the Local Government Board relating to the Improvement Act District of Bethesda, the Borough of Birmingham, the Local Government District of Haworth, the Lower Thames Valley Main Sewerage District, the Borough of Rochdale, the Rochester and Chatham Joint Hospital District, the Boroughs of Rotherham, Stockton, and Middlesbrough, and the City of York (two).
	Bethesda Order 1880 Provisional Order for altering the Bethesda Improvement Act, 1854. (Note: Bethesda Improvement Act 1854 (17 & 18 Vict. c. cxi))	
	Birmingham Corporation Stock Order 1880 Provisivnal Order for partially repealing and altering certain Local Acts (Note: Birmingham Improvement Act 1851 (14 & 15 Vict. c. xciii)) (Note: Birmingham Parks Act 1854 (17 & 18 Vict. c. cxiii)) (Note: Birmingham Improvement Act 1861 (24 & 25 Vict. c. ccvi)) (Note: Birmingham (Corporation) Gas Act 1875 (38 & 39 Vict. c. clxxviii)) (Note: Birmingham (Corporation) Water Act 1875 (38 & 39 Vict. c. clxxxviii)) (Note: Birmingham Closed Burial Grounds Act 1878 (41 & 42 Vict. c. xlii)) (Note: Birmingham (Corporation) Water Act 1879 (42 & 43 Vict. c. xxxvii)) and Confirming Acts. (Note: Tramways Orders Confirmation Act 1872 (No. 3) (35 & 36 Vict. c. clvii)) (Note: Tramways Orders Confirmation Act 1874 (37 & 38 Vict. c. clxxxiii)) (Note: Local Government Board's Provisional Orders Confirmation (Artizans and Labourers Dwellings) Act 1876 (39 & 40 Vict. c. ccxxxv)) (Note: Local Government Board's Provisional Orders Confirmation (Birmingham, &c.) Act 1876 (39 & 40 Vict. c. ccii)) (Note: Local Government Board's Provisional Orders Confirmation (Aspull, &c.) Act 1879 (42 & 43 Vict. c. cv))	
	Haworth Order 1880 Provisional Order for partially repealing, altering, and amending the Haworth Local Board of Health Act, 1872. (Note: Haworth Local Board of Health Act 1872 (35 & 36 Vict. c. cvii))	
	Lower Thames Valley Order 1880 Provisional Order for altering certain Confirming Acts. (Note: Local Government Board's Provisional Orders Confirmation (Joint Boards) Act 1877 (40 & 41 Vict. c. ccxxix)) (Note: Local Government Board's Provisional Orders Confirmation (Bournemouth, &c.) Act 1878 (41 & 42 Vict. c. clxii))	
	Rochdale Order 1880 Provisional Order for altering certain Local Acts. (Note: Rochdale Improvement Act 1853 (16 & 17 Vict. c. ccxx)) (Note: Rochdale Waterworks Act 1866 (29 & 30 Vict. c. clii)) (Note: Rochdale Improvement Act 1872 (35 & 36 Vict. c. cxlix)) (Note: Rochdale Improvement Act 1875 (38 & 39 Vict. c. xciv))	
	Rochester and Chatham Joint Hospital Order 1880 Provisional Order for forming a United District under Sect. 279 of the Public Health Act, 1875.	
	Rotherham Order 1880 Provisional Order for partially repealing, altering, and amending certain Local Acts. (Note: Rotherham and Kimberworth Local Board of Health Act 1863 (26 & 27 Vict. c. cxvii)) (Note: Rotherham and Kimberworth Local Board of Health Act 1870 (33 & 34 Vict. c. cxxxiv)) (Note: Rotherham Corporation Act 1875 (38 & 39 Vict. c. lxx)) (Note: Rotherham Borough Extension and Sewerage Act 1879 (42 & 43 Vict. c. cxci))	
	Stockton and Middlesbrough Order 1880 Provisional Order for altering the Stockton and Middlesbrough Corporations Waterworks Act, 1876. (Note: Stockton and Middlesbrough Corporations Waterworks Act 1876 (39 & 40 Vict. c. ccxxx))	
	York Order (1) 1880 Provisional Order to enable the Urban Sanitary Authority for the City of York to put in force the Compulsory Clauses of the Lands Clauses Consolidation Acts, 1845, 1860, and 1869.	
	York Order (2) 1880 Provisional Order for altering the York (Skeldergate Bridge) Improvement Act, 1875. (Note: York (Skeldergate Bridge) Improvement Act 1875 (38 & 39 Vict. c. lxii))	
Tralee and Fenit Railway Act 1880	43 & 44 Vict. c. clxxix	26 August 1880
An Act for making a Railway from Tralee to Fenit, in the county of Kerry and for other purposes.
Anstruther and St. Andrews Railway Act 1880	43 & 44 Vict. c. clxxx	26 August 1880
An Act for making a Railway from Anstruther to Saint Andrews, in the county of Fife; and for other purposes.
Gaslight and Coke and other Gas Companies Acts Amendment Act 1880	43 & 44 Vict. c. clxxxi	26 August 1880
An Act to make further provision for regulating the supply of Gas by the Gas Light and Coke Company, the Commercial Gas Company, and the South Metropolitan Gas Company, and to amend the Acts relating to the said Companies.
Halesowen Railway Act 1880	43 & 44 Vict. c. clxxxii	26 August 1880
An Act to confer further powers on the Halesowen Railway Company; and for other purposes.
South Western Railway (Various Powers) Act 1880	43 & 44 Vict. c. clxxxiii	26 August 1880
An Act for enabling the London and South-western Railway Company to execute further Works and to acquire further Lands for the improvement of their Railways; for confirming certain agreements; and for conferring other Powers upon the Company and other Companies; and for other purposes.
Belfast Central Railway (New Lines, &c.) Act 1880	43 & 44 Vict. c. clxxxiv	26 August 1880
An Act to authorise the Belfast Central Railway Company to make new Railways and Works; to lay additional Rails on their existing Railways and on certain parts of the Belfast and County Down and Belfast, Holywood, and Bangor Railways; and for other purposes.
Coventry and District Tramways Act 1880 (repealed)	43 & 44 Vict. c. clxxxv	26 August 1880
An Act to authorise the construction of Tramways in and near to the towns of Coventry and Bedworth, and from Coventry to Bedworth, in the county of Warwick; and for other purposes. (Repealed by West Midlands County Council Act 1980 (c. xi))
Freshwater, Yarmouth and Newport Railway Act 1880	43 & 44 Vict. c. clxxxvi	26 August 1880
An Act for incorporating the Freshwater, Yarmouth, and Newport Railway Company; and for other purposes.
Neath Harbour Act 1880	43 & 44 Vict. c. clxxxvii	26 August 1880
An Act for extending the time for completing the Neath Harbour Works; for authorising the Harbour Commissioners to borrow further Money; and for other purposes.
Caledonian Railway (Additional Powers) Act 1880	43 & 44 Vict. c. clxxxviii	26 August 1880
An Act for enabling the Caledonian Railway Company to make Railways and other Works, acquire Lands, and abandon portions of Works in the counties of Lanark, Renfrew, and Edinburgh; to maintain, work, and contribute to the Alloa Railway; to establish an Accident and Life Insurance Fund for their servants, and to raise additional Money; for extending the authorised periods for completion of certain Railways in Lanarkshire, and acquisition of Lands in connexion therewith, and sale of superfluous Lands; and for other purposes.
Filey Harbour Act 1880	43 & 44 Vict. c. clxxxix	26 August 1880
An Act to alter the Filey Pier and Harbour Order, 1878, and to dissolve the Company empowered thereby, and re-incorporate them with fresh powers.
Hounslow and Metropolitan Railway Act 1880	43 & 44 Vict. c. cxc	26 August 1880
An Act for incorporating a Company and authorising them to make and maintain a Railway from Hounslow to Ealing, in the county of Middlesex; and for other purposes.
North Staffordshire Railway Act 1880	43 & 44 Vict. c. cxci	26 August 1880
An Act to authorise the North Staffordshire Railway Company to make a railway to connect their Churnet Valley Line with the Stoke Branch therefrom; to purchase additional Lands, and make certain Sidings also; for extending the time for the sale of certain superfluous Lands, and to alter certain of the provisions of the existing Acts with respect to Rates and Charges; and for other purposes.
Ramsgate and Margate Tramways Act 1880	43 & 44 Vict. c. cxcii	26 August 1880
An Act for empowering the Ramsgate and Margate Tramways Company to construct additional Tramways; to raise further Capital; to use Steam or other Mechanical Power; and for other purposes.
Muirheads' Patent Act 1880	43 & 44 Vict. c. cxciii	26 August 1880
An Act for rendering valid certain Letters Patent granted to John Muirhead the younger, and Alexander Muirhead, of Regency Street, in the City of Westminster, for the Invention of Improvements in Electric Telegraphs.
Edinburgh Suburban and Southside Junction Railway Act 1880	43 & 44 Vict. c. cxciv	26 August 1880
An Act to authorise the construction of the Edinburgh Suburban and Southside Junction Railway; and for other purposes.
Yarmouth Union Railway Act 1880	43 & 44 Vict. c. cxcv	26 August 1880
An Act to incorporate a Company for the construction of the Yarmouth Union Railway; and for other purposes.
Brentford and Isleworth Tramways Act 1880 or the Brentford and Isleworth Tramways Extension Act 1880	43 & 44 Vict. c. cxcvi	26 August 1880
An Act for empowering the Brentford and Isleworth Tramways Company to construct new Tramways, in the county of Middlesex; and for other purposes.
Giants' Causeway, Portrush and Bush Valley Railway and Tramways Act 1880	43 & 44 Vict. c. cxcvii	26 August 1880
An Act to authorise the construction of a Railway and Tramways in the county of Antrim, to be called "The Giants Causeway, Portrush, and Bush Valley Railway and Tramways;" and for other purposes.
Glenariff Railway and Pier Act 1880	43 & 44 Vict. c. cxcviii	26 August 1880
An Act for incorporating the Glenariff Railway and Pier Company; and for other purposes.
Hull, Barnsley and West Riding Junction Railway and Dock Act 1880	43 & 44 Vict. c. cxcix	26 August 1880
An Act to authorise the construction and maintenance of the Hull, Barnsley, and West Riding Junction Railways, and of a Dock and other Works in connexion therewith; and for other purposes.
Teign Valley Railway Act 1880	43 & 44 Vict. c. cc	26 August 1880
An Act for conferring further powers on the Teign Valley Railway Company in relation to their undertaking; and for other purposes.
Skipton and Kettlewell Railway Act 1880 (repealed)	43 & 44 Vict. c. cci	26 August 1880
An Act for incorporating the Skipton and Kettlewell Railway Company, and authorising them to make and maintain the Skipton and Kettlewell Railway; and for other purposes. (Repealed by Skipton and Kettlewell Railway (Abandonment) Act 1885 (48 & 49 Vict. c. xiv))
South Eastern Railway Act 1880	43 & 44 Vict. c. ccii	26 August 1880
An Act for conferring on the South-eastern Railway Company further powers with reference to their own undertakings, and those of other Companies; and for other purposes.
Southsea Railway Act 1880	43 & 44 Vict. c. cciii	26 August 1880
An Act to incorporate a Company for the Construction of the Southsea Railway; and for other purposes.
Drainage and Improvement of Lands Supplemental Act (Ireland) 1880 or the Drainage and Improvement of Lands Supplemental (Ireland) Act 1880	43 & 44 Vict. c. cciv	7 September 1880
An Act to confirm a Provisional Order under the Drainage and Improvement of Lands (Ireland) Act, 1863, and the Acts amending the same.
	Lough and River Erne Order 1880 In the Matter of the Iough and River Erne Drainage and Navigation District in the Counties of Fermanagh, Cavan, Monaghan, and Donegal.	
Education Department Provisional Order Confirmation (London) Act 1880	43 & 44 Vict. c. ccv	7 September 1880
An Act to confirm a Provisional Order made by the Education Department under the Elementary Education Act, 1870, to enable the School Board for London to put in force the Lands Clauses Consolidation Act, 1845, and the Acts amending the same.
	London Order 1880 The School Board for London. Provisional Order for putting in force the Lands Clauses Consolidation Act, 1845.	
Mulkear Drainage District Act 1880	43 & 44 Vict. c. ccvi	7 September 1880
An Act to enable the Commissioners of Public Works in Ireland to lend the sum of One thousand pounds to the Mulkear Drainage District Board.
Liverpool Corporation Loans Act 1880 (repealed)	43 & 44 Vict. c. ccvii	7 September 1880
An Act for making further Provision respecting the borrowing of Money by the Corporation of Liverpool; and for other purposes. (Repealed by Liverpool Corporation Act 1921 (11 & 12 Geo. 5. c. lxxiv))
Nottingham Corporation Loans Act 1880 (repealed)	43 & 44 Vict. c. ccviii	7 September 1880
An Act to make further Provision respecting the borrowing of Money by the Corporation of Nottingham; and for other purposes. (Repealed by Statute Law (Repeals) Act 1995 (c. 44))
Cathcart District Railway Act 1880	43 & 44 Vict. c. ccix	7 September 1880
An Act to authorise the construction of Railways in and near to the District of Cathcart, on the south side of Glasgow; and for other purposes.
Clara and Banagher Railway Act 1880	43 & 44 Vict. c. ccx	7 September 1880
An Act to revive and extend the powers of the Midland Counties and Shannon Junction Railway Company for the purchase of lands and execution of works; to facilitate the completion and beneficial working of their undertaking; to change the name of the Company; and for other purposes.
Ennis and West Clare Railway Act 1880	43 & 44 Vict. c. ccxi	7 September 1880
An Act to authorise the construction of a railway in the county of Clare, to be called the Ennis and West Clare Railway; and for other purposes.

=== Private acts ===
Short title	Citation	Royal assent
Long title
Blenheim Settled Estates Act 1880	43 & 44 Vict. c. 1 Pr.	9 July 1880
An Act to extend the Power of Sale contained in the Resettlement of the Blenheim Settled Estates to the Sunderland Library; and for other purposes.
Leitrim Estates Act 1880	43 & 44 Vict. c. 2 Pr.	9 July 1880
An Act for giving further effect to a Compromise of certain opposing Claims affecting the Estates of William Sydney, Earl of Leitrim, deceased, in the counties of Leitrim, Donegal, Galway, and Kildare in Ireland; and for giving effect to a further arrangement respecting the said Estates.
Lonsdale Settled Estates Act 1880	43 & 44 Vict. c. 3 Pr.	9 July 1880
An Act to enable the Trustees of the Settled Estates of the Right Honourable St. George Henry Earl of Lonsdale to purchase certain Mines of Coal and other Minerals belonging to the Crown, and lying under the Sea adjoining the Coast of the county of Cumberland; and to raise Money for effecting such Purchase by mortgage of the Settled Estates, or parts thereof; and for other purposes.
Marquess of Abergavenny's Estate Act 1880	43 & 44 Vict. c. 4 Pr.	12 August 1880
An Act for making further provisions concerning the settled Estates of the Marquess of Abergavenny.
Duke of Leeds Estate Act 1880	43 & 44 Vict. c. 5 Pr.	26 August 1880
An Act to confer upon the Trustees of the Family Estates settled by the Will of the Most Noble Francis Godolphin D'Arcy, seventh Duke of Leeds, powers of Sale and Exchange, and powers to raise moneys for the purposes of the Settled Estates; and for other purposes.
Katz Naturalization Act 1880 (Note: This act was not printed by the Queen's Printer.)	43 & 44 Vict. c. 6 Pr.	29 June 1880
An Act to naturalize Hermann Katz, and to grant to and confer upon him all the rights, privileges, and capacities of a natural-born Subject of Her Majesty the Queen.
Lord Byron Indemnity Act 1880	43 & 44 Vict. c. 7 Pr.	19 July 1880
An Act to relieve the Right Honourable George Frederick William Baron Byron from certain disabilities and penalties in consequence of his having sat and voted in the House of Peers without being duly qualified by making and subscribing the Oath prescribed by Law.
Posen's Naturalization Act 1880	43 & 44 Vict. c. 9 Pr.	6 August 1880
An Act to naturalize Edward Max Posen, and to grant to and confer upon him all the rights, privileges, and capacities of a natural-born Subject of Her Majesty the Queen.
Lord Plunkett's Indemnity Act 1880	43 & 44 Vict. c. 10 Pr.	7 September 1880
An Act to relieve the Right Honourable William Conyngham Baron Plunket from certain disabilities and penalties in consequence of his having sat and voted in the House of Peers without being duly qualified by making and subscribing the Oath prescribed by Law.

=== Sources ===
- The Public General Statutes, Volume 16: 43 & 44 Victoria – 1880. H. M. Stationery Office. – via HathiTrust.
- Britain, Great (1880). The Public General Statutes: With a List of the Local and Private Acts Passed in the ... Years of the Reign of ... : Being the ... Session of the ... Parliament of the United Kingdom of Great Britain and Ireland. Vol. 16. G.E. Eyre and W. Spottiswoode, printers to the Queen's most excellent majesty. – via Google Books.

== See also ==
- List of acts of the Parliament of the United Kingdom
