= Simon Deakin =

Simon Deakin FBA
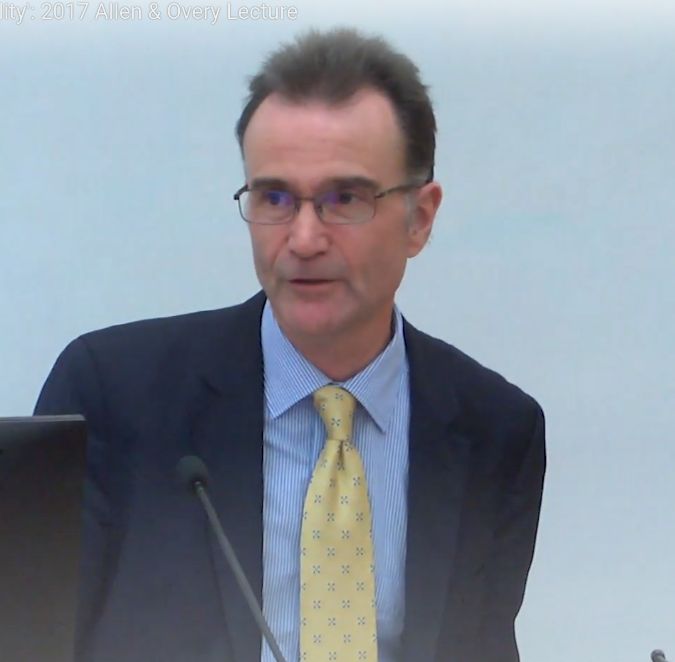
- Deakin delivering a lecture in 2017
- Born: 26 March 1961 (age 65)

Academic background
- Education: University of Cambridge
- Thesis: Contract, Labour Law and the Developing Employment Relationship (1989)
- Doctoral advisor: Brian Napier; Frank Wilkinson

Academic work
- Discipline: Law
- Sub-discipline: Labour law; social rights; economics of law
- Institutions: Peterhouse, Cambridge
- Main interests: Labour law; private law; corporate governance

Simon Deakin FBA (born 26 March 1961) is Professor of Law at the Faculty of Law, Cambridge, and a Fellow of Peterhouse, Cambridge. He is regarded as the leading expert in the field of employment law and labour law and is the programme director in the Cambridge Centre for Business Research (CBR), as well as an associate Faculty member of the Judge Business School.

== Education ==
Deakin holds a BA and a PhD in law from the University of Cambridge. His doctoral dissertation was awarded the Yorke Prize for legal writing. He took up his first lecturing post at Queen Mary and Westfield College, London, in 1987, after a year as a Bigelow Fellow at the University of Chicago. He joined the Cambridge Law Faculty in 1990 (first as a lecturer, then as a reader). He was appointed Professor of Law in 2005.

== Career ==
Deakin was a visiting fellow at the Maison des Sciences de l’Homme Ange Guépin, Nantes, in 1993 and 1995, and the Centre for Employment and Labour Relations Law, University of Melbourne, in 1996. In 2003 he was BNL Visiting professor of European Law at Columbia University and in 2004 a visiting fellow in the Department of Law, European University Institute, Florence. Since 2004 he has been Omron visiting fellow at Doshisha University, Kyoto. From 2001 to 2006 he was the Robert Monks Professor of Corporate Governance in the Judge Business School at Cambridge. In 2005, he was elected Fellow of the British Academy.

Present research projects include work on law, finance and development; reflexive governance in the public interest; gender equality and corporate governance; and capabilities and labour markets in Europe.

== Personal life ==
Deakin lives in Cambridge with his wife. They have one son.

== Publications ==
Books

- Markesinis and Deakin's Tort Law 6th ed (OUP 2007)
- Labour Law 4th ed (Hart 2005) (with Gillian Morris)
- The Law of the Labour Market: Industrialization, Employment, and Legal Evolution (OUP 2005) (with Frank Wilkinson)
- Contracts, Co-operation, and Competition: Studies in Economics, Management, and Law (OUP 1997) (ed with Jonathan Mitchie)

Articles

- '‘Enterprise‐Risk’: The Juridical Nature of the Firm Revisited' (2003) 32(2) ILJ 97
