= Watford Power Station =

Former coal-fired power station

- Country: England
- Location: Hertfordshire, East of England
- Coordinates: 51.642896°N 0.404338°W
- Status: Demolished
- Construction began: 1898
- Commission date: Coal-fired 1900; gas turbine 1980
- Decommission date: Coal-fired 1968; gas turbine 1990
- Owner: As operator
- Operators: Watford Corporation Electricity Department (until 1948); British Electricity Authority (1948–1955); Central Electricity Authority (1955–1957); Central Electricity Generating Board (1958–1990)

Thermal power station
- Primary fuel: Coal, distillate fuel oil
- Chimneys: 6 (coal-fired station), 2 gas turbine
- Cooling towers: 2 (coal-fired); 2 gas turbine
- Cooling source: River water and cooling towers (coal-fired), air cooled heat exchangers (gas turbine)

Power generation
- Units operational: 37.25 MW (in 1967); two 70 MW gas turbine
- Units decommissioned: All
- Nameplate capacity: 37.25 MW (in 1967); two 70 MW gas turbines
- Annual net output: (See tables)

Watford Power Station was a coal-fired power station situated in Watford's Riverside area. The station was built by the Watford Corporation Electricity Department starting with the installation of cables in 1899 with completion around 1900, near the banks of the River Colne. A gas turbine power station was commissioned in 1980.

== Development ==
The Borough of Watford was authorised to construct an electricity system in 1897 by the Watford Electric Lighting Order 1897 confirmed by the Electric Lighting Orders Confirmation (No. 3) Act 1897 (60 & 61 Vict. c. lxiii). The power station was built near the Watford and Rickmansworth Railway and a rail siding spurred into the site allowing coal to be brought in from the north Midlands. It appears the original coal-fired power station was a large gothic building with six chimneys; this was utilised until 1968, when the operation became uneconomic.

The station opened in June 1899 with a capacity of 350-kW. It consisted of two Babcock & Wilcox water tube boilers supplying steam to two 150 kW and one 30 kW Brush Mordey steam alternators. It was a single phase fifty-cycle system generating at 2200 volts and supplying sub-stations in various parts of the town, in which the pressure was reduced to 200 volts for distribution.

New generating equipment was added as the demand for electricity increased. The generating capacity, maximum load, and electricity generated and sold was as follows:

Watford power station generating capacity, load and electricity produced and sold, 1912–37
Year	Generating capacity, MW	Maximum load, MW	Electricity generated, GWh	Electricity sold, GWh
1912/3	1.88	1.020	1.904	1.701
1918/9	3.50	1.185	3.694	3.170
1919/20	3.50	1.920	4.583	3.793
1923/4	4.30	3.510	8.596	6.884
1937/8	36.22	22.18	43.446	62.702

In 1923 the electricity plant comprised 1 × 150 kW and 1 × 500 kW reciprocating engines and generators, and 1 × 500 kW, 1 × 650 kW and 2 × 1,250 kW turbo-alternators. The total generating capacity of the station was 4,300 kW. The total output of the boiler plant was 67,200 lb/hr (8.47 kg/s) of steam. Electricity was available as single phase AC, 200V. In 1923 the station generated 6.884 GWh of electricity, some of this was used in the plant, the total amount sold was 5.835 GWh. The revenue from sales of current was £55,695, this gave a surplus of revenue over expenses of £29,720.

The station was further extended in 1926 by the installation of a 6250-kW set and boiler plant, and in 1928 by a 7000-kW set and boilers. At this stage the total capacity of the plant was 21,070 kW.

In 1931 an application was made to the Electricity Commissioners for their sanction to extend the plant by the installation of a 12,500-kW set and boilers and although some opposition was at first met with, the Commissioners were eventually convinced that the economies of the station were such as to justify it becoming a selected station to operate under the South-East England electricity scheme. Sanction was eventually given for the installation of a 15,000-kW set with a larger size of boiler.

Since 1918 the Brush Electrical Engineering Company has been responsible for the installation of six Brush-Ljungstrom turbo-generator sets. The first was a 1850-kW machine, the second installed a year later of the same capacity, the third, put into operation in 1922, a 4120-kW set, the fourth, put to work in 1926, a 6250-kW set, the fifth, installed in 1928, a 7000-kW set, whilst the sixth, installed last year, is capable of developing 15,000 kW

By 1937 the electricity plant comprised 1 × 150 kW reciprocating engine and generator, and 2 × 1850 kW, 1 × 4120 kW, 1 × 6250 kW, 1 × 7,000 kW and 1 × 15,000 kW turbo-alternators. A total of 36.22 MW.

By 1950 the electricity plant comprised 1 × 16.5 MW , 1 × 7.0 MW, 1 × 6.25 MW, 1 ×4.0 MW and 2 × 2.0 MW turbo-alternators. A total of 37.75 MW.

By 1961 the installed capacity of the station was 37.25 megawatts (MW), with an output capacity of 27 MW. The oldest operational generating equipment had been installed in 1918. The chain grate boilers had a total steam generating capacity of 300,000 lb/hr (37.8 kg/s), the steam conditions were 250 psi (17.24 bar) and 399 °C. Water from the River Crane and cooling towers were used to condense steam and provide cooling. In 1950 there was a single cooling tower of 0.25 million gallons per hour. In 1960 there were two cooling towers of 0.25 m.g.p.h. film and Davenport 0.2 m.g.p.h. The overall thermal efficiency of the station in 1967 was 15.45 per cent. The electricity output of the station in its final years was as follows:

Watford coal-fired power station electricity produced, GWh
Year	1946	1947	1948	1950	1954	1955	1957	1958	1960/1	1961/2	1962/3	1964	1965	1966	1967
Electricity, GWh	43.653	44.8	55.1	53.54	46.42	48.26	37.21	36.34	20.063	21.609	24.422	32.363	23.915	27.900	28.149

The coal-fired station was closed in March 1968. In the early 1970s the site was cleared for a new gas turbine power station.

=== Gas turbine station ===
In 1971 the CEGB announced that it was seeking consent to build a new set of gas turbine power stations to meet peak load demands. These would be located near old or redundant stations that were close to centres of demand. The first of these was Letchworth followed by Watford. It was envisaged the plant would cost £6.5 million and be operational in 1975. The project was delayed and the new station at Watford was commissioned in 1980. It had two GEC Gas Turbine Quad Olympus 70 MW oil-fired gas turbines giving a maximum capability of 140 MW. The electricity output of the gas turbine station was as follows:

Watford GT power station electricity produced, GWh
Year	1980	1981	1982	1983	1984	1985	1986
Electricity, GWh	1.332	2.325	13.877	5.284	4.882	49.974	4.982

The high operational output in 1984-85 is associated with the 1984-5 miners' strike.

The gas turbine station was decommissioned in 1990 and subsequently demolished.

The site is now used for step-down transformers.
