= List of acts of the Parliament of the United Kingdom from 1897 =

This is a complete list of acts of the Parliament of the United Kingdom for the year 1897.

Note that the first parliament of the United Kingdom was held in 1801; parliaments between 1707 and 1800 were either parliaments of Great Britain or of Ireland). For acts passed up until 1707, see the list of acts of the Parliament of England and the list of acts of the Parliament of Scotland. For acts passed from 1707 to 1800, see the list of acts of the Parliament of Great Britain. See also the list of acts of the Parliament of Ireland.

For acts of the devolved parliaments and assemblies in the United Kingdom, see the list of acts of the Scottish Parliament, the list of acts of the Northern Ireland Assembly, and the list of acts and measures of Senedd Cymru; see also the list of acts of the Parliament of Northern Ireland.

The number shown after each act's title is its chapter number. Acts passed before 1963 are cited using this number, preceded by the year(s) of the reign during which the relevant parliamentary session was held; thus the Union with Ireland Act 1800 is cited as "39 & 40 Geo. 3 c. 67", meaning the 67th act passed during the session that started in the 39th year of the reign of George III and which finished in the 40th year of that reign. Note that the modern convention is to use Arabic numerals in citations (thus "41 Geo. 3" rather than "41 Geo. III"). Acts of the last session of the Parliament of Great Britain and the first session of the Parliament of the United Kingdom are both cited as "41 Geo. 3". Acts passed from 1963 onwards are simply cited by calendar year and chapter number.

All modern acts have a short title, e.g. the Local Government Act 2003. Some earlier acts also have a short title given to them by later acts, such as by the Short Titles Act 1896.

== 60 & 61 Vict. ==
The third session of the 26th Parliament of the United Kingdom, which met from 19 January 1897 until 6 August 1897.

=== Public general acts ===
Short title	Citation	Royal assent
Long title
Local Government Act 1897 (repealed)	60 & 61 Vict. c. 1	16 February 1897
An Act to amend the Law as to Qualifications for Elections to Parish Councils and as to the Annual Assembly of the Parish Meeting. (Repealed by Local Government Act 1933 (23 & 24 Geo. 5. c. 51))
County Dublin Surveyors Act 1897 (repealed)	60 & 61 Vict. c. 2	29 March 1897
An Act to amend the Law relating to the appointment of Surveyors in the County of Dublin. (Repealed by Local Government (Ireland) Act 1898 (61 & 62 Vict. c. 37))
Army (Annual) Act 1897 (repealed)	60 & 61 Vict. c. 3	29 March 1897
An Act to provide, during Twelve Months, for the Discipline and Regulation of the Army. (Repealed by Statute Law Revision Act 1908 (8 Edw. 7. c. 49))
Consolidated Fund (No. 1) Act 1897 (repealed)	60 & 61 Vict. c. 4	29 March 1897
An Act to apply certain sums out of the Consolidated Fund to the service of the years ending on the thirty-first day of March one thousand eight hundred and ninety-six, one thousand eight hundred and ninety-seven, and one thousand eight hundred and ninety-eight. (Repealed by Statute Law Revision Act 1908 (8 Edw. 7. c. 49))
Voluntary Schools Act 1897 (repealed)	60 & 61 Vict. c. 5	8 April 1897
An Act to provide for a Grant out of the Exchequer in Aid of Voluntary Elementary Schools, and for the Exemption from Rates of those Schools, and to repeal part of Section Nineteen of the Elementary Education Act, 1876. (Note: Elementary Education Act 1876 (39 & 40 Vict. c. 79)) (Repealed by Education Act 1921 (11 & 12 Geo. 5. c. 51))
Military Lands Act 1897	60 & 61 Vict. c. 6	8 April 1897
An Act to amend the Military Lands Act, 1892. (Note: Military Lands Act 1892 (55 & 56 Vict. c. 43))
Military Works Act 1897 (repealed)	60 & 61 Vict. c. 7	8 April 1897
An Act to provide for defraying the Expenses of certain Military Works and other Military Services. (Repealed by Statute Law Revision Act 1950 (14 Geo. 6. c. 6))
Trusts (Scotland) Act 1897 (repealed)	60 & 61 Vict. c. 8	3 June 1897
An Act to amend the Trusts (Scotland) Act, 1867, Amendment Act, 1887. (Note: Trusts (Scotland) Act 1867 Amendment Act 1887 (50 & 51 Vict. c. 18)) (Repealed by Trusts (Scotland) Act 1921 (11 & 12 Geo. 5. c. 58))
Archdeaconry of Cornwall Act 1897	60 & 61 Vict. c. 9	3 June 1897
An Act to amend the Law as to the Endowment of the Archdeaconry of Cornwall.
East India Company's Officers Superannuation Act 1897 (repealed)	60 & 61 Vict. c. 10	3 June 1897
An Act to remove doubts as to the power of the Secretary of State in Council of India to grant Superannuation and Compensation Allowances in certain cases to Officers on his Establishment. (Repealed by Statute Law Revision Act 1908 (8 Edw. 7. c. 49))
Regular and Elders' Widows' Funds Act 1897 (repealed)	60 & 61 Vict. c. 11	3 June 1897
An Act to make provision for the transfer of the Assets, Liabilities, and Management of the Regular Widows' Fund and of the Elders' Widows' Fund to the Secretary of State in Council of India, and for other purposes in relation thereto. (Repealed by Statute Law (Repeals) Act 1971 (c. 52))
Railway Assessors (Scotland) Superannuation Act 1897 (repealed)	60 & 61 Vict. c. 12	3 June 1897
An Act to provide Superannuation Allowances for the Assessor of Railways and Canals in Scotland, and the Clerks and other Officers permanently employed by him. (Repealed by Assessor of Public Undertakings (Scotland) Act 1934 (24 & 25 Geo. 5. c. 22))
Edinburgh University (Transfer of Patronage) Act 1897	60 & 61 Vict. c. 13	3 June 1897
An Act for transferring the right of Presentation to the Professorships of Botany and Natural History in the University of Edinburgh.
Metropolitan Police Courts (Holidays) Act 1897 (repealed)	60 & 61 Vict. c. 14	3 June 1897
An Act for enabling the Metropolitan Police Courts to be closed on Special Bank Holidays. (Repealed by Administration of Justice Act 1964 (c. 42))
Navy and Marines (Wills) Act 1897 (repealed)	60 & 61 Vict. c. 15	3 June 1897
An Act to amend the Navy and Marines (Wills) Act, 1865. (Note: Navy and Marines (Wills) Act 1865 (28 & 29 Vict. c. 72)) (Repealed by Navy and Marines (Wills) Act 1930 (20 & 21 Geo. 5. c. 38))
Elementary Education Act 1897 (repealed)	60 & 61 Vict. c. 16	3 June 1897
An Act to amend Section Ninety-seven of the Elementary Education Act, 1870. (Note: Elementary Education Act 1870 (33 & 34 Vict. c. 75)) (Repealed by Education Act 1902 (2 Edw. 7. c. 42) and Education (London) Act 1903 (3 Edw. 7. c. 24))
Supreme Court of Judicature (Ireland) Act 1897 (repealed)	60 & 61 Vict. c. 17	3 June 1897
An Act to provide for an Appeal in Ireland in Cases stated by Justices in certain Civil Matters. (Repealed by Judicature (Northern Ireland) Act 1978 (c. 23))
Juries Detention Act 1897 (repealed)	60 & 61 Vict. c. 18	15 July 1897
An Act to permit Juries to separate in cases of Felony. (Repealed by Criminal Justice Act 1948 (11 & 12 Geo. 6. c. 58))
Preferential Payments in Bankruptcy Amendment Act 1897 (repealed)	60 & 61 Vict. c. 19	15 July 1897
An Act to amend the Law regarding Preferential Payments in the case of Companies. (Repealed by Companies (Consolidation) Act 1908 (8 Edw. 7. c. 69))
Quarter Sessions Jurors (Ireland) Act 1897 (repealed)	60 & 61 Vict. c. 20	15 July 1897
An Act to provide for the relief of Jurors from unnecessary attendance at Courts of Quarter Sessions in Ireland. (Repealed by Judicature (Northern Ireland) Act 1978 (c. 23))
Mersey Channels Act 1897 (repealed)	60 & 61 Vict. c. 21	15 July 1897
An Act to make Rules for preventing Collisions in the Sea Channels leading to the River Mersey. (Repealed by Merchant Shipping Act 1995 (c. 21))
Market Gardeners Compensation (Scotland) Act 1897 (repealed)	60 & 61 Vict. c. 22	15 July 1897
An Act to amend the Provisions of the Agricultural Holdings (Scotland) Act, 1883, (Note: Agricultural Holdings (Scotland) Act 1883 (46 & 47 Vict. c. 62)) so far as they relate to Market Gardens. (Repealed by Agricultural Holdings (Scotland) Act 1908 (8 Edw. 7. c. 64))
Extraordinary Tithe Act 1897 (repealed)	60 & 61 Vict. c. 23	15 July 1897
An Act to remove Doubts arising under the Extraordinary Tithe Redemption Act, 1886. (Note: Extraordinary Tithe Redemption Act 1886 (49 & 50 Vict. c. 54)) (Repealed by Tithe Act 1936 (26 Geo. 5 & 1 Edw. 8. c. 43))
Finance Act 1897 (repealed)	60 & 61 Vict. c. 24	15 July 1897
An Act to grant certain Duties of Customs and Inland Revenue. (Repealed by Statute Law Revision Act 1908 (8 Edw. 7. c. 49), Finance (1909-10) Act 1910 (10 Edw. 7 & 1 Geo. 5. c. 8), Income Tax Act 1918 (8 & 9 Geo. 5. c. 40), Customs and Excise Act 1952 (15 & 16 Geo. 6 & 1 Eliz. 2. c. 44), Finance Act 1967 (c. 54) and Statute Law (Repeals) Act 1969 (c. 52))
Patent Office (Extension) Act 1897	60 & 61 Vict. c. 25	6 August 1897
An Act for the acquisition of Land for the Extension of the Patent Office, and for purposes connected therewith.
Metropolitan Police Courts Act 1897	60 & 61 Vict. c. 26	6 August 1897
An Act for transferring the Expenses of Police Courts to the Metropolitan Police Fund, and for making provision with respect to the Courts of the Stipendiary Magistrate of Chatham and Sheerness.
Public Offices (Whitehall) Site Act 1897	60 & 61 Vict. c. 27	6 August 1897
An Act for the acquisition of a Site for Public Offices in or near Whitehall, and for other purposes connected therewith.
Poor Law Officers Superannuation Act Amendment Act 1897 (repealed)	60 & 61 Vict. c. 28	6 August 1897
An Act to amend the Poor Law Officers Superannuation Act, 1896, (Note: Poor Law Officers Superannuation Act 1896 (59 & 60 Vict. c. 50)) as respects Female Nurses appointed after the commencement of the said Act. (Repealed by Local Government Act 1929 (19 & 20 Geo. 5. c. 17))
Poor Law Act 1897 (repealed)	60 & 61 Vict. c. 29	6 August 1897
An Act to amend the Law with respect to the borrowing of Money by Guardians and Managers of District Schools and Asylums, and to explain the Metropolitan Poor Act, 1867. (Note: Metropolitan Poor Act 1867 (30 & 31 Vict. c. 6)) (Repealed by Poor Law Act 1927 (17 & 18 Geo. 5. c. 14))
Police (Property) Act 1897	60 & 61 Vict. c. 30	6 August 1897
An Act to make further provision with respect to the Disposal of Property in the Possession of the Police. (Repealed for Northern Ireland by Police (Northern Ireland) Act 1998 (c. 32))
Cleansing of Persons Act 1897 (repealed)	60 & 61 Vict. c. 31	6 August 1897
An Act to permit Local Authorities to provide Cleansing and Disinfection for Persons infested with Vermin. (Repealed for England and Wales and Scotland by Statute Law Revision Act 1908 (8 Edw. 7. c. 49) and National Assistance Act 1948 (11 & 12 Geo. 6. c. 29), for England and Wales by Public Health Act 1936 (26 Geo. 5 & 1 Edw. 8. c. 49) and Public Health (London) Act 1936 (26 Geo. 5 & 1 Edw. 8. c. 50) and for Scotland by Local Government (Scotland) Act 1947 (10 & 11 Geo. 6. c. 43) and Public Health etc. (Scotland) Act 2008 (asp 5))
School Board Conference Act 1897 (repealed)	60 & 61 Vict. c. 32	6 August 1897
An Act to provide for Expenses incurred by School Boards in relation to School Board Conferences. (Repealed by Education Act 1918 (8 & 9 Geo. 5. c. 39))
Isle of Man (Church Building and New Parishes) Act 1897	60 & 61 Vict. c. 33	6 August 1897
An Act to remove doubts as to the applicability of the Church Building Acts and New Parishes Acts to the Isle of Man.
Municipal Elections (Scotland) Act 1897 (repealed)	60 & 61 Vict. c. 34	6 August 1897
An Act to enable Returning Officers at Municipal Elections in Scotland to take the use of certain rooms free of charge. (Repealed by Local Government (Scotland) Act 1947 (10 & 11 Geo. 6. c. 43))
Naval Works Act 1897 (repealed)	60 & 61 Vict. c. 35	6 August 1897
An Act to make further provision for the Construction of Works in the United Kingdom and elsewhere for the purposes of the Royal Navy. (Repealed by Statute Law Revision Act 1950 (14 Geo. 6. c. 6))
Out-door Relief (Ireland) Act 1897 (repealed)	60 & 61 Vict. c. 36	6 August 1897
An Act to make temporary provision for the Relief of Distress in Ireland. (Repealed by Statute Law Revision Act 1908 (8 Edw. 7. c. 49))
Workmen's Compensation Act 1897 (repealed)	60 & 61 Vict. c. 37	6 August 1897
An Act to amend the Law with respect to Compensation to Workmen for accidental Injuries suffered in the course of their Employment. (Repealed by Workmen's Compensation Act 1906 (6 Edw. 7. c. 58))
Public Health (Scotland) Act 1897	60 & 61 Vict. c. 38	6 August 1897
An Act to consolidate and amend the Laws relating to the Public Health in Scotland.
Yorkshire Coroners Act 1897 (repealed)	60 & 61 Vict. c. 39	6 August 1897
An Act to constitute the Ridings of Yorkshire separate Counties for all the purposes of the Coroners Acts. (Repealed by Local Government Act 1972 (c. 70))
Local Government (Joint Committees) Act 1897 (repealed)	60 & 61 Vict. c. 40	6 August 1897
An Act to amend the Local Government Act, 1894, (Note: Local Government Act 1894 (56 & 57 Vict. c. 73)) with regard to Joint Committees for the purposes of the Burial Acts. (Repealed by Local Government Act 1972 (c. 70))
Post Office and Telegraph Act 1897 (repealed)	60 & 61 Vict. c. 41	6 August 1897
An Act to make provision with respect to the Delivery of Telegrams, Guarantees by Parish Councils in Scotland, and the Pensions of certain Persons employed in the Telegraph Service. (Repealed by Telegraph Act 1954 (2 & 3 Eliz. 2. c. 28))
Metropolitan Police (Borrowing Powers) Act 1897 (repealed)	60 & 61 Vict. c. 42	6 August 1897
An Act to extend the powers of the Receiver for the Metropolitan Police District. (Repealed by Metropolitan Magistrates' Courts Act 1959 (7 & 8 Eliz. 2. c. 45))
Military Manoeuvres Act 1897 (repealed)	60 & 61 Vict. c. 43	6 August 1897
An Act to facilitate Military Manoeuvres. (Repealed for Northern Ireland by Land Powers (Defence) Act 1958 (6 & 7 Eliz. 2. c. 30) and for England and Wales and Scotland by Manœuvres Act 1958 (7 & 8 Eliz. 2. c. 7))
District Councils (Water Supply Facilities) Act 1897	60 & 61 Vict. c. 44	6 August 1897
An Act for giving facilities for a pure water supply in rural districts.
Archdeaconry of London (Additional Endowment) Act 1897	60 & 61 Vict. c. 45	6 August 1897
An Act to make further provision for the Endowment of the Archdeaconry of London.
Weights and Measures (Metric System) Act 1897 or the Weights and Measures (Metric) Act 1897 or the Weights and Measures Act 1897 (repealed)	60 & 61 Vict. c. 46	6 August 1897
An Act to legalise the Use of Weights and Measures of the Metric System. (Repealed by Weights and Measures Act 1963 (c. 31))
Volunteer Act 1897 (repealed)	60 & 61 Vict. c. 47	6 August 1897
An Act to declare the Effect of the Provisions of the Volunteer Act, 1863, (Note: Volunteer Act 1863 (26 & 27 Vict. c. 65)) with respect to Rules for Volunteer Corps. (Repealed by Statute Law Revision Act 1966 (c. 5))
Stipendiary Magistrates Jurisdiction (Scotland) Act 1897 (repealed)	60 & 61 Vict. c. 48	6 August 1897
An Act to extend the Jurisdiction of Stipendiary Magistrates in Scotland. (Repealed by District Courts (Scotland) Act 1975 (c. 20))
Parish Councils Casual Vacancies (Scotland) Act 1897 (repealed)	60 & 61 Vict. c. 49	6 August 1897
An Act to make better provision for filling up Casual Vacancies in Parish Councils in Scotland. (Repealed by Local Government (Scotland) Act 1929 (19 & 20 Geo. 5. c. 25))
Licensing Amendment (Scotland) Act 1897 (repealed)	60 & 61 Vict. c. 50	6 August 1897
An Act to amend the Licensing (Scotland) Acts, 1828 to 1887. (Repealed by Licensing (Scotland) Act 1903 (3 Edw. 7. c. 25))
Public Works Loans Act 1897 (repealed)	60 & 61 Vict. c. 51	6 August 1897
An Act to grant Moneys for the purpose of certain Local Loans, and to amend the Law respecting the Local Loans Fund and Loans made thereout, and for other purposes relating to Local Loans. (Repealed by National Loans Act 1968 (c. 13))
Dangerous Performances Act 1897 (repealed)	60 & 61 Vict. c. 52	6 August 1897
An Act to extend the Age under which the Employment of Young Persons in dangerous Performances is prohibited. (Repealed for England and Wales by Children and Young Persons Act 1932 (22 & 23 Geo. 5. c. 46), for Scotland by Children and Young Persons (Scotland) Act 1932 (22 & 23 Geo. 5. c. 47) and for Northern Ireland by Children and Young Persons Act (Northern Ireland) 1950 (c. 5 (N.I.)))
Congested Districts (Scotland) Act 1897	60 & 61 Vict. c. 53	6 August 1897
An Act to provide for the administration of sums available for the improvement of congested districts in the Highlands and Islands of Scotland.
Expiring Laws Continuance Act 1897 (repealed)	60 & 61 Vict. c. 54	6 August 1897
An Act to continue various Expiring Laws. (Repealed by Statute Law Revision Act 1908 (8 Edw. 7. c. 49))
Wicklow Harbour Advances Act 1897	60 & 61 Vict. c. 55	6 August 1897
An Act to make provision with respect to Advances for the benefit of Wicklow Harbour.
Metropolis Water Act 1897	60 & 61 Vict. c. 56	6 August 1897
An Act to amend the Law respecting the Metropolitan Water Companies.
Infant Life Protection Act 1897 (repealed)	60 & 61 Vict. c. 57	6 August 1897
An Act to amend the Law for the better Protection of Infant Life. (Repealed by Children Act 1908 (8 Edw. 7. c. 67))
Cotton Cloth Factories Act 1897 (repealed)	60 & 61 Vict. c. 58	6 August 1897
An Act to give power to make Regulations with respect to Cotton Cloth Factories. (Repealed by Factory and Workshop Act 1901 (1 Edw. 7. c. 22))
Merchant Shipping Act 1897 (repealed)	60 & 61 Vict. c. 59	6 August 1897
An Act to amend the Merchant Shipping Act, 1894, (Note: Merchant Shipping Act 1894 (57 & 58 Vict. c. 60)) with respect to the Power of Detention for undermanning. (Repealed by Merchant Shipping Act 1995 (c. 21))
Chaff-Cutting Machines (Accidents) Act 1897 (repealed)	60 & 61 Vict. c. 60	6 August 1897
An Act for the Prevention of Accidents by Chaff-Cutting Machines. (Repealed for England and Wales and Scotland by Agriculture (Safety, Health and Welfare Provisions) Act 1956 (4 & 5 Eliz. 2. c. 49) and for Northern Ireland by Agriculture (Safety, Health and Welfare Provisions) Act (Northern Ireland) 1959 (c. 24 (N.I.)))
Merchant Shipping (Exemption from Pilotage) Act 1897 (repealed)	60 & 61 Vict. c. 61	6 August 1897
An Act to remove certain Exemptions from Compulsory Pilotage. (Repealed by Pilotage Act 1913 (2 & 3 Geo. 5. c. 31))
Education (Scotland) Act 1897 (repealed)	60 & 61 Vict. c. 62	6 August 1897
An Act to amend the provisions of Section Sixty-seven of the Education (Scotland) Act, 1872, (Note: Education (Scotland) Act 1872 (35 & 36 Vict. c. 62)) in regard to the additional grant to School Boards, and to provide out of the Exchequer an aid grant for Voluntary Schools in Scotland, and for the Exemption from Bates of those Schools. (Repealed by Education (Scotland) Act 1945 (8 & 9 Geo. 6. c. 37))
Foreign Prison-Made Goods Act 1897	60 & 61 Vict. c. 63	6 August 1897
An Act to prohibit the Importation of Foreign Prison-made goods.
Constabulary (Ireland) Act 1897 (repealed)	60 & 61 Vict. c. 64	6 August 1897
An Act to amend Sections Pour and Eight of the Constabulary (Ireland) Amendment Act, 1865. (Note: Constabulary (Ireland) Amendment Act 1865 (28 & 29 Vict. c. 70)) (Repealed by Statute Law Revision Act 1908 (8 Edw. 7. c. 49))
Land Transfer Act 1897 (repealed)	60 & 61 Vict. c. 65	6 August 1897
An Act to establish a Real Representative, and to amend the Land Transfer Act, 1875. (Note: Land Transfer Act 1875 (38 & 39 Vict. c. 87)) (Repealed by Law of Property (Amendment) Act 1924 (15 & 16 Geo. 5. c. 5) and Land Registration Act 1925 (15 & 16 Geo. 5. c. 21))
Supreme Court of Judicature (Ireland) (No. 2) Act 1897 (repealed)	60 & 61 Vict. c. 66	6 August 1897
An Act to amend the Judicature (Ireland) Acts, 1877 to 1888; and to provide for the union and consolidation of the Court of Bankruptcy in Ireland with the Supreme Court; and for other purposes connected therewith. (Repealed by Judicature (Northern Ireland) Act 1978 (c. 23))
Appropriation Act 1897 (repealed)	60 & 61 Vict. c. 67	6 August 1897
An Act to apply a sura out of the Consolidated Fund to the service of the year ending on the thirty-first day of March one thousand eight hundred and ninety-eight, and to appropriate the Supplies granted in this Session of Parliament. (Repealed by Statute Law Revision Act 1908 (8 Edw. 7. c. 49))

=== Local acts ===
Short title	Citation	Royal assent
Long title
London (Borough Road Southwark) Provisional Order Confirmation Act 1897	60 & 61 Vict. c. i	29 March 1897
An Act to confirm a Provision Order made by one of Her Majesty's Principal Secretaries of State under the Housing of the Working Classes Act 1890 (Note: Housing of the Working Classes Act 1890 (53 & 54 Vict. c. 70)) relating to Lands in the Parish of St. George the Martyr Southwark.
	Order to enable the London County Council to put in force the powers of the Lands Clauses Acts with respect to the purchase and taking of land otherwise than by agreement for the purposes of Part III of the Housing of the Working Classes Act 1890.	
London (Churchway St. Pancras) Provisional Order Confirmation Act 1897	60 & 61 Vict. c. ii	29 March 1897
An Act to confirm a Provisional Order made by one of Her Majesty’s Principal Secretaries of State for improving an Area situated in the Parish of St. Pancras in the County of London.
	London (Churchway St. Pancras) Order 1897 London (Churchway St. Pancras) Improvement Scheme 1895.	
Metropolitan Police Provisional Order Confirmation Act 1897 (repealed)	60 & 61 Vict. c. iii	29 March 1897
An Act to confirm a Provisional Order made by one of Her Majesty’s Principal Secretaries of State under the Metropolitan Police Act 1886 (Note: Metropolitan Police Act 1886 (49 & 50 Vict. c. 22)) relating to lands in the Parish of St. James Westminster. (Repealed by Statute Law (Repeals) Act 2008 (c. 12))
	Order made by the Secretary of State under the Metropolitan Police Act 1886.	
Local Government Board's Provisional Orders Confirmation (No. 1) Act 1897	60 & 61 Vict. c. iv	8 April 1897
An Act to confirm certain Provisional Orders of the Local Government Board relating to Leyton and Walton upon Thames.
	Leyton Order 1896 (Note: Although passed in 1897, the short title is specified as the Leyton Order 1896.) Provisional Order to enable the Urban District Council of Leyton to put in force the Compulsory Clauses of the Lands Clauses Acts.	
	Walton upon Thames Order 1896 (Note: Although passed in 1897, the short title is specified as the Walton upon Thames Order 1896.) Provisional Order to enable the Urban District Council of Walton upon Thames to put in force the Compulsory Clauses of the Lands Clauses Acts.	
South Metropolitan Gas Act 1897	60 & 61 Vict. c. v	8 April 1897
An Act to alter the Qualification for Directors of the South Metropolitan Gas Company.
Crays Gas Act 1897 (repealed)	60 & 61 Vict. c. vi	8 April 1897
An Act for the granting of further powers to the Crays Gas Company. (Repealed by South Suburban Gas Act 1928 (18 & 19 Geo. 5. c. lxxx))
Dunbarton County Buildings Act 1897	60 & 61 Vict. c. vii	8 April 1897
An Act to enable the County Council of the County of Dunbarton to borrow money for the purpose of erecting and enlarging County Buildings and for other purposes.
South Yorkshire Junction Railway Act 1897	60 & 61 Vict. c. viii	8 April 1897
An Act for the abandonment of parts of the Railways authorised by the South Yorkshire Junction Railway Act 1890, (Note: South Yorkshire Junction Railway Act 1890 (53 & 54 Vict. c. ccxiii)) and for other purposes.
Edinburgh American Land Mortgage Company Act 1897	60 & 61 Vict. c. ix	8 April 1897
An Act to enable the Edinburgh American Land Mortgage Company Limited to convert their present uncalled Capital into Preference Stock and for other purposes.
Aberbrothwick Harbour Finance Act 1897	60 & 61 Vict. c. x	3 June 1897
An Act for enabling the Trustees of the Harbour of Aberbrothwick to reconstruct their finances and to create and issue stocks for compounding their existing debts and for other purposes.
Whiting's Patent Act 1897	60 & 61 Vict. c. xi	3 June 1897
An Act for rendering valid certain Letters Patent granted to William John Whiting for Improvements in Revolver Firearms.
Great Western Railway (Truro and Newquay Railway) Act 1897	60 & 61 Vict. c. xii	3 June 1897
An Act to empower the Great Western Railway Company to make new railways in the county of Cornwall and for other purposes.
Provident Life Office Act 1897	60 & 61 Vict. c. xiii	3 June 1897
An Act to confer on the Provident Life Office further powers with respect to the accumulation and distribution of profits and for other purposes.
Railway Passengers Assurance Act 1897 (repealed)	60 & 61 Vict. c. xiv	3 June 1897
An Act to extend the objects and business of the Railway Passengers Assurance Company and for other purposes. (Repealed by Railway Passengers Assurance (Consolidation) Act 1918 (8 & 9 Geo. 5. c. xiv))
North London Commercial Permanent Building Society Act 1897	60 & 61 Vict. c. xv	3 June 1897
An Act to make provision with reference to the winding up of the North London Commercial Permanent Building Society.
St. Patrick's Park (Dublin) Act 1897	60 & 61 Vict. c. xvi	3 June 1897
An Act to authorise the making and laying out of a new Park in the City of Dublin to be called Saint Patrick's Park to vest the Park in the Lord Mayor Aldermen and Burgesses of the city with power to maintain and regulate the same and for other purposes.
Assam Railways and Trading Company Act 1897 (repealed)	60 & 61 Vict. c. xvii	3 June 1897
An Act to provide for the distribution of surplus capital of the Assam Railways and Trading Company Limited and for other purposes. (Repealed by Statute Law (Repeals) Act 2013 (c. 2))
London Bank of Australia Limited Act 1897	60 & 61 Vict. c. xviii	3 June 1897
An Act to enable certain alterations to be made in the Scheme of Arrangement of the affairs of the London Bank of Australia Limited and for other purposes.
Mason's Orphanage Act 1897 (repealed)	60 & 61 Vict. c. xix	3 June 1897
An Act for rendering valid certain Leases Sales and Conveyances made by the Trustees of Sir Josiah Mason's Almshouses and Orphanage without the consent of the Charity Commissioners. (Repealed by Statute Law (Repeals) Act 2013 (c. 2))
Mason University College Act 1897 (repealed)	60 & 61 Vict. c. xx	3 June 1897
An Act for incorporating Mason University College and for other purposes. (Repealed by Birmingham University Act 1900 (63 & 64 Vict. c. xix))
Mumbles Railway and Pier Act 1897 (repealed)	60 & 61 Vict. c. xxi	3 June 1897
An Act to extend the time for the construction and completion of the Pier authorised by the Mumbles Railway and Pier Act 1889. (Note: Mumbles Railway and Pier Act 1889 (52 & 53 Vict. c. cxciv)) (Repealed by South Wales Transport Act 1959 (7 & 8 Eliz. 2. c. l))
Neath Harbour Act 1897	60 & 61 Vict. c. xxii	3 June 1897
An Act to extend the time for the completion of the authorised Works for enlarging and improving the Port and Harbour of Neath.
Torquay Corporation Water Act 1897	60 & 61 Vict. c. xxiii	3 June 1897
An Act to empower the Corporation of the Borough of Torquay to acquire lands for the purposes of their Water Undertaking and for other purposes.
Craigcrook Mortification Act 1897	60 & 61 Vict. c. xxiv	3 June 1897
An Act for incorporating the Trustees of the Deed of Mortification by the deceased John Strachan of Craigcrook Writer to the Signet for enlarging the powers of the Trustees and for other purposes.
Crichton Royal Institution Act 1897	60 & 61 Vict. c. xxv	3 June 1897
An Act to re-constitute and to re-incorporate the Governing Body of the Crichton Royal Institution and for other purposes.
Huddersfield Corporation Act 1897	60 & 61 Vict. c. xxvi	3 June 1897
An Act to enable the Mayor Aldermen and Burgesses of the County Borough of Huddersfield to work their Tramways to construct street and road improvements and to make further provision for the good government of the Borough and for other purposes.
Dumfries and Maxwelltown Waterworks (Additional Powers) Act 1897	60 & 61 Vict. c. xxvii	3 June 1897
An Act for granting additional powers to the Dumfries and Maxwelltown Waterworks Commissioners and for other purposes.
Loughborough Corporation Act 1897	60 & 61 Vict. c. xxviii	3 June 1897
An Act to confer further powers upon the Mayor Aldermen and Burgesses of the Borough of Loughborough with respect to their Water Undertaking and for other purposes.
Taunton Gas Act 1897	60 & 61 Vict. c. xxix	3 June 1897
An Act for granting further powers to the Taunton Gas Light and Coke Company.
Wigan Junction Railways (Capital) Act 1897	60 & 61 Vict. c. xxx	3 June 1897
An Act to enable the Wigan Junction Railways Company to raise further capital and for other purposes.
Clyde Navigation Act 1897	60 & 61 Vict. c. xxxi	3 June 1897
An Act to extend the periods limited by the Clyde Navigation Act 1894 for the Compulsory Purchase of Lands and for the completion of the railway authorised by the Clyde Navigation Act 1891. (Note: Clyde Navigation Act 1891 (54 & 55 Vict. c. xxxviii))
Edinburgh Corporation Act 1897 (repealed)	60 & 61 Vict. c. xxxii	3 June 1897
An Act to authorise the Lord Provost Magistrates and Council of the City of Edinburgh to widen and improve Streets to construct new Tramways to acquire Tramways by agreement to provide a new Fire Brigade Station to acquire Lands to transfer the Portobello Gasworks to the Edinburgh and Leith Corporations Gas Commissioners to confer further powers on the said Commissioners to amend Acts and for other purposes. (Repealed by Edinburgh Corporation Order Confirmation Act 1933 (24 & 25 Geo. 5. c. v))
Great Eastern Railway (Lowestoft Harbour) Act 1897	60 & 61 Vict. c. xxxiii	3 June 1897
An Act to authorise the Great Eastern Railway Company to construct additional works in connexion with Lowestoft Harbour and for other purposes.
Bray and Enniskerry Railway Act 1897	60 & 61 Vict. c. xxxiv	3 June 1897
An Act to extend the period for the completion of the railway authorised by the Bray and Enniskerry Light Railway Act 1886 (Note: Bray and Enniskerry Light Railway Act 1886 (49 & 50 Vict. c. xii)) and for other purposes.
South Western (Meon Valley) Railway Act 1897 or the South Western Railway (Meon Valley) Act 1897	60 & 61 Vict. c. xxxv	3 June 1897
An Act for enabling the London and South Western Railway Company to construct new Railways and to widen their Farnham Alton and Winchester Railway in the county of Southampton and for other purposes.
Bristol Tramways Act 1897	60 & 61 Vict. c. xxxvi	3 June 1897
An Act to authorise the Bristol Tramways and Carriage Company Limited to extend their Tramways and to confer further powers upon that Company.
Richmond District Asylum Act 1897	60 & 61 Vict. c. xxxvii	3 June 1897
An Act to empower the Governors of the Richmond District Lunatic Asylum to borrow money and to create and issue Stock and for other purposes.
Tynemouth Gas Act 1897	60 & 61 Vict. c. xxxviii	3 June 1897
An Act to empower the Tynemouth Gas Company to raise Additional Capital and for other purposes.
Charing Cross, Euston and Hampstead Railway Act 1897	60 & 61 Vict. c. xxxix	3 June 1897
An Act to revive and extend the powers of the Charing Cross Euston and Hampstead Railway Company and for other purposes.
Great Northern Railway Act 1897	60 & 61 Vict. c. xl	3 June 1897
An Act to confer further powers upon the Great Northern Railway Company with respect to their own and other undertakings to provide for the incorporation of a Joint Committee of the Great Northern Railway Company and the Manchester Sheffield and Lincolnshire Railway Company the vesting in that Committee of an authorised Passenger Station at Nottingham and for other purposes.
London and North Western Railway (Wales) Act 1897	60 & 61 Vict. c. xli	3 June 1897
An Act for conferring further powers upon the London and North Western Railway Company in relation to their Chester and Holyhead Railway and for other purposes.
Epsom Downs Extension Railway Act 1897	60 & 61 Vict. c. xlii	3 June 1897
An Act for conferring further powers on the Epsom Downs Extension Railway Company for the construction of works and otherwise in relation to their undertaking and for other purposes.
Weymouth Consumers Gas Act 1897	60 & 61 Vict. c. xliii	3 June 1897
An Act for extending the limits of supply of the Weymouth Consumers Gas Company and for conferring further powers on the Company for the raising of money and otherwise in relation to their undertaking and for other purposes.
Devonport Waterworks Act 1897	60 & 61 Vict. c. xliv	3 June 1897
An Act for repealing certain provisions of the Devonport Waterworks Act 1893 (Note: Devonport Waterworks Act 1893 (56 & 57 Vict. c. lxxii)) and for conferring further powers on the Devonport Water Company for the construction of works and otherwise in relation to their undertaking and for other purposes.
Glasgow Harbour Tunnel (Further Powers) Act 1897 (repealed)	60 & 61 Vict. c. xlv	3 June 1897
An Act to authorise the Glasgow Harbour Tunnel Company to raise additional capital to confer on them further powers with reference to their surplus lands and properties and for other purposes. (Repealed by Glasgow Corporation Order Confirmation Act 1927 (17 & 18 Geo. 5. c. lix))
Birmingham Tame and Rea District Drainage Board Act 1897	60 & 61 Vict. c. xlvi	3 June 1897
An Act to authorise the Birmingham Tame and Rea District Drainage Board to acquire lands and construct works for sewage and drainage purposes to borrow moneys and for other purposes.
Chichester Corporation Water Act 1897 (repealed)	60 & 61 Vict. c. xlvii	3 June 1897
An Act to authorise the Mayor Aldermen and Citizens of the city of Chichester to purchase the undertaking of the Chichester Waterworks Company and to supply water throughout the city and adjoining places. (Repealed by Portsmouth & Gosport Water (Regnum Area) Order 1963 (SI 1963/1333))
Great Eastern Railway (New Lines in Norfolk and Suffolk) Act 1897	60 & 61 Vict. c. xlviii	3 June 1897
An Act for enabling the Great Eastern Railway Company to construct new Railways in the counties of Norfolk and Suffolk and for other purposes.
Perth Harbour City Improvements and Gas Act 1897	60 & 61 Vict. c. xlix	3 June 1897
An Act to authorise the construction of a Quay at the Harbour of Perth and a Bridge over the River Tay and other Works and also new Gasworks to make provision for the regulation of the office of Town Clerk and for other purposes.
Plymouth Corporation Act 1897 (repealed)	60 & 61 Vict. c. l	3 June 1897
An Act to empower the Corporation of Plymouth to acquire Lary Bridge to extend the Boundary of the Borough and for other purposes. (Repealed by Plymouth City Council Act 1987 (c. iv))
Cowes Urban District Council Gas Act 1897	60 & 61 Vict. c. li	3 June 1897
An Act to provide for the transfer of the undertaking of the Cowes Gas Company to the Cowes Urban District Council and to authorise the Council to supply Gas and for other purposes.
Ashford Urban District Gas Act 1897	60 & 61 Vict. c. lii	3 June 1897
An Act to authorise the Ashford Urban District Council to supply Gas and to provide for the transfer of the undertaking of the Ashford Gas and Coke Company Limited to the said Council and for other purposes.
London and North Western Railway Act 1897	60 & 61 Vict. c. liii	3 June 1897
An Act for conferring further powers upon the London and North Western Railway Company in relation to their own undertaking and other undertakings in which they are interested jointly with other Companies and for other purposes.
Great Central Railway Act 1897	60 & 61 Vict. c. liv	3 June 1897
An Act to enable the Manchester Sheffield and Lincolnshire Railway Company to make new Railways to confer further powers upon that Company the Cheshire Lines Committee and the North Wales and Liverpool Railway Committee to make further provision with reference to a Joint Station at Nottingham with the Great Northern Railway Company to alter the name of the Company to provide for the conversion of the Company's Ordinary Stock and for other purposes.
Neath Corporation Tramways Act 1897	60 & 61 Vict. c. lv	3 June 1897
An Act to empower the Mayor Aldermen and Burgesses of the Borough of Neath in the County of Glamorgan to purchase the Tramway Undertaking authorised by the Neath and District Tramways Order 1873 to construct additional Tramways and for other purposes.
Lancashire, Derbyshire and East Coast Railway Act 1897	60 & 61 Vict. c. lvi	3 June 1897
An Act to authorise the Lancashire Derbyshire and East Coast Railway Company to construct Branch Railways acquire additional Lands and raise additional Capital in connexion with their Chesterfield and Lincoln Separate Undertaking and for other purposes.
Local Government Board (Ireland) Provisional Orders Confirmation (No. 1) Act 1897	60 & 61 Vict. c. lvii	3 June 1897
An Act to confirm Provisional Orders made by the Local Government Board for Ireland under the Public Health (Ireland) Act 1878 (Note: Public Health (Ireland) Act 1878 (41 & 42 Vict. c. 52)) relating to the Urban Sanitary District of Kilkenny and the Rural Sanitary District of Scariff.
	Kilkenny Waterworks. Provisional Order.	
	Scariff Union—Scariff Waterworks. Provisional Order.	
Paisley Waterworks Provisional Order Confirmation Act 1897	60 & 61 Vict. c. lviii	3 June 1897
An Act to confirm a Provisional Order under the Burgh Police (Scotland) Act 1892 (Note: Burgh Police (Scotland) Act 1892 (55 & 56 Vict. c. 55)) relating to Paisley Waterworks.
	Provisional Order.	
London (Clare Market Strand) Provisional Order Confirmation Act 1897	60 & 61 Vict. c. lix	3 June 1897
An Act to confirm a Provisional Order made by One of Her Majesty’s Principal Secretaries of State for improving an Area situated in the Parishes of St. Mary-le-Strand St. Clement Danes St. Giles-in-the-Fields and St. Martin-in-the-Fields, in the County of London.
	London (Clare Market Strand) Improvement Scheme 1897 Scheme for the improvement of certain lands within the Metropolis situate in the parishes of St. Clement Danes St. Mary-le-Strand St. Giles-in-the-Fields and St. Martin-in-the-Fields in the county of London in pursuance of the Housing of the Working Classes Act 1890.	
Clackmannan (Alloa and Tillicoultry) Water Order Confirmation Act 1897	60 & 61 Vict. c. lx	3 June 1897
An Act to confirm a Provisional Order under the Public Health (Scotland) Act 1867 (Note: Public Health (Scotland) Act 1867 (30 & 31 Vict. c. 101)) and the Acts amending the same relating to Clackmannan (Alloa and Tillicoultry) Water Supply.
	Clackmannan (Alloa and Tillicoultry) Water Order 1897 Provisional Order.	
Electric Lighting Orders Confirmation (No. 1) Act 1897	60 & 61 Vict. c. lxi	15 July 1897
An Act to confirm certain Provisional Orders made by the Board of Trade under the Electric Lighting Acts 1882 (Note: Electric Lighting Act 1882 (45 & 46 Vict. c. 56)) and 1888 (Note: Electric Lighting Act 1888 (51 & 52 Vict. c. 12)) relating to Garston Hoylake and West Kirby Ipswich Morley Wilmslow and Wrexham.
	Garston Electric Lighting Order 1897 Provisional Order granted by the Board of Trade under the Electric Lighting Acts 1882 and 1888 to the Urban District Council of Garston in respect of the Urban District of Garston.	
	Hoylake and West Kirby Electric Lighting Order 1897 Provisional Order granted by the Board of Trade under the Electric Lighting Acts 1882 and 1888 to the Urban District Council of Hoylake and West Kirby in respect of the Urban District of Hoylake and West Kirby.	
	Ipswich Corporation Electric Lighting Order 1897 Provisional Order granted by the Board of Trade under the Electric Lighting Acts 1882 and 1888 to the Mayor Aldermen and Burgesses of the Borough of Ipswich in respect of the said Borough.	
	Morley Corporation Electric Lighting Order 1897 Provisional Order granted by the Board of Trade under the Electric Lighting Acts 1882 and 1888 to the Mayor Aldermen and Burgesses of the Borough of Morley in respect of the said Borough.	
	Wilmslow Electric Lighting Order 1897 Provisional Order granted by the Board of Trade under the Electric Lighting Acts 1882 and 1888 to the Wilmslow Urban District Council in respect of the Urban District of Wilmslow.	
	Wrexham Corporation Electric Lighting Order 1897 Provisional Order granted by the Board of Trade under the Electric Lighting Acts 1882 and 1888 to the Mayor Aldermen and Burgesses of the Borough of Wrexham in respect of the said Borough.	
Electric Lighting Orders Confirmation (No. 2) Act 1897	60 & 61 Vict. c. lxii	15 July 1897
An Act to confirm certain Provisional Orders made by the Board of Trade under the Electric Lighting Acts 1882 and 1888 relating to Darwen Dundalk Lincoln Tonbridge Vent nor and Wimbledon.
	Darwen Corporation Electric Lighting Order 1897 Provisional Order granted by the Board of Trade under the Electric Lighting Acts 1882 and 1888 to the Mayor Aldermen and Burgesses of the Borough of Darwen in respect of the Borough of Darwen.	
	Dundalk Electric Lighting Order 1897 Provisional Order granted by the Board of Trade under the Electric Lighting Acts 1882 and 1888 to the Dundalk Town Commissioners in the County of Louth.	
	Lincoln Electric Lighting Order 1897 Provisional Order granted by the Board of Trade under the Electric Lighting Acts 1882 and 1888 to the Mayor Aldermen and Citizens of the City of Lincoln acting as the Urban Sanitary Authority under the Public Health Act 1875 (Note: Public Health Act 1875 (38 & 39 Vict. c. 55)) in respect of the City of Lincoln and the County of the same City.	
	Tonbridge Electric Lighting Order 1897 Provisional Order granted by the Board of Trade under the Electric Lighting Acts 1882 and 1888 to the Urban District Council of Tonbridge in respect of the Urban District of Tonbridge in the County of Kent.	
	Ventnor Electric Lighting Order 1897 Provisional Order granted by the Board of Trade under the Electric Lighting Acts 1882 and 1888 to the Ventnor District Council in respect of the Urban District of Ventnor.	
	Wimbledon Electric Lighting Order 1897 Provisional Order granted by the Board of Trade under the Electric Lighting Acts 1882 and 1888 to the Urban District Council of Wimbledon in the County of Surrey in respect of the Urban District of Wimbledon.	
Electric Lighting Orders Confirmation (No. 3) Act 1897	60 & 61 Vict. c. lxiii	15 July 1897
An Act to confirm certain Provisional Orders made by the Board of Trade under the Electric Lighting Acts 1882 and 1888 relating to Brighouse Bury St. Edmunds Dudley Farnworth Kearsley Southampton and Watford.
	Brighouse Corporation Electric Lighting Order 1897 Provisional Order granted by the Board of Trade under the Electric Lighting Acts 1882 and 1888 to the Mayor Aldermen and Burgesses of the Borough of Brighouse in respect of the said Borough.	
	Bury Saint Edmund's Electric Lighting Order 1897 Provisional Order granted by the Board of Trade under the Electric Lighting Acts 1882 and 1888 to the Mayor Aldermen and Burgesses of the Borough of Bury Saint Edmund's in respect of the Borough of Bury Saint Edmund's in the County of Suffolk.	
	Dudley Corporation Electric Lighting Order 1897 Provisional Order granted by the Board of Trade under the Electric Lighting Acts 1882 and 1888 to the Mayor Aldermen and Burgesses of the Borough of Dudley in respect of the said Borough.	
	Farnworth Electric Lighting Order 1897 Provisional Order granted by the Board of Trade under the Electric Lighting Acts 1882 and 1888 to the Urban District Council of Farnworth in respect of the District of Farnworth in the County of Lancaster.	
	Kearsley Electric Lighting Order 1897 Provisional Order granted by the Board of Trade under the Electric Lighting Acts 1882 and 1888 to the Urban District Council of Kearsley in respect of the Urban District of Kearsley in the County of Lancaster.	
	Southampton Electric Lighting Order 1897 Provisional Order granted by the Board of Trade under the Electric Lighting Acts 1882 and 1888 to the Mayor Aldermen and Burgesses of the County Borough of Southampton for extending their area of supply.	
	Watford Electric Lighting Order 1897 Provisional Order granted by the Board of Trade under the Electric Lighting Acts 1882 and 1888 to the Urban District Council of Watford in respect of the Urban District of Watford.	
Electric Lighting Order Confirmation (No. 4) Act 1897 (repealed)	60 & 61 Vict. c. lxiv	15 July 1897
An Act to confirm a Provisional Order made by the Board of Trade under the Electric Lighting Acts 1882 to 1890 relating to Leith. (Repealed by South of Scotland Electricity Order Confirmation Act 1956 (4 & 5 Eliz. 2. c. xciv))
	Leith Corporation Electric Lighting Order 1897 Provisional Order granted by the Board of Trade under the Electric Lighting Acts 1882 to 1890 to the Provost Magistrates and Town Council of the Burgh of Leith in respect of the Burgh of Leith in the County of Midlothian.	
Electric Lighting Orders Confirmation (No. 5) Act 1897	60 & 61 Vict. c. lxv	15 July 1897
An Act to confirm certain Provisional Orders made by the Board of Trade under the Electric Lighting Acts 1882 and 1888 relating to Ambleside Ballymena Dorking Llandrindod Wells Redditch and Reigate.
	Ambleside Electric Lighting Order 1897 Provisional Order granted by the Board of Trade under the Electric Lighting Acts 1882 and 1888 to the Urban District Council of Ambleside in respect of the Urban District of Ambleside.	
	Ballymena Electric Lighting Order 1897 Provisional Order granted by the Board of Trade under the Electric Lighting Acts 1882 and 1888 to the Town Commissioners of Ballymena.	
	Dorking Electric Lighting Order 1897 Provisional Order granted by the Board of Trade under the Electric Lighting Acts 1882 and 1888 to the Dorking Urban District Council in respect of the Urban District of Dorking.	
	Llandrindod Wells Electric Lighting Order 1897 Provisional Order granted by the Board of Trade under the Electric Lighting Acts 1882 and 1888 to the Llandrindod Wells Electric Light and Power Company (Limited) in respect of the Urban District of Llandrindod Wells in the County of Radnor.	
	Redditch Electric Lighting Order 1897 Provisional Order granted by the Board of Trade under the Electric Lighting Acts 1882 and 1888 to the Urban District Council of Redditch in respect of the Urban District of Redditch in the County of Worcester.	
	Reigate Corporation Electric Lighting Order 1897 Provisional Order granted by the Board of Trade under the Electric Lighting Acts 1882 and 1888 to the Mayor Aldermen and Burgesses of the Borough of Reigate in respect of the Borough of Reigate.	
Electric Lighting Orders Confirmation (No. 6) Act 1897	60 & 61 Vict. c. lxvi	15 July 1897
An Act to confirm certain Provisional Orders made by the Board of Trade under the Electric Lighting Acts 1882 and 1888 relating to Barking Town Morecambe Ramsbottom Swadlincote and Wallasey.
	Barking Town Electric Lighting Order 1897 Provisional Order granted by the Board of Trade under the Electric Lighting Acts 1882 and 1888 to the Barking Town Urban District Council in respect of the Urban District of Barking Town in the County of Essex.	
	Morecambe Electric Lighting Order 1897 Provisional Order granted by the Board of Trade under the Electric Lighting Acts 1882 and 1888 to the Urban District Council of the Urban District of Morecambe in respect of the Urban District of Morecambe in the County of Lancaster.	
	Ramsbottom Electric Lighting Order 1897 Provisional Order granted by the Board of Trade under the Electric Lighting Acts 1882 and 1888 to the Urban District Council of Ramsbottom in respect of the Urban District of Ramsbottom.	
	Swadlincote Electric Lighting Order 1897 Provisional Order granted by the Board of Trade under the Electric Lighting Acts 1882 and 1888 to the Urban District Council of Swadlincote District in respect of the Urban District of Swadlincote District.	
	Wallasey Electric Lighting Order 1897 Provisional Order granted by the Board of Trade under the Electric Lighting Acts 1882 and 1888 to the Wallasey Urban District Council in respect of the Urban District of Wallasey.	
Berriew School Act 1897	60 & 61 Vict. c. lxvii	15 July 1897
An Act to annul an Order in Council confirming a Scheme relating to the Foundation known as the Berriew School.
Local Government Board's Provisional Orders Confirmation (No. 2) Act 1897	60 & 61 Vict. c. lxviii	15 July 1897
An Act to confirm certain Provisional Orders of the Local Government Board relating to Buxton Kingston-upon-Hull Plymouth Ramsgate (two) Southampton Southend-on-Sea Wallasey and West Ham.
	Buxton Order 1897 Provisional Order for altering a Local Act (Note: Buxton Local Board Act 1873 (36 & 37 Vict. c. lvi)) and certain Confirming Acts.	
	Kingston-upon-Hull Order 1897 Provisional Order for altering a Confirming Act. (Note: Local Government Board's Provisional Order Confirmation (No. 14) Act 1890 (53 & 54 Vict. c. cciii))	
	Plymouth Order (No. 2) 1897 Provisional Order for altering certain Local Acts.	
	Ramsgate Order 1897 Provisional Order for altering a Local Act (Note: Ramsgate Improvement Act 1838 (1 & 2 Vict. c. lxx)) and certain Confirming Acts.	
	Ramsgate Order (No. 1) 1897 Provisional Order for altering the Ramsgate Local Board Act 1877. (Note: Ramsgate Local Board Act 1877 (40 & 41 Vict. c. cxix))	
	Southampton Order 1897 Provisional Order for altering a Confirming Act. (Note: Local Government Board's Provisional Orders Confirmation (No. 6) Act 1894 (57 & 58 Vict. c. xxiii))	
	Southend-on-Sea Order (No. 1) 1897 Provisional Order for altering the Southend-on-Sea Corporation Act 1895. (Note: Southend-on-Sea Corporation Act 1895 (58 & 59 Vict. c. clviii))	
	Wallasey Order 1897 Provisional Order for altering a Local Act (Note: Wallasey Improvement Act 1872 (35 & 36 Vict. c. cxxv)) and certain Confirming Acts.	
	West Ham Order 1897 Provisional Order for partially repealing and altering certain Local Acts.	
Local Government Board's Provisional Orders Confirmation (No. 4) Act 1897	60 & 61 Vict. c. lxix	15 July 1897
An Act to confirm certain Provisional Orders of the Local Government Board relating to the Auckland-Shildon-and-Willington Bucklow Honley-and-South-Crosland and Wath-Swinton-Greasbrough-and-North-Rotherham United Districts.
	Auckland, Shildon and Willington Joint Hospital Order 1897 Provisional Order for forming a United District under Section 279 of the Public Health Act 1875.	
	Bucklow Joint Hospital Order 1897 Provisional Order for forming a United District under Section 279 of the Public Health Act 1875.	
	Honley and South Crosland Joint Sewerage Order 1897 Provisional Order for forming a United District under Section 279 of the Public Health Act 1875.	
	Wath, Swinton, Greasbrough and North Rotherham Joint Hospital Order 1897 Provisional Order for altering a Confirming Act. (Note: Local Government Board's Provisional Orders Confirmation (No. 11) Act 1895 (58 & 59 Vict. c. xc))	
Local Government Board's Provisional Orders Confirmation (No. 5) Act 1897	60 & 61 Vict. c. lxx	15 July 1897
An Act to confirm certain Provisional Orders of the Local Government Board relating to Bacup Burnley Middleton Rhyl and Tiverton.
	Bacup Order 1897 Provisional Order for altering certain Local Acts.	
	Burnley Order 1897 Provisional Order for altering certain Local Acts and Confirming Acts.	
	Middleton Order 1897 Provisional Order for altering a Local Act (Note: Middleton and Tonge Improvement Act 1861 (24 & 25 Vict. c. c)) and a Confirming Act. (Note: Local Government Board's Provisional Orders Confirmation (Cottingham, &c.) Act 1881 (44 & 45 Vict. c. lxx))	
	Rhyl Order 1897 Provisional Order for altering a Local Act. (Note: Rhyl Improvement Act 1852 (15 & 16 Vict. c. xxxii))	
	Tiverton Order 1897 Provisional Order for altering certain Confirming Acts.	
Local Government Board's Provisional Orders Confirmation (No. 6) Act 1897	60 & 61 Vict. c. lxxi	15 July 1897
An Act to confirm certain Provisional Orders of the Local Government Board relating to Ashby-de-la-Zouch Biggleswade (Rural) Bredbury-and-Romiley Carlisle (Rural) Cheadle-and-Gatley Cricklade-and-Wootton-Bassett (Rural) Exmouth Heston-and-Isleworth Liverpool Mailing (Rural) and Settle (Rural).
	Ashby-de-la-Zouche Order 1897 Provisional Order to enable the Urban District Council of Ashby-de-la-Zouch to put in force the Compulsory Clauses of the Lands Clauses Acts.	
	Biggleswade Rural Order 1897 Provisional Order to enable the Rural District Council of Biggleswade to put in force the Compulsory Clauses of the Lands Clauses Acts.	
	Bredbury and Romiley Order 1897 Provisional Order to enable the Urban District Council of Bredbury and Romiley to put in force the Compulsory Clauses of the Lands Clauses Acts.	
	Carlisle Rural Order 1897 Provisional Order to enable the Rural District Council of Carlisle to put in force the Compulsory Clauses of the Lands Clauses Acts.	
	Cheadle and Gatley Order 1897 Provisional Order to enable the Urban District Council of Cheadle and Gatley to put in force the Compulsory Clauses of the Lands Clauses Acts.	
	Cricklade and Wootton Bassett Rural Order 1897 Provisional Order to enable the Rural District Council of Cricklade and Wootton Bassett to put in force the Compulsory Clauses of the Lands Clauses Acts.	
	Exmouth Order 1897 Provisional Order to enable the Urban District Council of Exmouth to put in force the Compulsory Clauses of the Lands Clauses Acts.	
	Heston and Isleworth Order 1897 Provisional Order to enable the Urban District Council of Heston and Isleworth to put in force the Compulsory Clauses of the Lands Clauses Acts.	
	Liverpool Order 1897 Provisional Order to enable the Urban Sanitary Authority for the City of Liverpool to put in force the Compulsory Clauses of the Lands Clauses Acts.	
	Malling Rural Order 1897 Provisional Order to enable the Rural District Council of Malling to put in force the Compulsory Clauses of the Lands Clauses Acts.	
	Settle Rural Order 1897 Provisional Order to enable the Rural District Council of Settle to put in force the Compulsory Clauses of the Lands Clauses Acts.	
Local Government Board's Provisional Orders Confirmation (No. 7) Act 1897	60 & 61 Vict. c. lxxii	15 July 1897
An Act to confirm certain Provisional Orders of the Local Government Board relating to the Boroughs of Chelmsford Nelson Southend-on-Sea and West Bromwich.
	Borough of Chelmsford Extension Order 1897 Provisional Order made in pursuance of Sections 54 and 59 of the Local Government Act 1888. (Note: Local Government Act 1888 (51 & 52 Vict. c. 41))	
	Borough of Nelson Extension Order 1897 Provisional Order made in pursuance of Sections 54 and 59 of the Local Government Act 1888.	
	Borough of Southend-on-Sea Extension Order 1897 Provisional Order made in pursuance of Sections 54 and 59 of the Local Government Act 1888.	
	Borough of West Bromwich Order 1897 Provisional Order made in pursuance of Sections 54 and 59 of the Local Government Act 1888.	
Local Government Board's Provisional Orders Confirmation (No. 8) Act 1897	60 & 61 Vict. c. lxxiii	15 July 1897
An Act to confirm certain Provisional Orders of the. Local Government Board relating to the Counties of Buckingham and Stafford.
	County of Buckingham (Tickford and North Bridges) Order 1897 Provisional Order under Section 10 of the Local Government Act 1888.	
	Rocester Bridge Order 1897 Provisional Order under Section 10 of the Local Government Act 1888.	
Local Government Board's Provisional Orders Confirmation (No. 9) Act 1897	60 & 61 Vict. c. lxxiv	15 July 1897
An Act to confirm certain Provisional Orders of the Local Government Board relating to Bath (two) Leatherhead Luddenden-Foot New-Windsor Ogmore-and-Garw and WestHam.
	Bath Order (No. 1) 1897 Provisional Order to enable the Urban Sanitary Authority for the City of Bath to put in force the Compulsory Clauses of the Lands Clauses Acts.	
	Bath Order (No. 2) 1897 Provisional Order for altering a Local Act. (Note: Bath Act 1879 (42 & 43 Vict. c. lxii))	
	Leatherhead Order 1897 Provisional Order to enable the Urban District Council of Leatherhead to put in force the Compulsory Clauses of the Lands Clauses Acts.	
	Luddenden Foot Order 1897 Provisional Order to enable the Urban District Council of Luddenden Foot to put in force the Compulsory Clauses of the Lands Clauses Acts.	
	New Windsor Order 1897 Provisional Order to enable the Urban District Council for the Borough of New Windsor to put in force the Compulsory Clauses of the Lands Clauses Acts.	
	Ogmore and Garw Order 1897 Provisional Order to enable the Urban District Council of Ogmore and Garw to put in force the Compulsory Clauses of the Lands Clauses Acts.	
	West Ham Order (No. 2) 1897 Provisional Order to enable the Urban Sanitary Authority for the Borough of West Ham to put in force the Compulsory Clauses of the Lands Clauses Acts.	
Local Government Board's Provisional Orders Confirmation (No. 10) Act 1897 (repealed)	60 & 61 Vict. c. lxxv	15 July 1897
An Act to confirm certain Provisional Orders of the Local Government Board relating to the Counties of Bedford Denbigh Flint Hereford Hertford and Worcester. (Repealed by Statute Law (Repeals) Act 1998 (c. 43))
	Counties of Bedford and Hertford (Caddington &c.) Order 1897 Provisional Order made in pursuance of Section 54 of the Local Government Act 1888 for altering the Boundary between Counties.	
	County of Hertford (Holwell &c.) Order 1897 Provisional Order made in pursuance of Section 54 of the Local Government Act 1888 for altering the Boundary between Counties.	
	Counties of Denbigh and Flint (Erbistock &c.) Order 1897 Provisional Order made in pursuance of Section 54 of the Local Government Act 1888 for altering the Boundary between Counties.	
	Counties of Hereford and Worcester (Cradley) Order 1897 Provisional Order made in pursuance of Section 54 of the Local Government Act 1888 for altering the Boundary between Counties.	
	Hereford and Worcester (Acton Beauchamp Mathon Rural and Stoke Bliss) Order 1897 Provisional Order made in pursuance of Section 54 of the Local Government Act 1888 for altering the Boundary between Counties.	
Local Government Board's Provisional Order Confirmation (Gas) Act 1897 (repealed)	60 & 61 Vict. c. lxxvi	15 July 1897
An Act to confirm a Provisional Order of the Local Government Board under the Gas and Water Works Facilities Act 1870 (Note: Gas and Water Works Facilities Act 1870 (33 & 34 Vict. c. 70)) and the Public Health Act 1875 relating to Droitwich. (Repealed by Statute Law (Repeals) Act 1998 (c. 43))
	Droitwich Gas Order 1897 Provisional Order under the Gas and Water Works Facilities Act 1870 and the Gas and Water Works Facilities Act 1870 Amendment Act 1873. (Note: Gas and Water Works Facilities Act 1870 Amendment Act 1873)	
Local Government Board's Provisional Orders Confirmation (Poor Law) Act 1897 (repealed)	60 & 61 Vict. c. lxxvii	15 July 1897
An Act to confirm certain Provisional Orders of the Local Government Board relating to the Parishes of Saint George the Martyr Southwark and Saint James Westminster. (Repealed by London Government (Borough of Southwark) Order in Council 1901 (SR&O 1901/275) and London Government (City of Westminster) Order in Council 1901 (SR&O 1901/278))
	Saint George the Martyr Southwark Order 1897 Provisional Order for altering certain Local Acts. (Note: King's Bench Prison Poor Relief Act 1783 (23 Geo. 3. c. 23)) (Note: St. George the Martyr, Southwark, Parochial Rates Act 1810 (50 Geo. 3. c. xlv))	
	Saint James Westminster Order 1897 Provisional Order for partially repealing and altering a Local Act. (Note: St. James, Westminster (Poor Relief, etc.) Act 1762 (2 Geo. 3. c. 58))	
Pier and Harbour Orders Confirmation (No. 1) Act 1897	60 & 61 Vict. c. lxxviii	15 July 1897
An Act to confirm certain Provisional Orders made by the Board of Trade under the General Pier and Harbour Act 1861 (Note: General Pier and Harbour Act 1861 (24 & 25 Vict. c. 45)) relating to Anstruther Deal Hunstanton and St. Andrews.
	Anstruther Union Harbour Order 1897 Order for amending the Anstruther Union Harbour Order 1880 and conferring further powers on the Commissioners of that Harbour.	
	Deal Harbour Order 1897 Order for Reviving the powers of and extending the time for the construction of Works authorised by the Deal Harbour Order 1893.	
	Hunstanton Pier Order 1897 Order for amending the Hunstanton Pier Order 1868 and for authorising the Construction of further Works.	
	St. Andrews Harbour Order 1897 Order for the construction of Works at the Harbour of St. Andrews in the county of Fife and for the maintenance and regulation of the Harbour.	
Pier and Harbour Order Confirmation (No. 2) Act 1897	60 & 61 Vict. c. lxxix	15 July 1897
An Act to confirm a Provisional Order made by the Board of Trade under the General Pier and Harbour Act 1861 relating to Killala.
	Killala Pier Order 1897 Order for Reviving the powers of and Extending the time for the construction of the Works authorised by the Killala Pier Order 1892.	
Pier and Harbour Orders Confirmation (No. 5) Act 1897	60 & 61 Vict. c. lxxx	15 July 1897
An Act to confirm certain Provisional Orders made by the Board of Trade under the General Pier and Harbour Act 1861 relating to Ilfracombe Llandudno and Scrabster.
	Ilfracombe Harbour Order 1897 Order for the construction of further Works at Ilfracombe in the County of Devon.	
	Llandudno Victoria Pier Order 1897 Order for the Construction Maintenance and Regulation of a Pier and Works at Llandudno in the County of Carnarvon.	
	Scrabster Harbour Order 1897 Order for the construction of further Works at the Harbour of Scrabster in the county of Caithness and for the maintenance and regulation of the Harbour.	
Local Government Board (Ireland) Provisional Orders Confirmation (No. 2) Act 1897	60 & 61 Vict. c. lxxxi	15 July 1897
An Act to confirm Provisional Orders made by the Local Government Board for Ireland under the Public Health (Ireland) Act 1878 relating to the Sanitary Districts of Limavady and Carrickmacross.
	Limavady Town Provisional Order 1897 Town of Limavady. Provisional Order.	
	Carrickmacross Waterworks Provisional Order 1897 Carrickmacross Union.–Carrickmacross Waterworks. Provisional Order.	
Local Government Board (Ireland) Provisional Orders Confirmation (No. 3) Act 1897	60 & 61 Vict. c. lxxxii	15 July 1897
An Act to confirm certain Provisional Orders of the Local Government Board for Ireland relating to Limerick and Navan and the Unions of Roscommon and Midleton.
	Lurgan Town Provisional Order (No. 1) 1897 Provisional Order confirming an Improvement Scheme under Part I. of the Housing of the Working Classes Act 1890.	
	Lurgan Town Provisional Order (No. 2) 1897 Provisional Order confirming an Improvement Scheme under Part I. of the Housing of the Working Classes Act 1890.	
	Clonmel Corporation Provisional Order 1897 Provisional Order to alter and amend the Clonmel Corporation Act 1895. (Note: Clonmel Corporation Act 1895)	
	Thurles (Housing of the Working Classes) Provisional Order 1897 Provisional Order authorising the purchase and taking of lands otherwise than by agreement for the purposes of the Housing of the Working Classes Act 1890 Part III.	
Local Government Board (Ireland) Provisional Order Confirmation (No. 4) Act 1897	60 & 61 Vict. c. lxxxiii	15 July 1897
An Act to confirm a Provisional Order of the Local Government Board for Ireland relating to the Borough of Waterford.
	Waterford Provisional Order 1897 Provisional Order giving compulsory powers to purchase lands and premises for the purposes of Part III. of the Housing of the Working Classes Act 1890 and for an Abattoir and Rubbish Depots.	
Local Government Board (Ireland) Provisional Orders Confirmation (No. 5) Act 1897	60 & 61 Vict. c. lxxxiv	15 July 1897
An Act to confirm certain Provisional Orders of the Local Government Board for Ireland relating to Limerick and Navan and the Unions of Roscommon and Midleton.
	Limerick Provisional Order 1897 Provisional Order confirming an Improvement Scheme under Part I. of the Housing of the Working Classes Act 1890.	
	Navan Waterworks Provisional Order 1897 Navan Waterworks. Provisional Order.	
	Roscommon Waterworks Provisional Order 1897 Roscommon Waterworks. Provisional Order.	
	Carrigtwohill Waterworks Provisional Order 1897 Carrigtwohill Waterworks. Provisional Order.	
Local Government Board (Ireland) Provisional Order Confirmation (No. 6) Act 1897	60 & 61 Vict. c. lxxxv	15 July 1897
An Act to confirm a Provisional Order of the Local Government Board for Ireland relating to the Ballyshannon Union.
	Bundoran Waterworks Provisional Order 1897 Bundoran Waterworks Provisional Order.	
Local Government Board (Ireland) Provisional Order Confirmation (No. 7) Act 1897	60 & 61 Vict. c. lxxxvi	15 July 1897
An Act to confirm a Provisional Order of the Local Government Board for Ireland relating to Belfast.
	Belfast Provisional Order 1897 Provisional Order confirming an Improvement Scheme under the Housing of the Working Classes Act 1890 Part I.	
Liverpool Corporation Loans Act 1897 (repealed)	60 & 61 Vict. c. lxxxvii	15 July 1897
An Act to amend the Liverpool Corporation Loans Act 1894 (Note: Liverpool Corporation Loans Act 1894 (57 & 58 Vict. c. clx)) to confer further powers on the Corporation of the City of Liverpool with respect to the Northern Hospital and for other purposes. (Repealed by Liverpool Corporation Act 1921 (11 & 12 Geo. 5. c. lxxiv))
Arundel Gas Act 1897	60 & 61 Vict. c. lxxxviii	15 July 1897
An Act for incorporating and conferring powers on the Arundel Gas Company.
Vale of Glamorgan Railway Act 1897	60 & 61 Vict. c. lxxxix	15 July 1897
An Act for conferring further powers on the Vale of Glamorgan Railway Company for the construction of works the raising of money and otherwise in relation to their undertaking and for other purposes.
Cordoba Central Railway Company Act 1897	60 & 61 Vict. c. xc	15 July 1897
An Act to increase the Share Capital of the Cordoba Central Railway Company Limited and to vary its regulations with regard to division of profits and for other purposes.
National Provident Institution Act 1897 (repealed)	60 & 61 Vict. c. xci	15 July 1897
An Act to remove doubts as to the power of the National Provident Institution to alter and add to its Rules in certain respects. (Repealed by National Provident Institution Act 1910 (10 Edw. 7 & 1 Geo. 5. c. ix))
Bournemouth Corporation Act 1897 (repealed)	60 & 61 Vict. c. xcii	15 July 1897
An Act to authorise the Major Aldermen and Burgesses of the Borough of Bournemouth to acquire certain lands as a site for municipal and other buildings and to take a lease of certain adjacent lands and to confirm an agreement relating thereto and for other purposes. (Repealed by Bournemouth Borough Council Act 1985 (c. v))
Guild of Literature and Art (Dissolution) Act 1897	60 & 61 Vict. c. xciii	15 July 1897
An Act to provide for the winding up and dissolution of the Guild of Literature and Art and for other purposes.
Halifax Corporation Tramways Act 1897 (repealed)	60 & 61 Vict. c. xciv	15 July 1897
An Act to empower the Mayor Aldermen and Burgesses of the Borough of Halifax to construct Tramways in the Borough and for other purposes. (Repealed by West Yorkshire Act 1980 (c. xiv))
Great Eastern Railway (General Powers) Act 1897	60 & 61 Vict. c. xcv	15 July 1897
An Act to confer further powers upon the Great Eastern Railway Company to authorise them to acquire the Undertakings of the Downham and Stoke Ferry Thetford and Watton and Watton and Swaffham Railway Companies and for other purposes.
Luton Water Act 1897	60 & 61 Vict. c. xcvi	15 July 1897
An Act to authorise the Luton Water Company to raise Additional Capital and for other purposes.
Tower Subway Act 1897	60 & 61 Vict. c. xcvii	15 July 1897
An Act to enable the Tower Subway Company to sell their Subway under the Thames from Tower Hill to the opposite side of the River and to dissolve the Company.
Borrowstounness Town Improvement and Harbour Act 1897	60 & 61 Vict. c. xcviii	15 July 1897
An Act to empower the Commissioners of the Burgh of Borrowstounness to form and lay out a new Road or Street within the Burgh to confer powers on the Caledonian Railway Company with respect to parts of the North British Railway and for other purposes.
Birkenhead Corporation Act 1897	60 & 61 Vict. c. xcix	15 July 1897
An Act to consolidate the Townships within the County Borough of Birkenhead and to transfer the Township of Rock Ferry from the Wirral Union to the Birkenhead Union to confer further powers on the Corporation of the Borough in relation to Ferries and Tramways and other matters to authorise the Corporation to amend some of the provisions of the Local Acts in force within the Borough and for other purposes.
Birkenhead Corporation (Ferries) Act 1897	60 & 61 Vict. c. c	15 July 1897
An Act to authorise the Corporation of Birkenhead to purchase the Ferries across the River Mersey known as Rock Ferry and New Ferry and for other purposes.
Hoylake and West Kirby Improvement Act 1897	60 & 61 Vict. c. ci	15 July 1897
An Act to confer powers upon the Urban District Council of Hoylake and West Kirby for the construction of Parades and a Marine Lake and for the improvement of the Hoyle Lake and to make better provision for the local government health and improvement of the district and for other purposes.
Sheffield Corporation (Streets and Tramways) Act 1897 (repealed)	60 & 61 Vict. c. cii	15 July 1897
An Act to enable the Mayor Aldermen and Citizens of the City of Sheffield to construct Street and Road Improvements and additional Tramways and for other purposes. (Repealed by Sheffield Corporation (Consolidation) Act 1918 (8 & 9 Geo. 5. c. lxi))
Bristol Dock Act 1897	60 & 61 Vict. c. ciii	15 July 1897
An Act to enable the Mayor Aldermen and Burgesses of the City of Bristol to construct for the purposes of their Dock Undertaking Railways and other Works in connexion with the Harbour Railway of the Great Western Railway Company and to confer powers on that Company with reference to the construction maintenance and use of certain of the said Railways and the conveyance of Traffic to and from their Harbour Railway and for other purposes.
Liverpool Corporation Tramways Act 1897 (repealed)	60 & 61 Vict. c. civ	15 July 1897
An Act to authorise the Corporation of the City of Liverpool to acquire the Undertaking of the Liverpool United Tramways and Omnibus Company to confer powers on the Corporation for improving and working the undertaking and for borrowing money and for other purposes. (Repealed by County of Merseyside Act 1980 (c. x))
Rhondda and Swansea Bay Railway Act 1897	60 & 61 Vict. c. cv	15 July 1897
An Act to confer further powers upon and amend the Acts relating to the Rhondda and Swansea Bay Railway Company and for other purposes.
Dublin Eye and Ear Hospital Act 1897 (repealed)	60 & 61 Vict. c. cvi	15 July 1897
An Act to make provision for the establishment management and maintenance of the Dublin Eye and Ear Hospital being the amalgamation of Saint Mark's Ophthalmic Hospital and Dispensary and the National Eye and Ear Infirmary Ireland all in the City of Dublin and for other purposes. (Repealed by Statute Law (Repeals) Act 2013 (c. 2))
Crowhurst, Sidley and Bexhill Railway Act 1897	60 & 61 Vict. c. cvii	15 July 1897
An Act for making a Railway from the Tunbridge Wells and Hastings Branch of the South Eastern Railway at Crowhurst to Bexhill and for other purposes.
Manchester Ship Canal Act 1897	60 & 61 Vict. c. cviii	15 July 1897
An Act to confer further powers on the Manchester Ship Canal Company with respect to their Surplus Lands and for other purposes.
Carnarvon Corporation Act 1897	60 & 61 Vict. c. cix	15 July 1897
An Act to confer powers upon the Corporation of Carnarvon in relation to the Ferry between Carnarvon and Anglesea the construction of a Pier and other Works for the purposes thereof and for the construction of a Swing Bridge over the River Seiont and for other purposes.
Lowestoft Water and Gas Act 1897	60 & 61 Vict. c. cx	15 July 1897
An Act to confer further powers on the Lowestoft Water Gas and Market Company to change the name of the Company and for other purposes.
Liverpool, St. Helens and South Lancashire Railway Act 1897	60 & 61 Vict. c. cxi	15 July 1897
An Act to confer further powers upon the Liverpool St. Helens and South Lancashire Railway Company and for other purposes.
Hastings Harbour Act 1897	60 & 61 Vict. c. cxii	15 July 1897
An Act to revive extend and vary some of the powers of the Hastings Harbour Commissioners to confer further borrowing and other powers upon them and for other purposes.
Liverpool City Churches Act 1897	60 & 61 Vict. c. cxiii	15 July 1897
An Act for the commutation of the annual and other sums payable by the Corporation of the City of Liverpool and by the Churchwardens of the Parish of Liverpool in respect of certain Churches in the City for the investment and application of the Commutation Moneys for the removal of the Churches of Saint George and Saint John and re-uniting their respective Districts to the Parish of Liverpool and for making other Provisions consequential on and relative to the above matters.
Rathmines and Rathgar Township (Tramways and Improvement) Act 1897	60 & 61 Vict. c. cxiv	15 July 1897
An Act to empower the Rathmines and Rathgar Improvement Commissioners to purchase and work certain Tramways of the Dublin United Tramways Company and to confer further powers on the Commissioners with respect to street widenings the acquisition of lands the borrowing of moneys and for other purposes.
Hunstanton Water and Gas Act 1897 (repealed)	60 & 61 Vict. c. cxv	15 July 1897
An Act to dissolve the Hunstanton Water Company Limited and the Hunstanton Gas Company Limited and to re-incorporate the proprietors therein as a new Company for the supply of Water and Gas to Hunstanton and adjoining places in the county of Norfolk. (Repealed by North-West Norfolk Water Board Order 1969 (SI 1969/104))
Railway Clearing Committee Incorporation Act 1897 (repealed)	60 & 61 Vict. c. cxvi	15 July 1897
An Act to incorporate the Committee of Railway Companies associated under the Railway Clearing System and to enlarge the powers vested in that Committee and for other purposes. (Repealed by Railway Clearing House Scheme Order 1954 (SI 1954/139))
Crowborough District Water Act 1897 (repealed)	60 & 61 Vict. c. cxvii	15 July 1897
An Act for incorporating the Crowborough District Water Company and empowering them to construct works and supply water and for other purposes. (Repealed by Mid-Sussex Water Order 1985 (SI 1985/513))
Caledonian Railway Act 1897	60 & 61 Vict. c. cxviii	15 July 1897
An Act to enable the Caledonian Railway Company to construct new Dock Works at Grangemouth and new Railways in the Counties of Lanark and Stirling to confer further powers on them in respect to the acquisition of lands and other matters connected with their undertaking and for other purposes.
Easton and Church Hope Railway Act 1897	60 & 61 Vict. c. cxix	15 July 1897
An Act to authorise the Easton and Church Hope Railway Company to issue New Preference Stock in substitution for existing First and Second Preference Shares and for other purposes.
Railway Clearing System Superannuation Fund Incorporation Act 1897	60 & 61 Vict. c. cxx	15 July 1897
An Act to incorporate the Railway Clearing System Superannuation Fund Association and to extend the objects of that Association and for other purposes.
Dublin Corporation Act 1897	60 & 61 Vict. c. cxxi	15 July 1897
An Act to make further Provisions with respect to the Supply of Water by the Corporation of the City of Dublin and for other purposes.
Barry Railway Act 1897	60 & 61 Vict. c. cxxii	15 July 1897
An Act to enable the Barry Railway Company to construct new Railways and for other purposes.
Dublin, Wicklow and Wexford Railway (Shillelagh Extension, &c.) Act 1897	60 & 61 Vict. c. cxxiii	15 July 1897
An Act to enable the Dublin Wicklow and Wexford Railway Company to construct New Railways Widenings and other Works to confer further Powers with reference to the General Undertaking of the Company and with reference to the Separate Undertaking of the City of Dublin Junction Railways and for other purposes.
Eastbourne Waterworks Act 1897	60 & 61 Vict. c. cxxiv	15 July 1897
An Act for conferring further powers on the Eastbourne Waterworks Company for the construction of works and otherwise in relation to their undertaking and for other purposes.
New Hunstanton Water and Gas Act 1897	60 & 61 Vict. c. cxxv	15 July 1897
An Act to authorise the New Hunstanton Urban District Council to supply Water and Gas and to acquire the undertakings of the Hunstanton Water Company Limited and the Hunstanton Gas Company Limited.
Southampton Corporation Tramways Act 1897	60 & 61 Vict. c. cxxvi	15 July 1897
An Act to authorise the Mayor Aldermen and Burgesse3 of the County Borough of Southampton to acquire the undertaking of the Southampton Tramways Company and for other purposes.
North British Railway (General Powers) Act 1897	60 & 61 Vict. c. cxxvii	15 July 1897
An Act to confer further powers upon the North British Railway Company in connexion with their undertaking to amalgamate the Glasgow Yoker and Clydebank Railway Company and the Anstruther and St. Andrews Railway Company with the Company and for other purposes.
Midland and South Western Junction Railway Act 1897	60 & 61 Vict. c. cxxviii	15 July 1897
An Act to empower the Midland and South Western Junction Railway Company to convert and consolidate their debenture stocks and for other purposes.
Lanarkshire and Ayrshire Railway Act 1897	60 & 61 Vict. c. cxxix	15 July 1897
An Act to empower the Lanarkshire and Ayrshire Railway Company to construct new Railways and for other purposes.
Lancashire and Yorkshire Railway Act 1897	60 & 61 Vict. c. cxxx	15 July 1897
An Act for conferring further powers on the Lancashire and Yorkshire Railway Company to provide for the transfer to that Company of the undertakings of the West Lancashire Railway Company and the Liverpool Southport and Preston Junction Railway Company to repeal certain powers granted to the Manchester Sheffield and Lincolnshire Railway Company over those undertakings and the Lancashire and Yorkshire Railway and for other purposes.
Stromness Harbour Act 1897 (repealed)	60 & 61 Vict. c. cxxxi	15 July 1897
An Act for the incorporation of Commissioners for Stromness Harbour and the transfer to them of the Harbour Undertaking of the Stromness Harbour Commissioners for empowering them to construct new works and for other purposes. (Repealed by Orkney Islands Council Order Confirmation Act 1978 (c. iv))
Sheffield District Railway Act 1897	60 & 61 Vict. c. cxxxii	15 July 1897
An Act to authorise the Sheffield District Railway Company to construct Branch Railways in Sheffield connecting with the Midland Railway and for other purposes.
City of London Sewers Act 1897	60 & 61 Vict. c. cxxxiii	15 July 1897
An Act for the dissolution of the Commission of Sewers of the City of London and to provide for the execution of the powers authorities and duties of the Commissioners by the Common Council of the City and for other purposes.
Bolton Tramways and Improvement Act 1897	60 & 61 Vict. c. cxxxiv	15 July 1897
An Act to enable the Mayor Aldermen and Burgesses of the Borough of Bolton to construct additional tramways in and adjacent to the Borough to construct highway and other works to borrow additional moneys and for other purposes.
Great North of Scotland Railway Act 1897	60 & 61 Vict. c. cxxxv	15 July 1897
An Act to confer farther powers on the Great North of Scotland Railway Company as to the classification of their Ordinary Stocks and the provision of a Hotel.
Malvern Link Gas Act 1897	60 & 61 Vict. c. cxxxvi	15 July 1897
An Act to authorise the Urban District Council of Malvern Link to supply Gas and to provide for the transfer of the undertaking of the Malvern Link Gas Company Limited to the Council.
Local Government Board's Provisional Orders Confirmation (No. 3) Act 1897	60 & 61 Vict. c. cxxxvii	6 August 1897
An Act to confirm certain Provisional Orders of the Local Government Board relating to Brigg Harrogate Newport (Salop) Oswestry Plymouth Winslow and Worcester.
	Brigg Order 1897 Provisional Order to enable the Urban District Council of Brigg to put in force the Compulsory Clauses of the Lands Clauses Acts.	
	Harrogate Order 1897 Provisional Order to enable the Urban District Council for the Borough of Harrogate to put in force the Compulsory Clauses of the Lands Clauses Acts.	
	Newport (Salop) Order 1897 Provisional Order to enable the Urban District Council of Newport (Salop) to put in force the Compulsory Clauses of the Lands Clauses Acts.	
	Oswestry Order 1897 Provisional Order to enable the Urban District Council for the Borough of Oswestry to put in force the Compulsory Clauses of the Lands Clauses Acts.	
	Plymouth Order (No. 1) 1897 Provisional Order to enable the Urban Sanitary Authority for the Borough of Plymouth to put in force the Compulsory Clauses of the Lands Clauses Acts.	
	Wilmslow Rural Order 1897 Provisional Order to enable the Rural District Council of Winslow to put in force the Compulsory Clauses of the Lands Clauses Acts.	
	Worcester Order 1897 Provisional Order to enable the Urban Sanitary Authority for the City of Worcester to put in force the Compulsory Clauses of the Lands Clauses Acts.	
Local Government Board's Provisional Orders Confirmation (No. 11) Act 1897	60 & 61 Vict. c. cxxxviii	6 August 1897
An Act to confirm certain Provisional Orders of the Local Government Board relating to the Boroughs of Hartlepool Totnes and West Hartlepool.
	Borough of Hartlepool (Extension) Order 1897 Provisional Order made in pursuance of Sections 54 and 59 of the Local Government Act 1888.	
	Borough of Totnes (Extensions) Order 1897 Provisional Order made in pursuance of Sections 54 and 59 of the Local Government Act 1888.	
	Borough of West Hartlepool (Extension) Order 1897 Provisional Order made in pursuance of Sections 54 and 59 of the Local Government Act 1888.	
Local Government Board's Provisional Orders Confirmation (No. 12) Act 1897 (repealed)	60 & 61 Vict. c. cxxxix	6 August 1897
An Act to confirm certain Provisional Orders of the Local Government Board relating to the Counties of Derby Parts of Holland Leicester and Norfolk and to the Borough of Margate. (Repealed by Margate Pier and Harbour Revision Order 1992 (SI 1993/1313))
	Margate Order 1897 Provisional Order for altering a Local Act. (Note: Margate Extension and Improvement Act 1877 (40 & 41 Vict. c. ccvii))	
	Counties of Derby and Leicester (Woodville &c.) Order 1897 Provisional Order made in pursuance of Section 54 of the Local Government Act 1888 for altering the Boundary between Counties.	
	Counties of Norfolk and the Parts of Holland (Central Wingland) Order 1897 Provisional Order made in pursuance of Section 54 of the Local Government Act 1888 for altering the Boundary between Counties.	
Local Government Board's Provisional Orders Confirmation (No. 13) Act 1897	60 & 61 Vict. c. cxl	6 August 1897
An Act to confirm certain Provisional Orders of the Local Government Board relating to the Clare-and-Bumpstead the Luddenden-Foot and the Penybont United Districts and to the Ports of Harwich Milford and Wisbech.
	Clare and Bumpstead Joint Hospital Order 1897 Provisional Order for forming a United District under Section 279 of the Public Health Act 1875.	
	Luddenden Foot Joint Sewerage Order 1897 Provisional Order for forming a United District under Section 279 of the Public Health Act 1875.	
	Penybont Main Sewerage Order 1897 Provisional Order for forming a United District under Section 279 of the Public Health Act 1875.	
	Port Sanitary Authorities (Repeal) Order 1897 Provisional Order for partially repealing certain Confirming Acts.	
Local Government Board's Provisional Orders Confirmation (No. 14) Act 1897	60 & 61 Vict. c. cxli	6 August 1897
An Act to confirm certain Provisional Orders of the Local Government Board relating to Chorley Dover East Stonehouse Harrogate St. Helens Scarborough and Tunbridge Wells.
	Chorley Order 1897 Provisional Order for altering a Local Act. (Note: Chorley Improvement Act 1871 (34 & 35 Vict. c. lxvi))	
	Dover Order 1897 Provisional Order for altering a Confirming Act. (Note: Local Government Board's Provisional Orders Confirmation (No. 15) Act 1895 Session 2 (59 Vict. Sess. 2. c. ix))	
	East Stonehouse Order 1897 Provisional Order for altering a Local Act. (Note: East Stonehouse Water Act 1893 (56 & 57 Vict. c. lxii))	
	Harrogate Order (No. 2) 1897 Provisional Order for altering a Local Act (Note: Harrogate Corporation Act 1893 (56 & 57 Vict. c. ccix)) and a Confirming Act. (Note: Local Government (No. 6) Act 1868 (31 & 32 Vict. c. cliii))	
	St. Helens Order 1897 Provisional Order for altering certain Local Acts.	
	Scarborough Order 1897 Provisional Order for altering certain Local Acts.	
	Tunbridge Wells Order 1897 Provisional Order for altering certain Local Acts and Confirming Acts.	
Local Government Board's Provisional Orders Confirmation (No. 15) Act 1897	60 & 61 Vict. c. cxlii	6 August 1897
An Act to confirm certain Provisional Orders of the Local Government Board relating to Bradford (Yorks) Heywood Liverpool Nelson and Wigan (two).
	Bradford (Yorks) Order 1897 Provisional Order for partially repealing a Confirming Act. (Note: Local Government Act 1868 (No. 2) (31 & 32 Vict. c. lxxxiv))	
	Heywood Order 1897 Provisional Order for altering certain Local Acts and a Confirming Act. (Note: Local Government Board's Provisional Orders Confirmation (No. 11) Act 1888 (51 & 52 Vict. c. cxxxi))	
	Liverpool Order (No. 2) 1897 Provisional Order for altering certain Local Acts.	
	Nelson Order 1897 Provisional Order for partially repealing and altering certain Local Acts and Confirming Acts.	
	Wigan (Stock) Order 1897 Provisional Order for partially repealing and altering a Local Act. (Note: Wigan Corporation Act 1889 (52 & 53 Vict. c. cc))	
	Wigan Order 1897 Provisional Order for partially repealing and altering certain Local Acts and a Confirming Act. (Note: Local Government Board's Provisional Orders Confirmation (No. 19) Act 1896 (59 & 60 Vict. c. cxi))	
Local Government Board's Provisional Orders Confirmation (No. 16) Act 1897	60 & 61 Vict. c. cxliii	6 August 1897
An Act to confirm certain Provisional Orders of the Local Government Board relating to Aberystwyth Barrow-in-Furness Birmingham Bootle and Swansea.
	Aberystwyth Order 1897 Provisional Order for altering a Local Act. (Note: Aberystwyth Improvement and Water Act 1872 (35 & 36 Vict. c. xxx))	
	Barrow-in-Furness Order 1897 Provisional Order for altering certain Local Acts and a Confirming Act. (Note: Local Government Board's Provisional Orders Confirmation (No. 12) Act 1891 (54 & 55 Vict. c. clviii))	
	Birmingham Order 1897 Provisional Order for partially repealing and altering the Birmingham Corporation (Consolidation) Act 1883. (Note: Birmingham Corporation (Consolidation) Act 1883 (46 & 47 Vict. c. lxx))	
	Bootle Order 1897 Provisional Order for partially repealing and altering a Local Act. (Note: Bootle Corporation Act 1890 (53 & 54 Vict. c. ccxix))	
	Swansea Order 1897 Provisional Order for altering a Local Act (Note: Swansea Municipal Corporation Act 1863 (26 & 27 Vict. c. xiii)) and a Confirming Act. (Note: Local Government Board's Provisional Orders Confirmation (No. 4) Act 1893 (56 & 57 Vict. c. cxv))	
Local Government Board's Provisional Order Confirmation (No. 17) Act 1897 (repealed)	60 & 61 Vict. c. cxliv	6 August 1897
An Act to confirm a Provisional Order of the Local Government Board relating to the Borough of Hastings. (Repealed by East Sussex Act 1981 (c. xxv))
	Borough of Hastings (Extension) Order 1897 Provisional Order made in pursuance of Sections 54 and 59 of the Local Government Act 1888.	
Local Government Board's Provisional Order Confirmation (No. 18) Act 1897 (repealed)	60 & 61 Vict. c. cxlv	6 August 1897
An Act to confirm a Provisional Order of the Local Government Board relating to the Borough of Blackburn. (Repealed by County of Lancashire Act 1984 (c. xxi))
	Blackburn Order 1897 Provisional Order for altering certain Local Acts.	
Education Department Provisional Orders Confirmation (East Barnet, &c.) Act 1897	60 & 61 Vict. c. cxlvi	6 August 1897
An Act to confirm certain Provisional Orders made by the Education Department under the Elementary Education Acts 1870 to 1893 to enable the School Boards for East Barnet Linthwaite Pembroke Swansea United District and Willesden to put in force the Lands Clauses Acts.
	East Barnet (Hertfordshire) School Board Order 1897 Provisional Order for putting in force the Lands Clauses Acts.	
	Linthwaite (Yorkshire West Riding) School Board Order 1897 Provisional Order for putting in force the Lands Clauses Acts.	
	Pembroke (Pembrokeshire) School Board Order 1897 Provisional Order for putting in force the Lands Clauses Acts.	
	Swansea (Glamorgan) School Board Order (No. 1) 1897 Provisional Order for putting in force the Lands Clauses Acts.	
	Swansea (Glamorgan) School Board Order (No. 2) 1897 Provisional Order for putting in force the Lands Clauses Acts.	
	Willesden (Middlesex) School Board Order 1897 Provisional Order for putting in force the Lands Clauses Acts.	
Education Department Provisional Order Confirmation (London) Act 1897	60 & 61 Vict. c. cxlvii	6 August 1897
An Act to confirm a Provisional Order made by the Education Department under the Elementary Education Act 1870 (Note: Elementary Education Act 1870 (33 & 34 Vict. c. 75)) to enable the School Board for London to put in force the Lands Clauses Acts.
	London School Board Order 1897 Provisional Order for putting in force the Lands Clauses Acts.	
Pier and Harbour Orders Confirmation (No. 3) Act 1897	60 & 61 Vict. c. cxlviii	6 August 1897
An Act to confirm certain Provisional Orders made by the Board of Trade under the General Pier and Harbour Act 1861 relating to Bangor Clacton Poole Tenby and Walton-on-the-Naze.
	Bangor Corporation Pier Order 1897 Order for authorising the Mayor Aldermen and Burgesses of the Borough of Bangor to raise additional moneys in respect of their Pier and Ferry Undertakings and for other purposes.	
	Clacton-on-Sea Jetty Order 1897 Order for the Construction Maintenance and Regulation of a Jetty or Landing Stage at Clacton in the County of Essex.	
	Poole (Sandbanks) Pier Order 1897 Order for the Regulation of a Promenade and Landing Pier at the Sandbanks at the Entrance to Poole Harbour in the County of Dorset.	
	Tenby Pier and Landing Stage Order 1897 Order for the construction maintenance and regulation of a Pier and Landing Stage and other works at Tenby in the county of Pembroke and for other purposes.	
	Walton-on-the-Naze Pier Order 1897 Order for authorising an extension enlargement and improvement of the Pier at Walton-on-the-Naze in the County of Essex and for other purposes.	
Pier and Harbour Orders Confirmation (No. 4) Act 1897	60 & 61 Vict. c. cxlix	6 August 1897
An Act to confirm certain Provisional Orders made by the Board of Trade under the General Pier and Harbour Act 1861 relating to Annan Clacton and Whiting Bay.
	Annan Harbour Order 1897 Order for incorporating the Trustees of the Harbour of Annan in the county of Dumfries and vesting the harbour in them and for the improvement maintenance and regulation of the harbour.	
	Clacton-on-Sea Pier Order 1897 Order for authorising an extension and improvement of the pier at Clacton-on-Sea in the County of Essex.	
	Whiting Bay Pier Order 1897 Order for the construction maintenance and regulation of a Pier and Works at Whiting Bay in the Parish of Kilbride Island of Arran and County of Bute.	
Pier and Harbour Order Confirmation (No. 6) Act 1897	60 & 61 Vict. c. cl	6 August 1897
An Act to confirm a Provisional Order made by the Board of Trade under the General Pier and Harbour Act 1861 relating to Donegal.
	Donegal Harbour Order 1897 Order for the Improvement Maintenance and Regulation of Donegal Harbour in the County of Donegal.	
Tramways Orders Confirmation (No. 1) Act 1897	60 & 61 Vict. c. cli	6 August 1897
An Act to confirm certain Provisional Orders made by the Board of Trade under the Tramways Act 1870 (Note: Tramways Act 1870 (33 & 34 Vict. c. 78)) relating to Blackpool Corporation Tramways Manchester Carriage and Tramways Company's Tramways Manchester Corporation Tramways Moss Side Tramways and Withington District Tramways.
	Blackpool Corporation Tramways Order 1897 Order authorising the Mayor Aldermen and Burgesses of the Borough of Blackpool to construct additional Tramways in the said Borough.	
	Manchester Carriage and Tramways Company's Order 1897 Order authorising the Manchester Carriage and Tramways Company to construct Tramways.	
	Manchester Corporation Tramways Order 1897 Order authorising the Mayor Aldermen and Citizens of the City of Manchester in the County of Lancaster to construct additional Tramways in the said City.	
	Moss Side Tramways Order 1897 Order authorising the Urban District Council for the District of Moss Side in the County of Lancaster to construct certain Tramways in the said District.	
	Withington District Tramways Order 1897 Order authorising the Council for the Urban District of Withington in the County of Lancaster to construct Tramways in the said District.	
Tramways Orders Confirmation (No. 2) Act 1897	60 & 61 Vict. c. clii	6 August 1897
An Act to confirm certain Provisional Orders made by the Board of Trade under the Tramways Act 1870 relating to Great Grimsby Street Tramways Extension Huddersfield Corporation Tramways Morecambe Urban District Council Tramways Perth and District Tramways (Extensions) and Stirling and Bridge of Allan Tramways Extension.
	Great Grimsby Street Tramways Extension Order 1897 Order authorising the Great Grimsby Street Tramways Company to construct an additional Tramway in the hamlet of Cleethorpes in the parish of Old Clee in the county of Lincoln and to confer further powers upon the Great Grimsby Street Tramways Company and for other purposes.	
	Huddersfield Corporation Tramways Order 1897 Order authorising the Mayor Aldermen and Burgesses of the County Borough of Huddersfield to construct Tramways in the said Borough.	
	Morecambe Urban District Council Tramways Order 1897 Order authorising the Urban District Council of Morecambe to construct Tramways in their District and for other purposes.	
	Perth and District Tramways Extensions Order 1897 Order authorising the Perth and District Tramways Company Limited to construct Extension Tramways in the City and Burgh of Perth.	
	Stirling and Bridge of Allan Tramways Order 1897 Order authorising the construction of a Tramway from Stirling to St. Ninians in the county of Stirling.	
Tramways Orders Confirmation (No. 3) Act 1897	60 & 61 Vict. c. cliii	6 August 1897
An Act to confirm certain Provisional Orders made by the Board of Trade under the Tramways Act 1870 relating to Middlesbrough Stockton-on-Tees and Thornaby Tramways Yarmouth and Gorleston Tramways Extension and York Tramways.
	Middlesbrough Stockton-upon-Tees and Thornaby Tramways Order 1897 Order authorising the Imperial Tramways Company Limited to construct Street Tramways in Middlesbrough Stockton-on-Tees and Thornaby and the neighbourhood thereof and for other purposes.	
	Yarmouth and Gorleston Tramways Extension Order 1897 Order authorising the Yarmouth and Gorleston Tramways Company Limited to construct an Extension Tramway in the Borough of Great Yarmouth and for other purposes.	
	York Tramways Order 1897 Order authorising the use of electrical and mechanical power (other than steam) on authorised and constructed Tramways and for other purposes.	
Gas Orders Confirmation (No. 1) Act 1897	60 & 61 Vict. c. cliv	6 August 1897
An Act to confirm certain Provisional Orders made by the Board of Trade under the Gas and Water Works Facilities Act 1870 relating to Hoylake and West Kirby Gas Killamarsh Gas Sedbergh Gas and Westbury Gas.
	Hoylake and West Kirby Gas Order 1897 Order empowering the Hoylake and West Kirby Gas and Water Company Limited to raise additional Capital for the purposes of their Gas Undertaking.	
	Killamarsh Gas Order 1897 Order empowering the Killamarsh Gas Light and Coke Company Limited to construct and maintain Gasworks and to make and supply Gas within the parish of Killamarsh in the county of Derby.	
	Sedbergh Gas Order 1897 Order empowering the Sedbergh New Gas Company Limited to maintain and continue Gasworks and to manufacture and supply Gas in the township of Sedbergh in the parish of Sedbergh in the west riding of the county of York.	
	Westbury Gas Order 1897 Order empowering the Westbury Gas and Coke Company Limited to maintain and continue Gasworks to construct and maintain additional Works to purchase additional Lands and to manufacture and supply Gas within the parishes of Westbury Upton Scudamore Dilton Marsh Bratton Edington and Heywood-cum-Hawkeridge in the county of Wilts.	
Gas Orders Confirmation (No. 2) Act 1897	60 & 61 Vict. c. clv	6 August 1897
An Act to confirm certain Provisional Orders made by the Board of Trade under the Gas and Water Works Facilities Act 1870 relating to Cradley Heath Gas Harrogate Gas and Wimborne Minster Gas.
	Cradley Heath Gas Order 1897 Order empowering the Cradley Heath Gas Company to raise additional Capital and for other purposes.	
	Harrogate Gas Order 1897 Order empowering the Harrogate Gas Company to extend their existing Gasworks and to construct Works for the manufacture of Residual Products and to raise additional Capital and for other purposes.	
	Wimborne Minster Gas Order 1897 Order empowering the Wimborne Minster Gas and Coal Company Limited to construct maintain and continue Gasworks and to manufacture and supply Gas in the parishes of Wimborne Minster and Colehill in the county of Dorset and for other purposes.	
Water Orders Confirmation Act 1897	60 & 61 Vict. c. clvi	6 August 1897
An Act to confirm certain Provisional Orders made by the Board of Trade under the Gas and Water Works Facilities Act 1870 relating to Barton-upon-Humber Water Bridge of Allan Water Frith Hill Godalming and Farncombe Water Gosport Water Newmarket Water Royston Water and Steyning and District Water.
	Barton-upon-Humber Water Order 1897 Order empowering the Barton-upon-Humber Water Company Limited to maintain and continue Waterworks and to supply Water in the Parishes of Barton-upon-Humber Barrow and Goxhill in the Parts of Lindsey in the County of Lincoln.	
	Bridge of Allan Water Order 1897 Order empowering the Bridge of Allan Water Company to extend and improve their Works and to raise additional Capital.	
	Frith Hill Godalming and Farncombe Water Order 1897 Order empowering the Frith Hill Godalming and Farncombe Water Company Limited to construct additional Waterworks in the Parish of Godalming in the County of Surrey to raise additional Capital and other purposes.	
	Gosport Water Order 1897 Order empowering the Gosport Waterworks Company to extend their Limits of Supply to construct additional Waterworks in the Parishes of Alverstoke and Rowner in the County of Southampton and to raise additional Capital.	
	Newmarket Water Order 1897 Order empowering the Newmarket Waterworks Company Limited to raise additional Capital.	
	Royston Water Order 1897 Order empowering the Royston Water Company Limited to maintain and continue Waterworks and to supply Water in the Parishes of North Royston South Bassingbourn South Kneesworth South Melbourn South Royston otherwise called Royston (Herts) and part of the Parish of Therfield in the County of Hertford.	
	Steyning and District Water Order 1897 Order authorising the construction and maintenance of Waterworks and the supply of Water to the Town and Parish of Steyning and the Parishes of Bramber and Upper Beeding in the County of Sussex and for other purposes.	
Pilotage Order Confirmation Act 1897 (repealed)	60 & 61 Vict. c. clvii	6 August 1897
An Act to confirm a Provisional Order made by the Board of Trade under the Merchant Shipping Act 1894 (Note: Merchant Shipping Act 1894 (57 & 58 Vict. c. 60)) relating to Rosslare (Pilotage District of Wexford). (Repealed by Statute Law (Repeals) Act 1995 (c. 44))
	Rosslare Pilotage Order 1897 Order for Exempting from Compulsory Pilotage Vessels bound to and from the Port of Rosslare.	
Borrowstounness Water Order Confirmation Act 1897	60 & 61 Vict. c. clviii	6 August 1897
An Act to confirm a Provisional Order under the Public Health (Scotland) Act 1867 and the Acts amending the same relating to Borrowstounness Water Supply.
	Borrowstounness Water Order 1897 Provisional Order.	
Duntocher and Dalmuir Water Order Confirmation Act 1897	60 & 61 Vict. c. clix	6 August 1897
An Act to confirm a Provisional Order under the Public Health (Scotland) Act 1867 and the Acts amending the same relating to Dun tocher and Dalmuir Water Supply.
	Duntocher and Dalmuir Water Order 1897 Provisional Order.	
Electric Lighting Orders Confirmation (No. 7) Act 1897	60 & 61 Vict. c. clx	6 August 1897
An Act to confirm certain Provisional Orders made by the Board of Trade under the Electric Lighting Acts 1882 and 1888 relating to Denton Droylsden Levenshulme Moss Side Stretford and Withington.
	Denton Electric Lighting Order 1897 Provisional Order granted by the Board of Trade under the Electric Lighting Acts 1882 and 1888 to the Urban District Council of Denton in respect of the Urban District of Denton.	
	Droylsden Electric Lighting Order 1897 Provisional Order granted by the Board of Trade under the Electric Lighting Acts 1882 and 1888 to the Urban District Council of Droylsden in respect of the Urban District of Droylsden.	
	Levenshulme Electric Lighting Order 1897 Provisional Order granted by the Board of Trade under the Electric Lighting Acts 1882 and 1888 to the Urban District Council of Levenshulme in the County of Lancaster in respect of the Urban District of Tevenshulme.	
	Moss Side Electric Lighting Order 1897 Provisional Order granted by the Board of Trade under the Electric Lighting Acts 1882 and 1888 to the Urban District Council of Moss Side in respect of the District of Moss Side in the County of Lancaster.	
	Stretford Electric Lighting Order 1897 Provisional Order granted by the Board of Trade under the Electric Lighting Acts 1882 and 1888 to the Urban District Council of Stretford in respect of the District of Stretford in the County of Lancaster.	
	Withington Electric Lighting Order 1897 Provisional Order granted by the Board of Trade under the Electric Lighting Acts 1882 and 1888 to the Urban District Council of Withington in respect of the District of Withington in the County of Lancaster.	
Electric Lighting Orders Confirmation (No. 8) Act 1897	60 & 61 Vict. c. clxi	6 August 1897
An Act to confirm certain Provisional Orders made by the Board of Trade under the Electric Lighting Acts 1882 and 1888 relating to Bangor Bexhill Epsom Galway and Northwich.
	Bangor (Corporation) Electric Lighting Order 1897 Provisional Order granted by the Board of Trade under the Electric Lighting Acts 1882 and 1888 to the Mayor Aldermen and Citizens of the Borough of Bangor in the County of Carnarvon in respect of the Borough of Bangor and the Ogwen Rural District.	
	Bexhill Electric Lighting Order 1897 Provisional Order granted by the Board of Trade under the Electric Lighting Acts 1882 and 1888 to the Bexhill Urban District Council in respect of the Urban District of Bexhill.	
	Epsom Electric Lighting Order 1897 Provisional Order granted by the Board of Trade under the Electric Lighting Acts 1882 and 1888 to the Epsom Urban District Council in respect of the Urban Sanitary District of Epsom in the County of Surrey.	
	Galway Electric Lighting Order 1897 Provisional Order granted by the Board of Trade under the Electric Lighting Acts 1882 and 1888 to the Galway Electric Company Limited in respect of the Town of Galway.	
	Northwich and District Electric Lighting Order 1897 Provisional Order granted by the Board of Trade under the Electric Lighting Acts 1882 and 1888 to the Northwich Electric Supply Company Limited in respect of the District of the Northwich Urban District Council and part of the District of the Northwich Rural District Council both in the County of Chester.	
Electric Lighting Orders Confirmation (No. 9) Act 1897	60 & 61 Vict. c. clxii	6 August 1897
An Act to confirm certain Provisional Orders made by the Board of Trade under the Electric Lighting Acts 1882 and 1888 relating to (1) St. George’s-in-the-East Mile End Old Town and Limehouse (2) Holborn Liberty of Charterhouse and Shoreditch (3) Fulham and (4) Westminster.
	County of London (East) Electric Lighting Order 1897 Provisional Order granted by the Board of Trade under the Electric Lighting Acts 1882 and 1888 to the County of London and Brush Provincial Electric Lighting Company Limited in respect of the Parish of St. George-in-the-East the Hamlet of Mile End Old Town and the District of Limehouse all in the County of London.	
	County of London (Northern Extensions) Electric Lighting Order 1897 Provisional Order granted by the Board of Trade under the Electric Lighting Acts 1882 and 1888 to the County of London and Brush Provincial Electric Lighting Company Limited in respect of portion of the District of the Holborn District Board of Works and of the Liberty of the Charterhouse and of portion of the Parish of St. Leonard's Shoreditch in the County of London.	
	Fulham Electric Lighting Order 1897 Provisional Order granted by the Board of Trade under the Electric Lighting Acts 1882 and 1888 to the Vestry of the Parish of Fulham in respect of the Parish of Fulham in the Administrative County of London.	
	London Electric Supply Corporation Electric Lighting (Westminster) Order 1897 Provisional Order granted by the Board of Trade under the Electric Lighting Acts 1882 and 1888 authorising the London Electric Supply Corporation Limited to supply Energy for all Public and Private Purposes within the Parishes of St. Margaret and St. John-the-Evangelist Westminster.	
Electric Lighting Orders Confirmation (No. 10) Act 1897	60 & 61 Vict. c. clxiii	6 August 1897
An Act to confirm certain Provisional Orders made by the Board of Trade under the Electric Lighting Acts 1882 and 1888 relating to Newmarket and Poole and Branksome.
	Newmarket Electric Lighting Order 1897 Provisional Order granted by the Board of Trade under the Electric Lighting Acts 1882 and 1888 to the Urban District Council of Newmarket in respect of the Urban District of Newmarket.	
	Poole and Branksome Electric Lighting Order 1897 Provisional Order granted by the Board of Trade under the Electric Lighting Acts 1882 and 1888 to the Bournemouth and District Electric Supply Company Limited in respect of the borough of Poole and the urban district of Branksome both in the county of Dorset.	
Electric Lighting Orders Confirmation (No. 11) Act 1897	60 & 61 Vict. c. clxiv	6 August 1897
An Act to confirm certain Provisional Orders made by the Board of Trade under the Electric Lighting Acts 1882 and 1888 relating to Blackheath and Greenwich District and Newington.
	Blackheath and Greenwich District Electric Lighting Order 1897 Provisional Order granted by the Board of Trade under the Electric Lighting Acts 1882 and 1888 to the Blackheath and Greenwich District Electric Light Company Limited in respect of the Parish of Greenwich and parts of the Parishes of Charlton Eltham Kidbrook Lee and Lewisham all in the County of London.	
	Newington Electric Lighting Order 1897 Provisional Order granted by the Board of Trade under the Electric Lighting Acts 1882 and 1888 to the Vestry of the Parish of Saint Mary Newington in the County of London in respect of the Parish of Saint Mary Newington.	
London (Green Street, Southwark) Provisional Order Confirmation Act 1897	60 & 61 Vict. c. clxv	6 August 1897
An Act to confirm a Provisional Order made by one of Her Majesty's Principal Secretaries of State under the Housing of the Working Classes Act 1890 relating to Lands in Green Street in the Parish of St. George the Martyr Southwark.
	London (Green Street, Southwark) Order 1897 Order to enable the London County Council to put in force the powers of the Lands Clauses Acts with respect to the purchase and taking of land otherwise than by agreement for the purposes of Part III. of the Housing of the Working Classes Act 1890.	
Post Office (Sites) Act 1897 (repealed)	60 & 61 Vict. c. clxvi	6 August 1897
An Act to enable Her Majesty's Postmaster-General to acquire Lands in London Brighton Norwich Plymouth Southampton Oban and Cork for the Public Service and for other purposes. (Repealed by Postal Services Act 2000 (Consequential Modifications to Local Enactments) Order 2003 (SI 2003/1542))
South Western Railway (Various Powers) Act 1897	60 & 61 Vict. c. clxvii	6 August 1897
An Act to confer further powers upon the London and South Western Railway Company with respect to their own undertaking and to confirm an Agreement for the working by the Company of the Torrington and Okehampton Railway and to confer upon the Company and the Waterloo and City and the London Brighton and South Coast Railway Companies further powers with respect to undertakings in which they are jointly interested and for other purposes.
Newport Corporation Act 1897	60 & 61 Vict. c. clxviii	6 August 1897
An Act to confer further powers upon the Mayor Aldermen and Burgesses of the Borough of Newport with respect to Waterworks and other matters and for other purposes.
North Pembrokeshire and Fishguard Railway Act 1897	60 & 61 Vict. c. clxix	6 August 1897
An Act to authorise the abandonment of the Llandilo Loop and the Construction of new Railways in the counties of Pembroke and Carmarthen and for other purposes.
Mersey Docks Act 1897 (repealed)	60 & 61 Vict. c. clxx	6 August 1897
An Act to confer further powers upon the Mersey Docks and Harbour Board and for other purposes. (Repealed by Mersey Docks and Harbour Board (Ore Berth) Act 1971 (c. xxxiv))
Glasgow and Renfrew District Railway Act 1897	60 & 61 Vict. c. clxxi	6 August 1897
An Act for incorporating the Glasgow and Renfrew District Railway Company and authorising the construction of Railways in the Counties of Renfrew and Lanark and for other purposes.
Glasgow and South Western Railway Act 1897	60 & 61 Vict. c. clxxii	6 August 1897
An Act for conferring further powers on the Glasgow and South Western Railway Company for the construction of works and the acquisition of lands for consolidating and converting their Preference and Ordinary Stocks and for other purposes.
Tuxford and District Gas Act 1897	60 & 61 Vict. c. clxxiii	6 August 1897
An Act for incorporating and conferring powers upon the Tuxford and District Gas Light and Coke Company.
Vale of Rheidol (Light) Railway Act 1897	60 & 61 Vict. c. clxxiv	6 August 1897
An Act for making a Light Railway between Aberystwyth and Devil's Bridge in the County of Cardigan and for other purposes.
Paisley and Barrhead District Railway Act 1897	60 & 61 Vict. c. clxxv	6 August 1897
An Act to authorise the construction of Railways in the county of Renfrew.
Newry Navigation Act 1897	60 & 61 Vict. c. clxxvi	6 August 1897
An Act to authorise the Newry Navigation Company to consolidate and convert their Mortgage Debt and for other purposes.
Taff Vale Railway Act 1897	60 & 61 Vict. c. clxxvii	6 August 1897
An Act to empower the Taff Vale Railway Company to construct a new Railway and other Works and acquire Lands and for other purposes.
Deal and Walmer Water Act 1897	60 & 61 Vict. c. clxxviii	6 August 1897
An Act to enable the Mayor Aldermen and Burgesses of the Borough of Deal and the Urban District Council of Walmer to acquire the undertaking of the Company of Proprietors of the Deal Waterworks to vest such undertaking partly in a Joint Board and partly in each of the said Local Authorities to authorise the said Authorities respectively to supply their own districts and the neighbourhoods thereof respectively and for other purposes.
Callander and Oban Railway Act 1897	60 & 61 Vict. c. clxxix	6 August 1897
An Act to empower the Callander and Oban Railway Company to construct new Railways and Works in the county of Argyle and for other purposes.
Cirencester Water Act 1897 (repealed)	60 & 61 Vict. c. clxxx	6 August 1897
An Act to authorise the Urban District Council of Cirencester to purchase the undertaking of the Cirencester Waterworks Company Limited and to supply water throughout the district and the adjoining parish of Stratton. (Repealed by Cotswold Water Board Order 1961 (SI 1961/187))
Colne Corporation Act 1897 (repealed)	60 & 61 Vict. c. clxxxi	6 August 1897
An Act for making further and better provision in regard to the Water Supply and the improvement health and good government of the Borough of Colne and for other purposes. (Repealed by County of Lancashire Act 1984 (c. xxi))
Midland and Great Northern Railways Joint Committee Act 1897	60 & 61 Vict. c. clxxxii	6 August 1897
An Act to empower the Midland and Great Northern Railways Joint Committee to construct a Railway at Great Yarmouth and other Works and to acquire lands and for other purposes.
Midland Railway Act 1897	60 & 61 Vict. c. clxxxiii	6 August 1897
An Act to confer additional powers upon the Midland Railway Company for the construction of Works and the acquisition of Lands to empower that Company and the London Tilbury and Southend Railway Company to guarantee the capital of the Tottenham and Forest Gate Railway Company to authorise agreements between the Midland Railway Company the Lancashire Derbyshire and East Coast Railway Company and the Sheffield District Railway Company and to vest in the Midland Railway Company the undertaking of the Kettering Thrapston and Huntingdon Railway Company to authorise the re-arrangement and consolidation of the existing capital of the Midland Railway Company and for other purposes.
Newark Corporation Waterworks Act 1897	60 & 61 Vict. c. clxxxiv	6 August 1897
An Act to extend the powers of the Mayor Aldermen and Burgesses of the Borough of Newark with respect to their supply of Water and for other purposes.
Llandudno Urban District Council Act 1897	60 & 61 Vict. c. clxxxv	6 August 1897
An Act to empower the Llandudno Urban District Council to acquire the undertaking of the Great Ormes Head Marine Drive Company to make further provisions for the good government of Llandudno and for other purposes.
St. Neot's Water Act 1897 (repealed)	60 & 61 Vict. c. clxxxvi	6 August 1897
An Act for supplying with Water the Parishes of Saint Neot's and Eynesbury in the County of Huntingdon. (Repealed by St. Neot's Urban District Council Act 1907 (7 Edw. 7. c. xxxix))
Swadlincote District Gas Act 1897	60 & 61 Vict. c. clxxxvii	6 August 1897
An Act to authorise the Swadlincote District Urban District Council to supply Gas and to provide for the transfer of the undertaking of the Swadlincote Gas and Coke Company Limited to the said Council and for other purposes.
Alexandra (Newport and South Wales) Docks and Railway Act 1897	60 & 61 Vict. c. clxxxviii	6 August 1897
An Act to provide for the surrender of the lease of the Alexandra (Newport and South Wales) Docks and Railway Company's Undertaking to the Newport (Alexandra) Dock Company Limited and to authorise the transfer to the Company of the Pontypridd Caerphilly and Newport Railway and for other purposes.
Belfast Water Act 1897	60 & 61 Vict. c. clxxxix	6 August 1897
An Act to confer further powers on the Belfast City and District Water Commissioners.
North London Railway Act 1897	60 & 61 Vict. c. cxc	6 August 1897
An Act to enable the North London Railway Company to improve the access to the Poplar Dock and for other purposes.
Great Western Railway (Bristol Lines) Act 1897	60 & 61 Vict. c. cxci	6 August 1897
An Act to empower the Great Western Railway Company to make new Railways and Works at Bristol and for other purposes.
Brompton and Piccadilly Circus Railway Act 1897	60 & 61 Vict. c. cxcii	6 August 1897
An Act for incorporating the Brompton and Piccadilly Circus Railway Company and for empowering them to construct an Underground Railway from Piccadilly Circus to South Kensington and for other purposes.
Great Northern and City Railway Act 1897	60 & 61 Vict. c. cxciii	6 August 1897
An Act to extend the powers for the purchase of land and the time for the completion of the Railway authorised by the Great Northern and City Railway Act 1892 (Note: Great Northern and City Railway Act 1892 (55 & 56 Vict. c. ccxlii)) and to amend some of the provisions of that Act.
Weston-super-Mare Grand Pier Act 1897	60 & 61 Vict. c. cxciv	6 August 1897
An Act to extend the time for the completion of the Pier and Works authorised by the Weston-super-Mare Grand Pier Act 1893 (Note: Weston-super-Mare Grand Pier Act 1893 (56 & 57 Vict. c. xxx)) and for other purposes.
Yorkshire Dales Railway (Skipton to Grassington) Act 1897	60 & 61 Vict. c. cxcv	6 August 1897
An Act for making a Railway from Skipton to Grassington in the West Riding of the County of York and for other purposes.
King's Lynn Conservancy Act 1897	60 & 61 Vict. c. cxcvi	6 August 1897
An Act to constitute a Conservancy Board for the Port and Harbour of King's Lynn to transfer to and vest in such Board the powers of the Corporation of King's Lynn relating to the Port and Harbour and all the powers and property of the Harbour Mooring or Pilot Commissioners of the Port and of the body known as Select Trustees appointed under the Eau Brink Act 1831 (Note: Eau Brink Act 1831 (1 & 2 Will. 4. c. lxxiii)) and for other purposes.
Dundee Corporation Act 1897 (repealed)	60 & 61 Vict. c. cxcvii	6 August 1897
An Act for enabling the City and Burgh of Dundee to borrow additional money for their gas undertaking and to extend their electric lighting area and for amending and extending the improvement and other Acts applicable to the city and burgh and for other purposes. (Repealed by North of Scotland Electricity Order Confirmation Act 1958 (7 & 8 Eliz. 2. c. ii))
East London Waterworks Act 1897	60 & 61 Vict. c. cxcviii	6 August 1897
An Act to authorise the East London Waterworks Company to execute further Works and to raise further Money in order to enable them to fulfil their statutory obligations relating to the supply of water or otherwise and to meet the increased demand for water within their district to confer further powers upon and make further provision with respect to the undertaking of the Company and for other purposes.
Leeds Corporation Act 1897 (repealed)	60 & 61 Vict. c. cxcix	6 August 1897
An Act to empower the Mayor Aldermen and Citizens of the City of Leeds to acquire lands for the purpose of protecting their waters and waterworks from pollution for the construction of Tramways and Street Improvements and for other purposes. (Repealed by Leeds Water Order 1960 (SI 1960/612))
Nottingham Corporation Water Act 1897	60 & 61 Vict. c. cc	6 August 1897
An Act to empower the Corporation of Nottingham to construct additional Waterworks and for other purposes.
Dublin, Wicklow and Wexford Railway (New Ross and Waterford Extension) Act 1897	60 & 61 Vict. c. cci	6 August 1897
An Act to enable the Dublin Wicklow and Wexford Railway Company to construct Railways between New Ross and Waterford in the Counties of Kilkenny and Waterford and for other purposes.
Hastings Harbour District Railway Act 1897 (repealed)	60 & 61 Vict. c. ccii	6 August 1897
An Act for making a Railway in and near the Town of Hastings and a Parade or Roadway and Seawall and for other purposes. (Repealed by Hastings Harbour District Railway (Abandonment) Act 1905 (5 Edw. 7. c. xxiv))
Birmingham North Warwickshire and Stratford-upon-Avon Railway Act 1897	60 & 61 Vict. c. cciii	6 August 1897
An Act to extend the Time for the Compulsory Purchase of Lands for and for the Completion of the Birmingham North Warwickshire and Stratford-upon-Avon Railway and for other purposes.
Great Yarmouth Corporation Act 1897	60 & 61 Vict. c. cciv	6 August 1897
An Act to make provision with respect to the Construction and Purchase of Piers by the Mayor Aldermen and Burgesses of the Borough of Great Yarmouth and in regard to the health local government and improvement of the said borough and for other purposes.
Pwllheli Corporation Act 1897	60 & 61 Vict. c. ccv	6 August 1897
An Act to confer upon the Mayor Aldermen and Burgesses of the borough of Pwllheli powers in regard to the Harbour Markets and Water Supply of the said borough and for other purposes.
Weymouth Waterworks Act 1897	60 & 61 Vict. c. ccvi	6 August 1897
An Act for extending the limits of Supply of the Company of Proprietors of the Weymouth Waterworks and for conferring further powers on that Company for the construction of Works and the raising of Capital and for other purposes.
Cardiff Railway Act 1897	60 & 61 Vict. c. ccvii	6 August 1897
An Act for empowering the Bute Docks Company to construct certain Railways for conferring upon that Company certain running powers for empowering them to construct a Low Water Pier for changing the name of the Company and for authorising the Company to raise Additional Capital and for other purposes.
Great Northern Railway (Ireland) Act 1897	60 & 61 Vict. c. ccviii	6 August 1897
An Act to authorise the Great Northern Railway Company (Ireland) to construct Tramways and Tramroads from Sutton to Howth to acquire and maintain Hotels and Refreshments Rooms and for other purposes.
Tyne Improvement Act 1897	60 & 61 Vict. c. ccix	6 August 1897
An Act for empowering the Tyne Improvement Commissioners to create and issue Stock and for the completion of works and for amending certain of the provisions of the Tyne Improvement Acts 1850 to 1890 and for other purposes.
Tynemouth Corporation (Water) Act 1897	60 & 61 Vict. c. ccx	6 August 1897
An Act to empower the Mayor Aldermen and Burgesses of the Borough of Tynemouth in the County of Northumberland to supply Water to the Borough of Tynemouth and adjacent places to acquire the undertaking of the Company of Proprietors of the North Shields Waterworks and for other purposes.
Birmingham Churches Act 1897	60 & 61 Vict. c. ccxi	6 August 1897
An Act to authorise the Sale of the Church of Christchurch and the Sale of the Church of Saint Peter with the School thereof (all in the City of Birmingham) and the application of the proceeds of sale to the provision of new Churches and Schools in the suburbs of Birmingham to merge the Ecclesiastical Parishes or Districts of Christchurch and Saint Peter in the Ecclesiastical Parish of Saint Philip to amend the Saint Martin's Rectory Birmingham Act 1893 (Note: Saint Martin's Rectory Birmingham Act 1893 (56 & 57 Vict. c. xlv)) and for other purposes.
Gravesend and Milton Waterworks Act 1897	60 & 61 Vict. c. ccxii	6 August 1897
An Act to enable the Gravesend and Milton Waterworks Company to raise additional capital and for other purposes.
Didcot, Newbury and Southampton Railway Act 1897	60 & 61 Vict. c. ccxiii	6 August 1897
An Act to confer further powers on the Didcot Newbury and Southampton Railway Company.
East Warwickshire Waterworks Act 1897 (repealed)	60 & 61 Vict. c. ccxiv	6 August 1897
An Act to confirm an Agreement for the transfer of the Undertaking of the East Warwickshire Waterworks Company to the Urban District Council of Nuneaton and Chilvers Coton and to enable the Council to construct Additional Waterworks and for other purposes. (Repealed by Statute Law (Repeals) Act 1995 (c. 44))
Glasgow Corporation (Improvements and General Powers) Act 1897	60 & 61 Vict. c. ccxv	6 August 1897
An Act to enable the Corporation of Glasgow to effect further Improvements within the City to lease and work the Vale of Clyde or Govan Tramways and the Glasgow and Ibrox Tramway to construct new Tramways and for other purposes.
Highland Railway (Additional Powers) Act 1897	60 & 61 Vict. c. ccxvi	6 August 1897
An Act to authorise the Highland Railway Company to construct Railways being partly doubling or widening of their existing Railway to acquire additional lands to revive the powers and extend the time limited by certain Acts for the completion of Works to raise further capital and for other purposes.
Invergarry and Fort Augustus Railway Act 1897	60 & 61 Vict. c. ccxvii	6 August 1897
An Act to confer further powers upon the Invergarry and Fort Augustus Railway Company.
Leicester Corporation Act 1897 (repealed)	60 & 61 Vict. c. ccxviii	6 August 1897
An Act to extend the limits for the Supply of Gas and Water by the Mayor Aldermen and Burgesses of the County Borough of Leicester and to make further and better provision in relation to the local government of the said borough and for other purposes. (Repealed by Leicestershire Act 1985 (c. xvii))
Lochearnhead, St. Fillans and Comrie Railway Act 1897	60 & 61 Vict. c. ccxix	6 August 1897
An Act for incorporating the Lochearnhead St. Fillans and Comrie Railway Company and authorising the Construction of a Railway from Lochearnhead to Comrie in the County of Perth and for other purposes.
London County Council (Money) Act 1897 (repealed)	60 & 61 Vict. c. ccxx	6 August 1897
An Act to regulate the Expenditure of Money by the London County Council on Capital Account during the current financial period and the raising of Money to meet such Expenditure. (Repealed by London County Council (Finance Consolidation) Act 1912 (2 & 3 Geo. 5. c. cv))
Newburgh and North Fife Railway Act 1897	60 & 61 Vict. c. ccxxi	6 August 1897
An Act for making a Railway in the County of Fife to be called the Newburgh and North Fife Railway and for other purposes.
New River Company's Act 1897	60 & 61 Vict. c. ccxxii	6 August 1897
An Act to confer further Powers upon the Governor and Company of the New River brought from Chadwell and Amwell to London commonly called the New River Company for the execution of New Works and the raising of Further Money and for other purposes.
North Eastern Railway Act 1897	60 & 61 Vict. c. ccxxiii	6 August 1897
An Act to confer additional powers upon the North Eastern Railway Company for the construction of Dock Works at Middlesbrough new Railways and other Works and the acquisition of additional lands and for other purposes.
Thames Tunnel (Greenwich to Millwall) Act 1897	60 & 61 Vict. c. ccxxiv	6 August 1897
An Act to empower the London County Council to make a Subway under the River Thames between Greenwich and Millwall and for other purposes connected therewith.
Woodhouse and Conisbrough Railway Act 1897 (repealed)	60 & 61 Vict. c. ccxxv	6 August 1897
An Act for the making and maintaining of the Woodhouse and Conisbrough Railway and for other purposes. (Repealed by Woodhouse and Conisbrough Railway (Abandonment) Act 1899 (62 & 63 Vict. c. xxii))
Swansea Improvements and Tramways Act 1897 (repealed)	60 & 61 Vict. c. ccxxvi	6 August 1897
An Act for conferring further Powers upon the Swansea Improvements and Tramways Company with respect to their Tramways Undertaking and for other purposes. (Repealed by Swansea and District Transport Act 1936 (26 Geo. 5 & 1 Edw. 8. c. xxxix))
South Eastern Railway Act 1897	60 & 61 Vict. c. ccxxvii	6 August 1897
An Act for conferring further powers on the South Eastern Railway Company and for other purposes.
Baldock and Bygrave Benefices Union Act 1897	60 & 61 Vict. c. ccxxviii	6 August 1897
An Act to enable the Benefices of Baldock and Bygrave in the diocese of Saint Albans to be united.
Rhymney Valley Gas and Water Act 1897	60 & 61 Vict. c. ccxxix	6 August 1897
An Act to extend the period for the completion of the Waterworks authorised by the Rhymney Valley Gas and Water Act 1892. (Note: Rhymney Valley Gas and Water Act 1892 (55 & 56 Vict. c. cxc))
Bristol Corporation Act 1897	60 & 61 Vict. c. ccxxx	6 August 1897
An Act to extend the City and County of Bristol and for other purposes.
Fylde Waterworks (Transfer) Act 1897 (repealed)	60 & 61 Vict. c. ccxxxi	6 August 1897
An Act to constitute and incorporate a joint Water Board consisting of representatives from the Councils of the Borough of Blackpool and the Urban Districts of Fleetwood Lytham and Saint Anne's-on-the-Sea all in the County Palatine of Lancaster and to transfer to and vest in such Board the undertaking of the Fylde Waterworks Company and for other purposes. (Repealed by County of Lancashire Act 1984 (c. xxi))
Harrogate Waterworks Act 1897	60 & 61 Vict. c. ccxxxii	6 August 1897
An Act for conferring further powers on the Harrogate Waterworks Company for the construction of Works and the raising of Capital and for other purposes.
South Eastern Railway (Confirmation of Cator Agreement) Act 1897	60 & 61 Vict. c. ccxxxiii	6 August 1897
An Act to confirm an Agreement made between Albemarle Cator and others and the South Eastern Railway Company.
Lincoln and East Coast Railway and Dock Act 1897 (repealed)	60 & 61 Vict. c. ccxxxiv	6 August 1897
An Act for incorporating the Lincoln and East Coast Railway and Dock Company to transfer to the Company some of the powers of the Lancashire Derbyshire and East Coast Railway Company to construct and maintain Railways and Works and to transfer to the Company certain portions of the undertaking of the said Company including the North Sea Fisheries (East Lincolnshire) Harbour and Dock together with the powers of the Lancashire Derbyshire and East Coast Company in relation thereto to confer additional powers upon the Company with reference to the portions of the undertaking transferred to them and for other purposes. (Repealed by Lincoln and East Coast Railway and Dock (Abandonment) Act 1902 (2 Edw. 7. c. iii))
Dublin United Tramways (New Lines) Act 1897	60 & 61 Vict. c. ccxxxv	6 August 1897
An Act to empower the Dublin United Tramways Company to construct new Tramways and for other purposes.
Dublin United Tramways (Electrical Power) Act 1897	60 & 61 Vict. c. ccxxxvi	6 August 1897
An Act to authorise the Use of Electrical Power on the Tramways of the Dublin United Tramways Company and for other purposes.
Harrogate Corporation (Waterworks Transfer) Act 1897 (repealed)	60 & 61 Vict. c. ccxxxvii	6 August 1897
An Act to authorise the Mayor Aldermen and Burgesses of the Borough of Harrogate to purchase the Undertaking of the Harrogate Waterworks Company and for other purposes. (Repealed by Harrogate Stray Act 1985 (c. xxii))
Nottingham Improvement Act 1897	60 & 61 Vict. c. ccxxxviii	6 August 1897
An Act to confer further powers upon the Corporation of Nottingham with respect to Street Improvements Tramways and various matters of local government and for other purposes.
North Metropolitan Tramways Act 1897	60 & 61 Vict. c. ccxxxix	6 August 1897
An Act for empowering the North Metropolitan Tramways Company to construct New Tramways in the Counties of London Essex and Middlesex for confirming certain Agreements between that Company and the London Street Tramways Company and the London County Council with respect to the sale and purchase and leasing working and using of Tramways and for other purposes.
Weston-super-Mare Tramways Act 1897	60 & 61 Vict. c. ccxl	6 August 1897
An Act for incorporating the Weston-super-Mare Tramways Company and authorising them to make and maintain Tramways and other Works at Weston-super-Mare and for other purposes.
Manchester Corporation Act 1897	60 & 61 Vict. c. ccxli	6 August 1897
An Act to confer further powers upon the Mayor Aldermen and Citizens of the City of Manchester in the County of Lancaster for the construction of Works and the Acquisition of Lands to enable them to work and use their Tramways by means of electrical or other mechanical power to enlarge their powers as to the supply of electricity to alter their corporate title and for other purposes.
London County Council (Improvements) Act 1897	60 & 61 Vict. c. ccxlii	6 August 1897
An Act to empower the London County Council to make a new Street and Street Improvements in the Administrative County of London.
Dearne Valley Railway Act 1897	60 & 61 Vict. c. ccxliii	6 August 1897
An Act for incorporating the Dearne Valley Railway Company and for other purposes.
Southwark and Vauxhall Water Act 1897	60 & 61 Vict. c. ccxliv	6 August 1897
An Act to confer certain powers upon the Southwark and Vauxhall Water Company.
Hull and South Yorkshire Extension Railway Act 1897	60 & 61 Vict. c. ccxlv	6 August 1897
An Act for incorporating the Hull and South Yorkshire Extension Railway Company and for other purposes.
Coventry Electric Tramways Act 1897 (repealed)	60 & 61 Vict. c. ccxlvi	6 August 1897
An Act to incorporate the Coventry Electric Tramways Company and to empower that Company to make and maintain Tramways and for other purposes. (Repealed by West Midlands County Council Act 1980 (c. xi))
Metropolitan District Railway Act 1897	60 & 61 Vict. c. ccxlvii	6 August 1897
An Act for empowering the Metropolitan District Railway Company to construct an Underground Railway from near Earl's Court Station to the Mansion House Station City to authorise them to work that railway and their existing railway by electricity to extend the time limited for the completion of the Acton Junction Railway of the Company and for the compulsory purchase of lands for and for the completion of the Ealing and South Harrow Railway and for other purposes.
Great Western Railway (Additional Powers) Act 1897	60 & 61 Vict. c. ccxlviii	6 August 1897
An Act for conferring further powers upon the Great Western Railway Company in respect of their own undertaking and upon that Company and the London and North Western Railway Company in respect of undertakings in which they are jointly interested and upon the Lambourn Valley Railway Company in respect of their undertaking for amalgamating the Buckfastleigh Totnes and South Devon Kington and Eardisley Woodstock Banbury and Cheltenham Direct Pembroke and Tenby Nantwich and Market Drayton Minehead and Great Marlow Railway Companies with the Great Western Railway Company and for other purposes.
Kingston-upon-Hull Corporation Act 1897	60 & 61 Vict. c. ccxlix	6 August 1897
An Act for extending the Boundaries of the City and County of Kingston-upon-Hull for conferring on the Corporation power to construct a new Bridge over the River Hull and power to make new Streets and further powers with respect to a Crematory Rating the Supply of Gas and other matters for consolidating the provisions of the Water Acts and Orders now in force in the City and County and for other purposes.
Highgate Woods Preservation Act 1897	60 & 61 Vict. c. ccl	6 August 1897
An Act to authorise the acquisition of Lands known as Churchyard Bottom Wood Highgate for the purposes of a public open space.
Watford, Edgware and London Railway Act 1897	60 & 61 Vict. c. ccli	6 August 1897
An Act for incorporating the Watford Edgware and London Railway Company and for empowering them to construct Railways from Watford in the County of Hertford to Edgware in the County of Middlesex and for other purposes.
London County Council (General Powers) Act 1897	60 & 61 Vict. c. cclii	6 August 1897
An Act to empower the London County Council to make certain Street Improvements and to purchase Lands for various purposes to make provision for Contributions in certain cases by Local Authorities and as to the admission of Sewage into the Metropolitan Main Drainage System from a portion of East Ham in the County of Essex and for other purposes.
City of Birmingham Tramways Act 1897	60 & 61 Vict. c. ccliii	6 August 1897
An Act for authorising the City of Birmingham Tramways Company Limited to construct additional Tramways and for other purposes.
Norwich Electric Tramways Act 1897	60 & 61 Vict. c. ccliv	6 August 1897
An Act to incorporate the Norwich Electric Tramways Company and to empower that Company to make and maintain Tramways and for other purposes.
Salford Corporation Act 1897	60 & 61 Vict. c. cclv	6 August 1897
An Act to enable the Mayor Aldermen and Burgesses of the County Borough of Salford to construct additional Tramways to make a Street Improvement and to raise additional Moneys by mortgage and by the creation and issue of Stock and to make further provisions with respect to Booth's Charities and for the good government of the Borough.
Harrow and Uxbridge Railway Act 1897	60 & 61 Vict. c. cclvi	6 August 1897
An Act for incorporating the Harrow and Uxbridge Railway Company, and authorising them to construct a Railway in the County of Middlesex, and for other purposes.
Whitechapel and Bow Railway Act 1897	60 & 61 Vict. c. cclvii	6 August 1897
An Act for making a Railway to be called the Whitechapel and Bow Railway and for other purposes.
Cowes Harbour Act 1897	60 & 61 Vict. c. cclviii	6 August 1897
An Act to incorporate Harbour Commissioners for the Harbour and Roads of Cowes in the Isle of Wight to define the limits of the Harbour and Roads to vest the Harbour in the Commissioners and to confer upon them powers for the improvement maintenance and regulation of the Harbour and Roads and for other purposes.
Colwyn Bay and Colwyn Urban District Council Act 1897 (repealed)	60 & 61 Vict. c. cclix	6 August 1897
An Act for conferring further powers on the Urban District Council of Colwyn Bay and Colwyn and for making further and better provisions for the improvement health and local government of the Urban District of Colwyn Bay and Colwyn and for other purposes. (Repealed by Clwyd County Council Act 1985 (c. xliv))
Bradford Tramways and Improvement Act 1897 or the Bradford Corporation Tramways and Improvement Act 1897	60 & 61 Vict. c. cclx	6 August 1897
An Act to authorise the Mayor Aldermen and Citizens of the City of Bradford in the County of York to construct additional Tramways to consolidate the townships in the City to extend the Bradford Union to make better provision for the health local government and improvement of the City and for other purposes.

=== Private and personal acts ===
Short title	Citation	Royal assent
Long title
Suttie's Trust Estate Act 1897	60 & 61 Vict. c. 1 Pr.	15 July 1897
An Act to vary the purposes of the Trust Disposition and Settlement of the late Robert Suttie Writer in Edinburgh to authorise the execution of the purposes as so varied and for other purposes.
Gonne Estate Act 1897	60 & 61 Vict. c. 2 Pr.	6 August 1897
An Act for ascertaining and determining the Estates Rights and Interests of the several persons interested in the Residuary Real and Personal Estate of Charles Gonne Esquire deceased and for modifying certain possible Interests thereby given to unascertained and (at present) unascertainable Persons.
Thompson's Divorce Act 1897 (Note: This act was not printed by the Queen's Printer.)	60 & 61 Vict. c. 3 Pr.	8 April 1897
An Act to dissolve the Marriage of Agnes Weir Thompson the wife of Abraham Thompson of Belfast in the County of Antrim Solicitor with the said Abraham Thompson and to enable her to marry again and for other purposes.
Peacocke's Divorce Act 1897	60 & 61 Vict. c. 4 Pr.	15 July 1897
An Act to dissolve the Marriage of Beatrice Anna Caroline Isabella Peacocke the wife of Leslie Tufnell Peacocke with the said Leslie Tufnell Peacocke and to enable her to marry again and for other purposes.
Sinclair's Divorce Act 1897	60 & 61 Vict. c. 5 Pr.	6 August 1897
An Act to dissolve the Marriage of Alfred Law Sinclair of Holyhill Strabane County Tyrone a Lieutenant Colonel in the Indian Staff Corps with Isabella Sinclair his wife and to enable him to marry again and for other purposes.
Vanston's Divorce Act 1897	60 & 61 Vict. c. 6 Pr.	6 August 1897
An Act to dissolve the Marriage of the Reverend William Samuel Vanston of 111 Rathgar Road in the County of Dublin Clerk in Holy Orders with Henrietta Maria Vanston his now wife and to enable him to marry again and for other purposes.

=== Sources ===
- The Public General Statutes, Volume 34: 60 & 61 Victoria – 1897. 1897 – via Internet Archive.
- Local and Personal Acts – via Google Books.

== See also ==
- List of acts of the Parliament of the United Kingdom
