= Willerby and Kirk Ella railway station =

Disused railway station in the East Riding of Yorkshire, England

Willerby and Kirk Ella
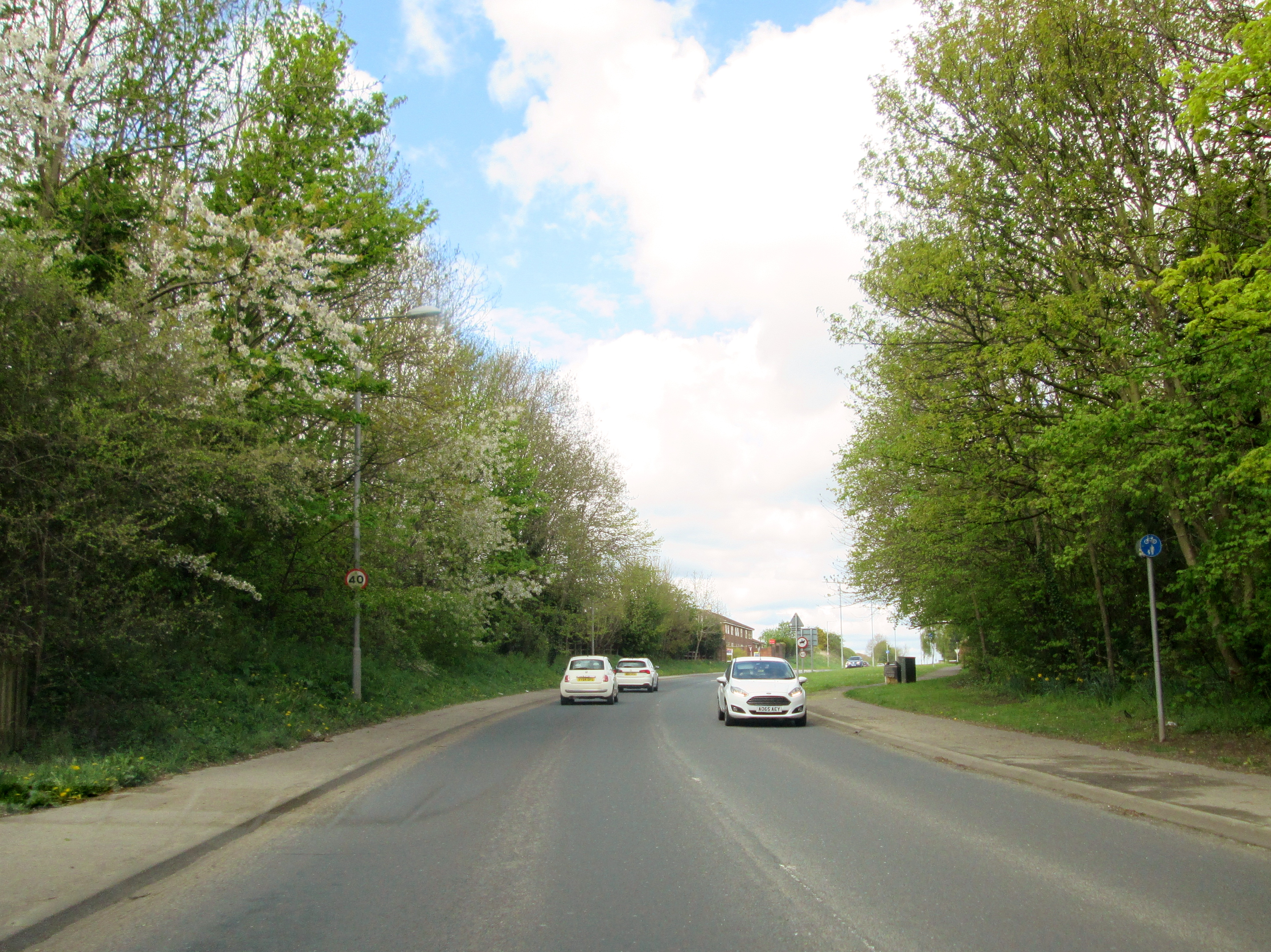
- Willerby and Kirk Ella station was located on the embankment left of today's B1232 road. After the bend, the new road follows the former alignment of the railway.

General information
- Location: Willerby, East Riding of Yorkshire; England
- Coordinates: 53.757600°N 0.448000°W
- Grid reference: TA024301
- Platforms: 2

Other information
- Status: Disused

History
- Original company: Hull, Barnsley and West Riding Junction Railway
- Pre-grouping: Hull and Barnsley Railway
- Post-grouping: London and North Eastern Railway

Key dates
- 1885: opened
- 1 August 1955: closed for passengers
- 6 July 1964: closed for freight
Location

Willerby and Kirk Ella railway station was a station on the Hull and Barnsley Railway, and served the villages of Willerby and Kirk Ella in the East Riding of Yorkshire, England.

The station opened on 27 July 1885. It was located west of the junction of Carr Lane and Main Street, partly on an embankment. The station building was designed in the English domestic revival style. The goods yard with a loop and two sidings served a cattle dock, pens and a coal yard. Kirk Ella limeworks had a private siding branching off the line between Little Weighton and Willerby. The station closed to passengers on 1 August 1955 and to freight on 6 July 1964. It was subsequently demolished and the area redeveloped for housing purposes. A road was built over the track alignment northwest of the station, and a car park southeast of it.

Preceding station	Disused railways	Following station
Little Weighton	Hull and Barnsley Railway	Beverley Road
Little Weighton	Hull and Barnsley Railway	Springhead Halt
