= Springhead Halt railway station =

Disused railway station in the East Riding of Yorkshire, England

Springhead Halt

General information
- Location: Anlaby, East Riding of Yorkshire; England
- Coordinates: 53.749200°N 0.427500°W
- Grid reference: TA037293
- Platforms: 2

Other information
- Status: Disused

History
- Original company: London and North Eastern Railway
- Post-grouping: London and North Eastern Railway

Key dates
- 1929: opened
- 1955: closed
Location

Springhead Halt railway station was a station on the former Hull and Barnsley Railway, close to the hamlet of Wolfreton; it served the village of Anlaby in the East Riding of Yorkshire, England.

The station opened on 8 April 1929 and closed on 1 August 1955.

The station had two 25-foot-long (7.6 m) wooden platforms.

Preceding station	Disused railways	Following station
Willerby and Kirk Ella	London and North Eastern Railway; Hull and Barnsley Railway	Beverley Road
