= Sugar Loaf Tunnel =

Disused railway tunnel in Yorkshire, England

Coordinates: 53°47′18″N 0°33′50″W

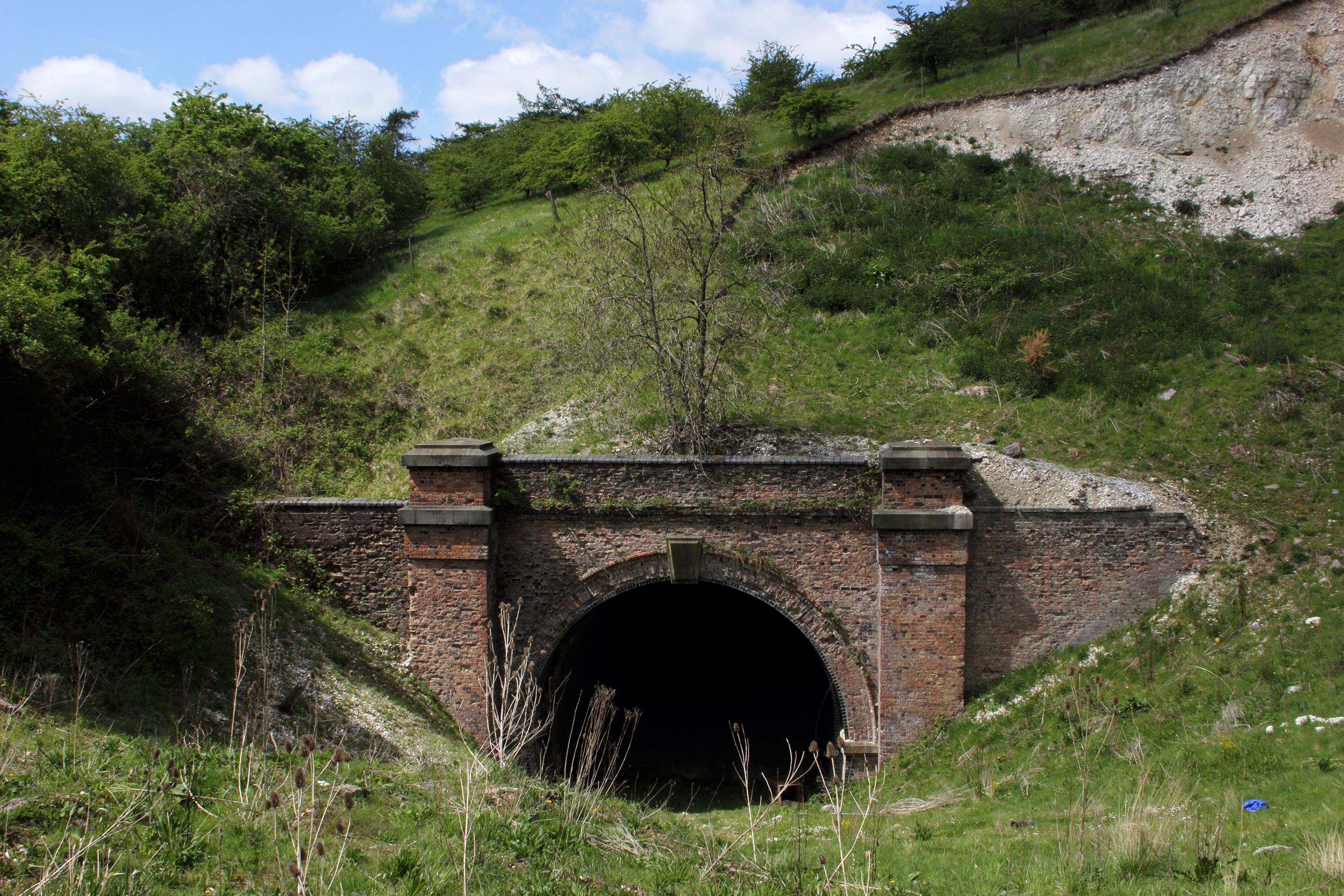
Sugar Loaf Tunnel, 25 May 2013

Sugar Loaf Tunnel is a disused railway tunnel on the former Hull and Barnsley Railway between Everthorpe and Little Weighton. The tunnel is 132 yards (121 m) long and was built through magnesian limestone of Permian age, referred to locally as "chalk". The bore has been cleared of rubble but quarrying is threatening the eastern portal and chalk has now encroached to within twenty yards of the tunnel. The tunnel is in very poor condition although access remains at both ends.

Sugar Loaf Tunnel lies to the west of the much longer Drewton Tunnel and east of Weedley Tunnel.

There is also a Sugar Loaf Tunnel on the Heart of Wales/Central Wales line near Sugar Loaf railway station, this is 1,001-yard (915 m) long and remains in use.
