= Long Drax swing bridge =

Former bridge on the River Ouse

Coordinates: 53.744333°N 0.961835°W

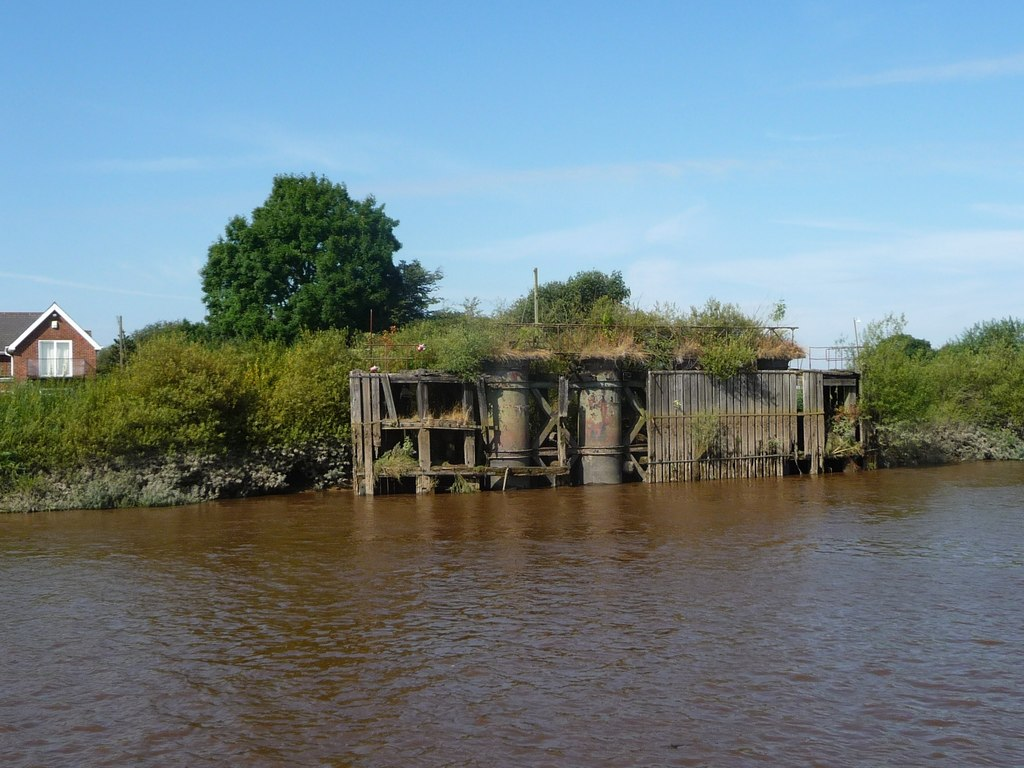
Abutments of the dismantled bridge, in 2016

The Long Drax swing bridge (also known as the Hull and Barnsley railway Ouse swing bridge) was a swing bridge on the River Ouse near Barmby on the Marsh and Drax, built in the 1880s for the Hull and Barnsley Railway (HBR). The bridge was dismantled in the late 1970s.

== History and description ==
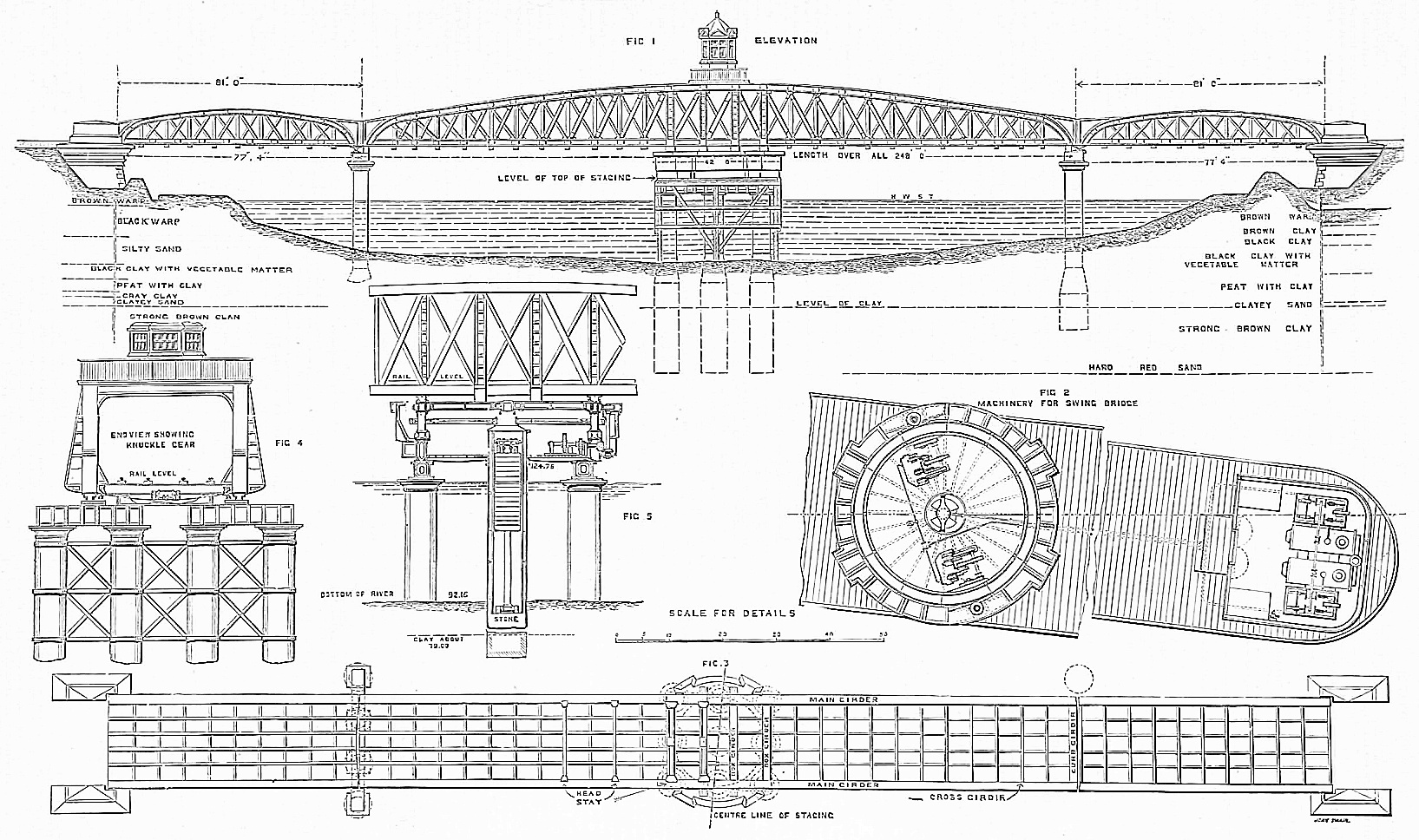
Cross sections and elevations (The Engineer, 25 January 1884)

The bridge was built as part of the construction of the Hull and Barnsley Railway (opened 1885); it consisted of three spans; two 81 ft (25 m) bowstring lattice girder approach spans, and a central swinging span of 248 ft (76 m) also of lattice girder design, with a central operating cabin at the swing bridge centre located above the track. The riverside foundations were masonry whilst the inner approach span foundations were each of four piers, and the swing span centre foundations of a square of nine piers. The weight of the iron in the superstructure of the bridge (including approach spans) was 648 long tons (658 t).

The swing bridge gave two river openings of 100 ft, and carried two railway tracks. Opening of the bridge was powered by hydraulic machinery, two three cylinder hydraulic motors drove the rotation of the swing span; a hydraulic accumulator was located in the central pier of the nine bridge span piers.

The bridge ironwork was built by Messrs. Handyside of Derby, and hydraulic machinery was supplied by company of Armstrong, Mitchell and Company, for the civil engineering company Lucas and Aird. The HBR's engineers were W. Shelford and G. Bohn.

The bridge was first swung on 6 August 1884.

The Hull and Barnsley Railway line closed in 1968. The bridge was maintained until 1968 in case of future re-use, but was dismantled by Kelsall (Demolitions) Limited in 1976/7.
