= Beverley 20 =

14-mile footpath in northern England

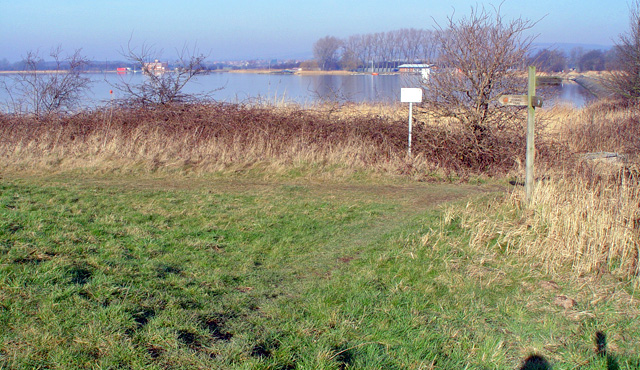
- At Welton
- Length: 16 mi (26 km)
- Location: East Riding of Yorkshire, England
- Designation: UK National Trail
- Trailheads: Beverley Minster, East Riding of Yorkshire; Humber Bridge, East Riding of Yorkshire
- Use: Hiking
- Elevation change: 252 m (827 ft)
- Highest point: 110 m (360 ft)

The Beverley 20 is a walk in the East Riding of Yorkshire that runs between Beverley Minster and the Humber Bridge that pass through the local villages of Skidby and North Ferriby. It also clips the edge of Walkington.

The paths themselves are also used by other longer routes. The section from the Humber Bridge to North Ferriby is used by the Yorkshire Wolds Way, High Hunsley Circuit and the Trans Pennine Trail.

The Beverley 20 is the first stage of a four-part walk from The Humber Bridge to Filey, The East Riding Heritage Trail.
