= Weedley Tunnel =

Railway tunnel in England

Coordinates: 53.7861°N 0.5821°W

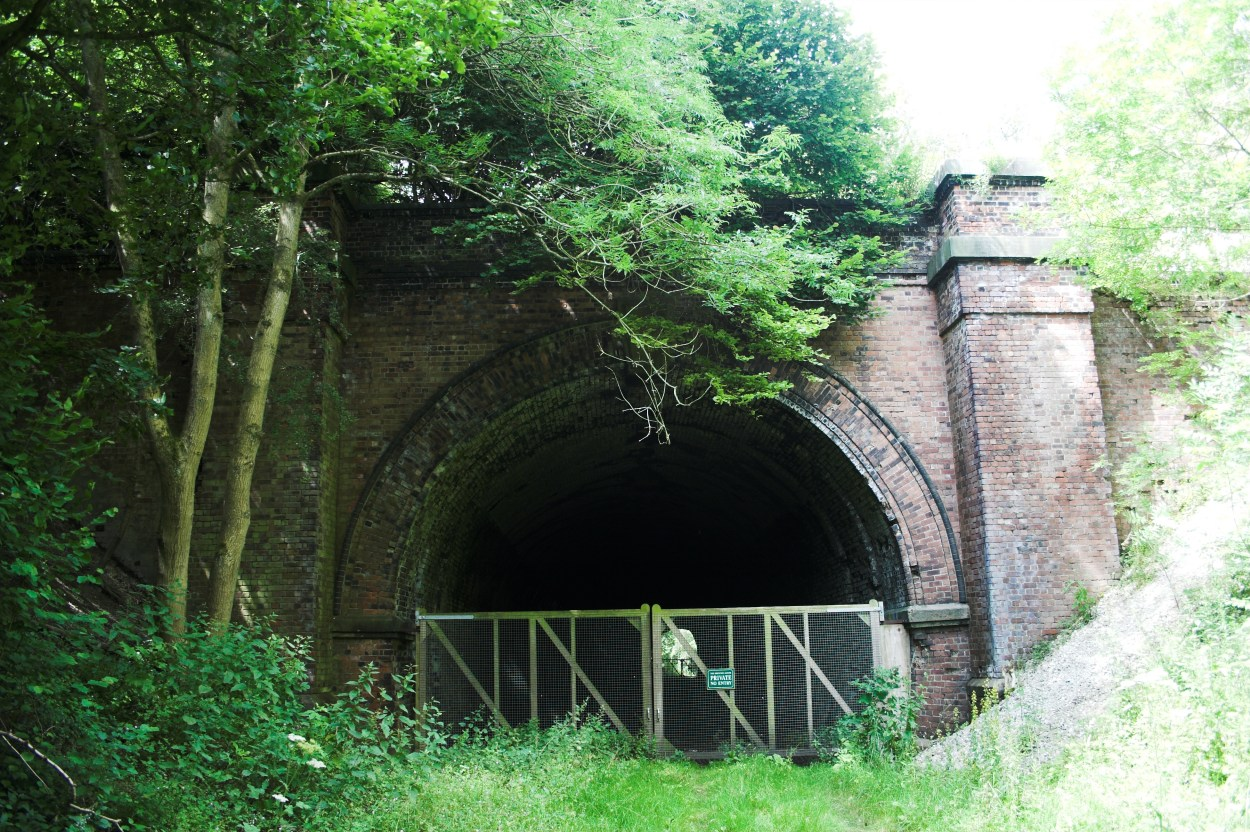
Weedley Tunnel, eastern portal, July 2012

Weedley Tunnel at grid reference SE 935 331 is a disused tunnel on the former Hull and Barnsley Railway. Weedley Tunnel is 132 yards (121 m) long with a slight curvature. It was originally built to carry two tracks. Access to the tunnel is now restricted, as gates were installed on both portals in 2010. The tunnel is cut through chalk and brick lined throughout and is in relatively good condition when compared to Sugar Loaf Tunnel further east and the much longer Drewton Tunnel.

Weedley Tunnel is now used as an access route for the Drewton Estate.
