= Alexandra Dock engine shed (Hull) =

Alexandra Dock
- Interactive map of Alexandra Dock

Location
- Location: Hull, United Kingdom
- Coordinates: 53°44′48″N 0°17′38″W
- OS grid: TA126291

Characteristics
- Type: Locomotive

History
- Opened: July 1885
- Closed: October 1963
- Original: Hull and Barnsley Railway
- Pre-grouping: HBR
- Post-grouping: LNER
- BR region: North Eastern

Alexandra Dock engine shed (Hull) was an engine shed located in Kingston upon Hull, Yorkshire, England and was opened by the Hull and Barnsley Railway in July 1885. The shed was closed by British Railways in October 1963 although the site remained in use as a stabling point and signing on point for drivers until rail traffic ceased to the dock in 1982.

== Early days (1885-1922) ==
The Hull Barnsley and West Riding Junction Railway and Dock Company (HBR) was primarily a coal railway and Alexandra Dock was its gateway for exporting it. Opened on 16 July 1885 rail traffic started on 20 July 1885 although presumably the shed was at least partially operative before then. The initial allocation to the shed consisted of 12 0-6-0T engines and these were supplemented by six smaller 0-4-0T engines better suited to the sharp curves in the dock area. All of these locomotives spent most of their working lives in the dock area with occasional visits to Springhead where the HBR's works and a larger locomotive shed were located. At Springhead heavier maintenance and repairs were carried out.

In 1905 the Hull Barnsley and West Riding Junction Railway and Dock Company officially changed its name to the shorter Hull and Barnsley Railway.

The shed was a wooden building with two tracks and about half the allocation could be stabled under cover. The shed was never improved in any way. By 1913 this structure was considered beyond repair but the intervention of the First World War saw the shed reprieved. In 1922 the HBR was absorbed by the North Eastern Railway and the 22 HBR shunters were scrapped and replaced by an allocation of NER locomotives consisting of:

Class (LNER classification)	Wheel Arrangement	Number allocated
J71	0-6-0T	7
J74	0-6-0T	8
J75	0-6-0T	4
J76	0-6-0T	1
Y1	0-4-0T	5

== London and North Eastern Railway (1923-1947) ==
Following the Railways Act 1921 the NER became part of the London and North Eastern Railway (LNER) on 1 January 1923 although there was no change to the locomotives allocated to the shed.

The engine shed building still survived although a photograph taken in 1925 indicates the roof was in a parlous state. High winds in December 1927 saw the shed acquire a precarious lean and inevitably demolition followed in 1928. The location still continued as an engine shed in name with the limited office facilities housed in an old passenger vehicle and all locomotives stabled out in the open.

Two new classes of LNER locomotives were allocated to the shed in the 1930s. In 1937 some members of Class J73 were allocated whilst in 1939 J72 0-6-0T locomotives displaced the J71s.

== British Railways (1948-1961) ==
Following nationalisation the shed became part of the North Eastern Region of British Railways, and under the British Railways shed numbering scheme Alexandra Dock (Springhead) were allocated the code 53C. The first diesel locomotives (Class 11) were allocated to Alexandra Dock in 1954 followed by Class 08s the following year and the smaller Class 03s in 1960 which replaced the last J72 steam locomotives at the shed. The shed closed on 27 October 1963 and the final allocation was allocated to Hull Dairycoates depot. However the site was still used for stabling shunters and as a driver signing on point until the final decline of Alexandra Dock saw all rail traffic cease in 1982.
