= Hull Cannon Street railway station =

Disused railway station in Hull, England

Hull Cannon Street
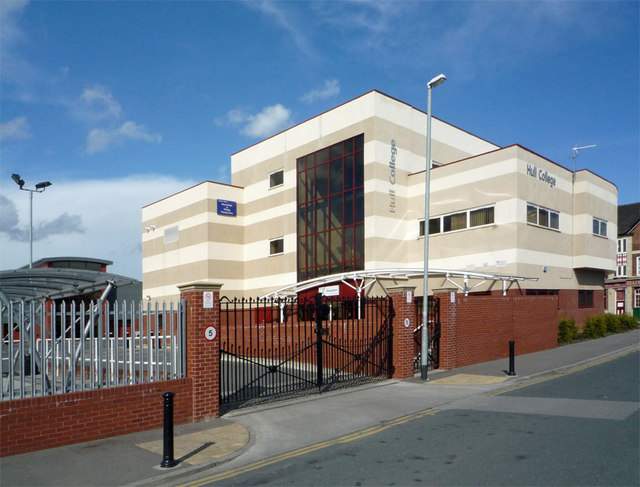
- Gates to the former station

General information
- Location: Hull, East Riding of Yorkshire; England
- Coordinates: 53.751926°N 0.337988°W
- Grid reference: TA097297
- Platforms: 3

Other information
- Status: Disused

History
- Original company: Hull, Barnsley and West Riding Junction Railway
- Pre-grouping: Hull and Barnsley Railway
- Post-grouping: London and North Eastern Railway

Key dates
- 1885: Opened
- 1924: Closed to passengers
- 1968: Closed for freight
Location

Hull Cannon Street railway station was the passenger terminus in Hull of the Hull, Barnsley and West Riding Junction Railway and Dock Company, which was rebranded in 1905 as the Hull and Barnsley Railway. It opened on 27 July 1885. The station was planned as a goods station only, and the passenger terminus should have been built one-quarter of a mile (0.4 km) south on Charlotte Street. Lack of funds meant that Cannon Street station had to serve both functions. Passenger services were provided in a converted building originally intended as a carriage shed.

Hull Cannon Street station closed to passengers on 14 July 1924, after the London and North Eastern Railway had built the Spring Bank chord to Hull Paragon, and passenger services were diverted there. It closed completely on 3 June 1968. The wooden passenger buildings had disappeared by the late 1970s, the goods office which stood parallel to the street was demolished after 2002. In 2005 Hull College has built motor vehicle workshops for training purposes on the site. Only one set of the iron entrance gates with the original company legend has been reused as the main entrance to the new facilities.

| Preceding station | Disused railways | Following station |
|---|---|---|
| Beverley Road | Hull and Barnsley Railway | Terminus |
