= Drewton Tunnel =

Railway tunnel in England

Coordinates: 53.7885°N 0.5417°W

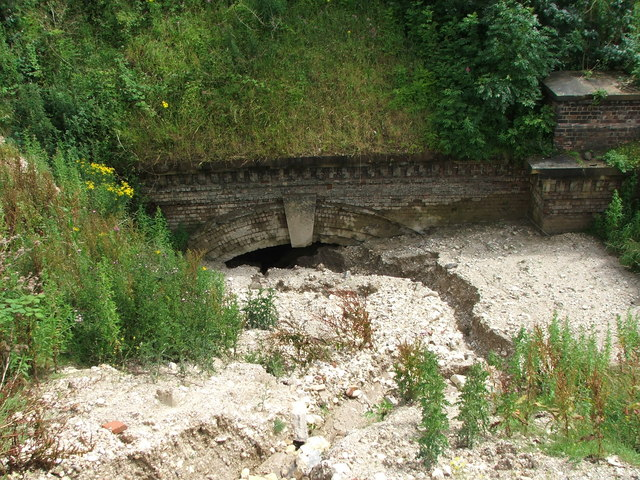
The west portal in 2007

Drewton Tunnel is a disused railway tunnel on the now closed Hull to Barnsley railway line - grid reference SE 952 335, western portal and SE 971 337, eastern portal. The tunnel is cut through chalk and the lining is a mix of bare chalk walls and brick. The first rail traffic used the tunnel in 1885. Drewton Tunnel is one of the longest disused tunnels in the United Kingdom at a length of 1 mile 354 yards (1.933 km), and lies to the east of the shorter Sugar Loaf Tunnel and Weedley Tunnel.

The western portal of Drewton Tunnel is almost entirely buried with landfill and is situated in a chalk quarry operated by Stoneledge. This end of the tunnel has considerable deposits of mud on the former trackbed washed in by rainfall as a result of local quarrying operations. The eastern portal remains open although is protected with a security fence. The tunnel regularly experiences chalkfalls as the lining inside deteriorates in the damp conditions.

The tunnel has five airshafts, the middle airshaft situated adjacent to Riplingham crossroads being the deepest. The area around this airshaft was used a temporary camp for navvies building the tunnel.

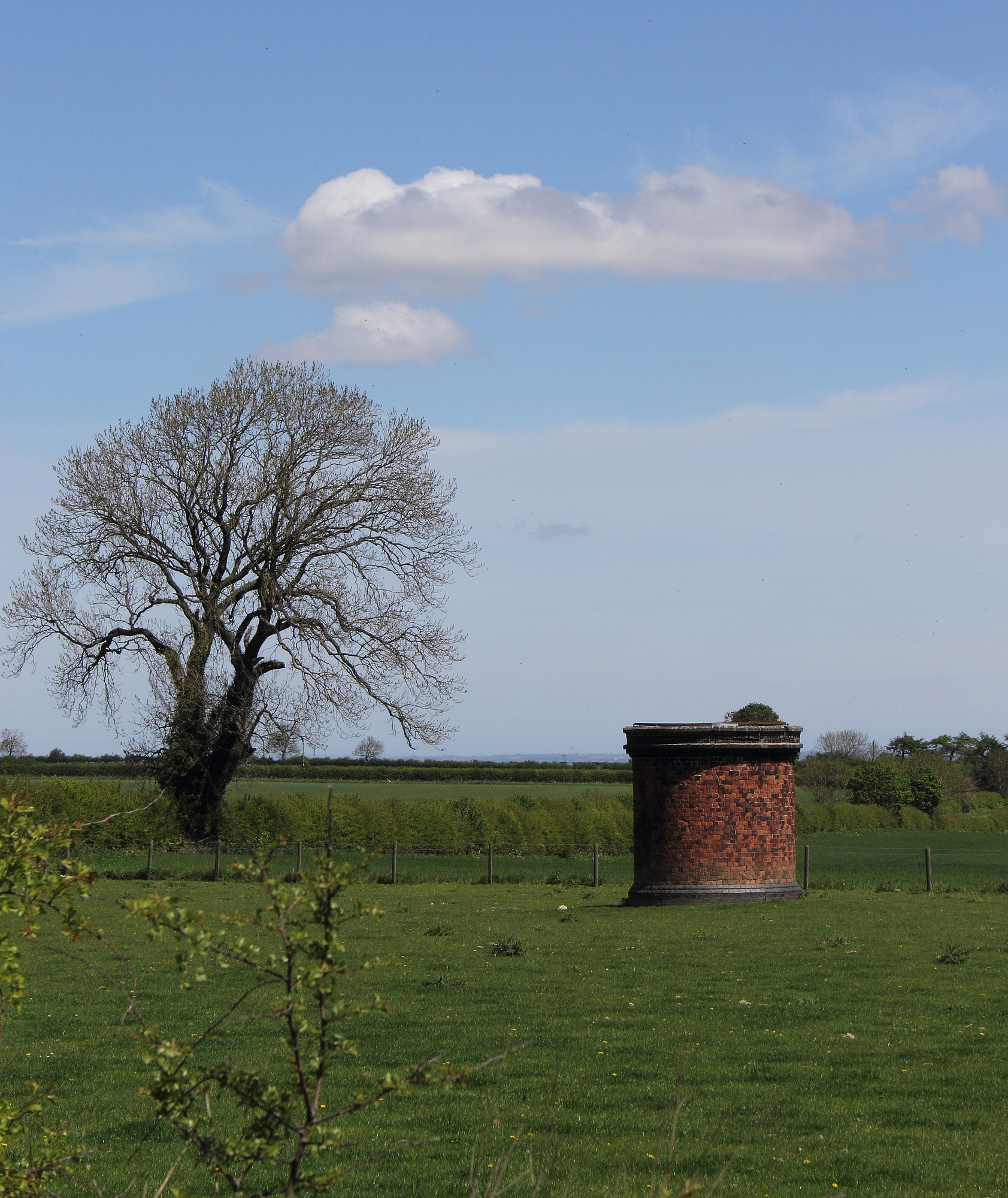
The third airshaft situated at Riplingham crossroads, 25 May 2013 grid reference SE 962 336

Drewton Tunnel was closed to rail traffic in 1958. Since closure landfill has threatened the eastern approaches to the tunnel. The 83 foot deep Little Weighton Cutting has been completely filled in, as have other areas of open space around the eastern portal. Despite its continual decay Drewton Tunnel is now home to a large number of bats.
