= Beverley Road railway station =

Disused railway station in the East Riding of Yorkshire, England

Beverley Road
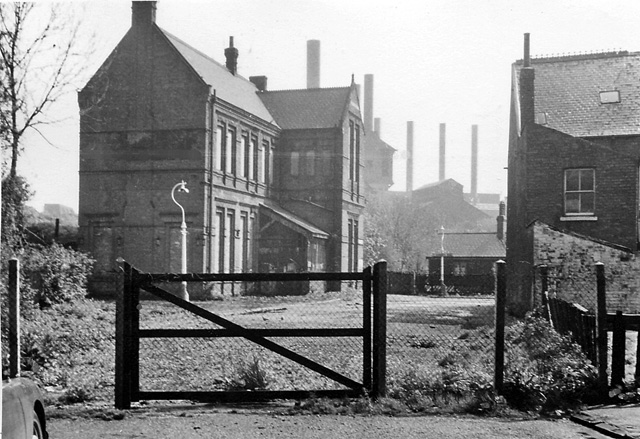
- Remnants of Beverley Road railway station in 1967

General information
- Location: Hull, East Riding of Yorkshire; England
- Coordinates: 53.762900°N 0.347000°W
- Grid reference: TA090309
- Platforms: 2

Other information
- Status: Disused

History
- Original company: Hull, Barnsley and West Riding Junction Railway
- Pre-grouping: Hull and Barnsley Railway
- Post-grouping: London and North Eastern Railway

Key dates
- 27 July 1885: Opened
- 14 July 1924: Closed
Location

Beverley Road railway station was a station on the Hull and Barnsley Railway, and served the Beverley Road area of Hull, East Riding of Yorkshire, England.

It opened on 27 July 1885 and closed to passengers on 14 July 1924 after the London and North Eastern Railway had built the Spring Bank chord to Hull Paragon.

Preceding station	Disused railways	Following station
Springhead Halt	Hull and Barnsley Railway	Hull Cannon Street
