= High Hunsley Circuit =

Walking route in Yorkshire, England

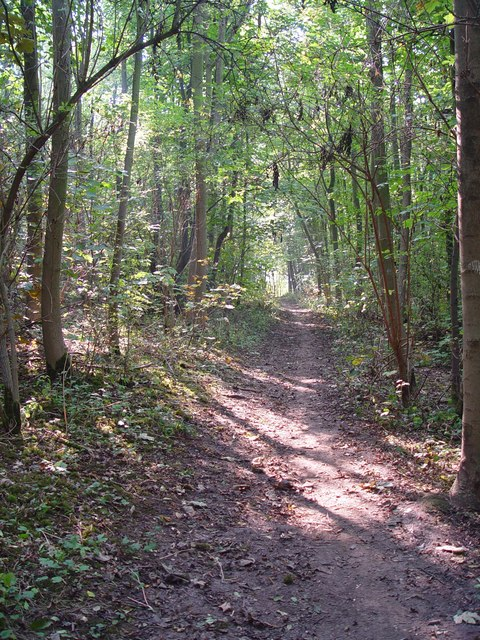
- The High Hunsley Circuit descending towards Elloughton Dale
- Length: 25.5 mi (41.0 km)
- Location: Yorkshire, England
- Use: Hiking
- Season: All year

The High Hunsley Circuit is a 25½ mile circular walk in the East Riding of Yorkshire, England that visits the villages of Walkington, Skidby, Brantingham, South Cave and Bishop Burton. The paths themselves are also used by other routes, Yorkshire Wolds Way and Beverley 20.
