= Hull and Barnsley Railway =

British pre-grouping railway company

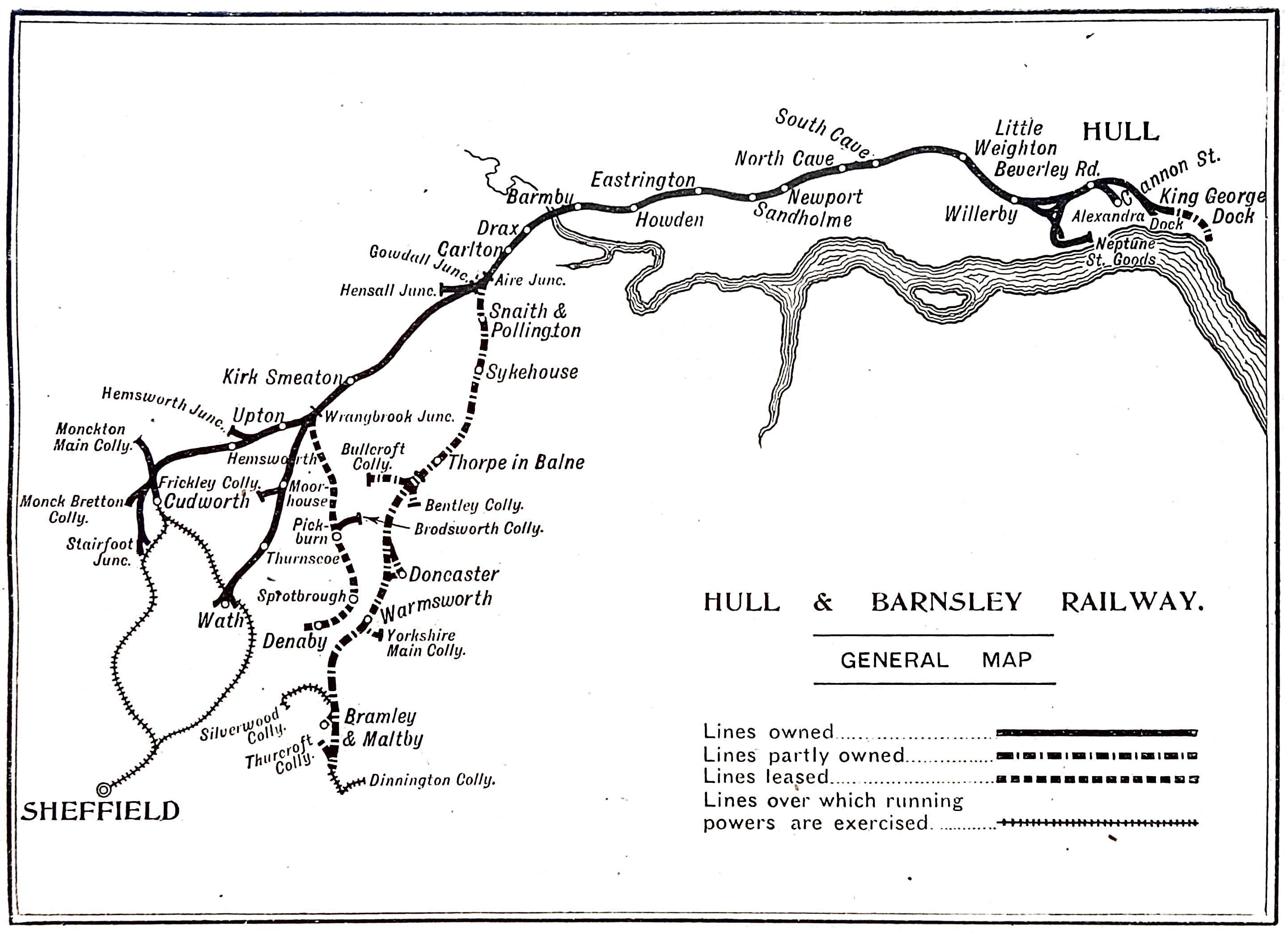
- 1920 map of the railway

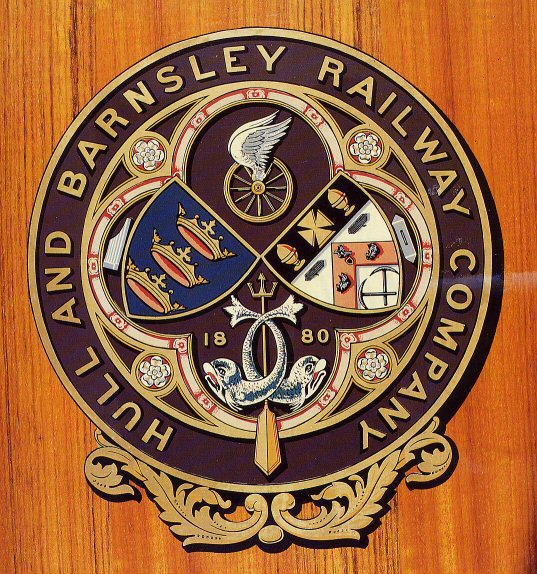
- The H&BR armorial device (Note: The devices are: (left) City of Kingston upon Hull crest, (right) Barnsley crest, (bottom) Dolphins representing the Hull docks, (above) A winged wheel. also embellisments include white roses representing Yorkshire.)

Overview
- Headquarters: Kingston upon Hull
- Dates of operation: 1880–1922
- Successors: NER, LNER

Technical
- Track gauge: 4 ft 8 1/2 in (1,435 mm)
- Length: 106 miles 33 chains (171.3 km) (1919)
- Track length: 366 miles 30 chains (589.6 km) (1919)

The Hull, Barnsley and West Riding Junction Railway and Dock Company (HB&WRJR&DCo.) was opened on 20 July 1885. It had a total projected length of 66 miles (106 kilometres) but never reached Barnsley, stopping a few miles short at Stairfoot. The name was changed to the Hull and Barnsley Railway (H&BR) in 1905. Its Alexandra Dock in Hull opened 16 July 1885.

The main line ran from Hull to Cudworth, with two other lines branching off at Wrangbrook Junction, the South Yorkshire Junction Railway to Denaby, and The Hull & South Yorkshire Extension Railway, an eight-mile (thirteen-kilometre) branch to Wath-upon-Dearne, opened 31 March 1902. The company also had joint running powers on the Hull and Barnsley and Great Central Joint Railway (Gowdall and Braithwell Railway).

Before the Grouping of 1923, the line was taken over by the North Eastern Railway (NER). Following incorporation into the London and North Eastern Railway (LNER), duplicated infrastructure was closed or reduced in function – notably Cannon Street station and the Springhead Locomotive Works.

Closure of the greater part of the main line itself came during the time of British Railways. As of 2011 the elevated line in Hull with some of the extensions and alterations added by the NER and LNER are still in use and referred to as the Hull Docks Branch and as the Engineer's Line Reference of HJS. (Note: HJS "Hessle Road Junction to Saltend")

== Background ==
By the 19th century the coalfields of southern Yorkshire were producing large amounts of coal, the industrialised midland region was making manufactured goods, and the new industrial towns of the West Riding of Yorkshire and of Lancashire were producing cloth and other goods. Thus opportunities for trade, export and profit existed along the east coast of England as well as along the Humber and the tributary rivers feeding it.

Goole had risen from nothing as a port on the Ouse with the creation of the Knottingley to Goole Canal in 1826 by the Aire and Calder Canal Company; the port, built to generous specifications rapidly gained inward and outward trade – much to the chagrin of Hull, and spurred the development of the extension of the Leeds and Selby Railway to Hull which opened in 1840. Additionally the North Eastern Railway – which had a monopoly on rail transport to Hull – prevented other rail companies investing there, and so Goole gained its own railway by the Wakefield, Pontefract and Goole Railway (later part of the Lancashire and Yorkshire Railway) in 1848. A custom-built railway dock and the use of specialised coal barges and unloading facilities, as well as the backing of the Aire and Calder Canal company, made it a very viable competitor to Hull for trade.

Additionally, as a competitor to the port of Hull (and equally well placed for European trade), Grimsby began to grow after the 1840s when the Ashton-under-Lyne and Manchester Railway Company built a rail connection, and the Royal Dock was completed in 1852.

Hull had expanded rapidly during the 18th century with shipping tonnages increasing over ten times in that period, and numerous docks supplementing and connecting Old Dock (Queen's Dock) being built by the Dock company in the 19th: Humber Dock 1809, Junction Dock (Prince's Dock) 1829, by 1846 Railway Dock connected to the Hull and Selby Railway (later part of the NER), as well as Victoria Dock (1850), Albert Dock (1869) and St Andrews Dock (1883). Despite all this activity, the Dock company was criticised for lack of action – specifically with regard to construction of facilities that would make Hull a foremost coal-exporting port. Additionally, the NER – whose interests in the north-east of England were in competition with Hull, and which held a monopoly on rail transport to Hull – was viewed with mistrust, suspicion, dissatisfaction and even hate, so much that schemes for independent railways or a company other than the NER were proposed that would build a line to Hull, including a bridge over, and tunnels under, the Humber were being actively promoted by Hull merchants.

The situation became untenable when, in 1872, with the NER refusing or unable to transport shipments from the port, deliveries of fish were delayed, and there was a general traffic jam on the rails: (Note: The running powers granted by the NER to the Manchester, Sheffield and Lincolnshire Railway to its goods depot at Kingston Street (1873) in Hull may have exacerbated the situation.(Goode 1992, p. 22))

"..the traffic overwhelmed the powers of the Railway Company; orders for supplies of goods could not be executed, vessels could not receive or discharge cargoes, and the general trade of the port was almost paralysed."

— prospectus for the Hull South and West Junction Railway., A History of Hull Railways, G. G. MacTurk, Chapter XV (F. B Grotrian)

Hull, Barnsley and West Riding Junction Railway and Dock Act 1880
- Act of Parliament
- Parliament of the United Kingdom
- Long title: An Act to authorise the construction and maintenance of the Hull, Barnsley, and West Riding Junction Railways, and of a Dock and other Works in connexion therewith; and for other purposes.
- Citation: 43 & 44 Vict. c. cxcix

Dates
- Royal assent: 26 August 1880

Text of statute as originally enacted

The plans finally found fruition in 1880 in the charge of Col. Gerald Smith (a Hull banker) and through the cooperation of the Hull Corporation (including the sale of land to the railway, and an investment of £100,000). As part of the Hull Corporation's involvement with the scheme came the power to veto any joint workings with other railway companies or selling or leasing of land, and despite the opposition of the NER (which had been instrumental in blocking previous plans), the parliamentary bill was passed with minor alterations as the Hull, Barnsley and West Riding Junction Railway and Dock Act 1880 (43 & 44 Vict. c. cxcix) on 26 August 1880. The Hull, Barnsley and West Riding Junction Railway and Dock Company (formed 1879) began work on the new line and associated deep-water dock which was completed by 1885.

== The HB&WRJ Railway and Dock Company ==
In full, the Hull, Barnsley and West Riding Junction Railway and Dock Company.

=== Construction (1880–1885) ===
For construction of the line Parliament authorised a share issue of £3,000,0000 and loans of £1,000,000. The engineer for the main line was William Shelford, whilst Stephen Best was responsible for the Hull section, and Benjamin Baker designed the Alexandra Dock. The contractors were Messrs. Lucas and Aird.

The line was one of the earlier built with the aid of steam navvies. The spoil excavated by men and machines from tunnels and cuttings was used to build embankments elsewhere Around 8,000 navvies, including both Scots and Irish as well as English, were employed in the constructions, the largest concentration of which was to be found at Riplingham (near to the Drewton tunnel). The average wage was 15 shillings for a 58-hour week.

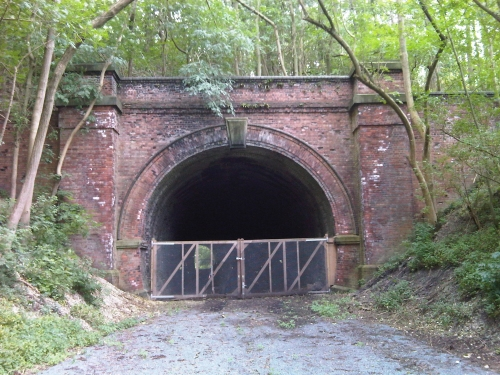
Eastern Portal: Weedley Tunnel, 2010

The Weedley Tunnel was not originally planned; the track was to skirt the hill to the south. However unstable ground meant that the line tunnelled through the hill instead. The South Kirkby tunnel passed through Magnesian Limestone to reach the lower beds of sandstone, and clay. Excavation of tunnels and cuttings included the practice of tunnelling into the rock, placing charges, then moving up the contractors wagons and detonating the charges so that the blasted rock would fall into the wagons.

One of the notable features of the line was the number of bridges it required, a result of the elevated nature of the Hull section where it crossed roads, waterways, and the line of the NER. Additionally, being built after the Railway Mania of the 1840s it had to cross numerous already existent lines in southern Yorkshire. Over one hundred bridges were required, with over 20 within the urban area of Hull alone. (Note: C. T. Goode in Railways of Hull quotes a figure of 35 within the town boundary (undated), whilst G.D. Parkes (The Hull and Barnsley Railway) notes nine substantial underline bridges ... in the first four miles. A survey using Ordnance Survey maps of the period shows that there were more than 20 within the urbanised area. Later developments in Hull led to the construction or alteration of further bridges.)

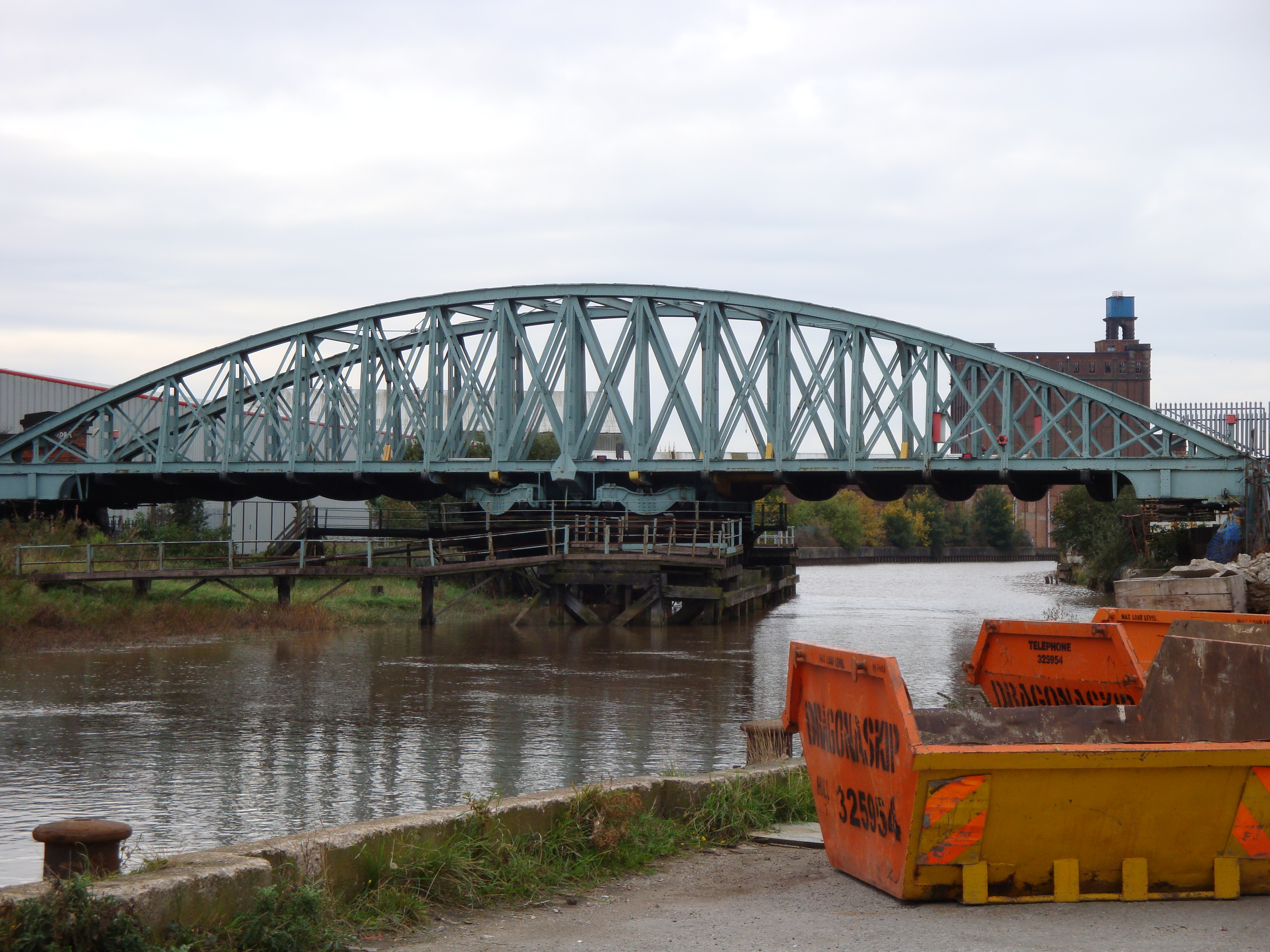
River Hull Bridge

The majority (eighty eight) of the bridges were of plate girder construction with usually three plate sides (one central) supporting cross-beams on which the track was supported. For longer spans a girder "N" truss design was used (Note: A close variation or example of the Pratt truss) These larger bridges incorporate rollers on one end to allow for the thermal expansion of the bridge. For other long spans, and for the two swing bridges on the line (Ouse and Hull bridges), open girder truss of approximately parabolic shape (open truss bowstring) were used. Both swing bridges were manufactured by Messrs. Handyside of Derby.

In addition to wrought iron bridges, brick arches were also used, both for crossing small dykes and country lanes, as well as the abutments to bridges and in place of embankments on short sections between bridges.

At Beverley Road, Willerby & Kirk Ella, North Cave and Wallingfen were two-storey buildings with the upper storey accessing the embanked track. Stations were built in the English Queen Anne revival style – with decorative external brick courses between floors and brick lintels; minor embellishments on other brick structures such as bridge buttresses roughly echoed the same style.

In July 1884 work stopped for five months, through a failure to raise funds through a share issue to pay the workers. Parliament allowed the additional debts to be taken for the work to continue, by completion the total share issue was £6,000,000 and the loans £3,500,000. At this point the line was almost complete but the subsequent cost cutting meant that the planned grand terminus close to the centre of Hull was never built.

=== Description of the Line and assets ===
==== Hull to Springhead ====
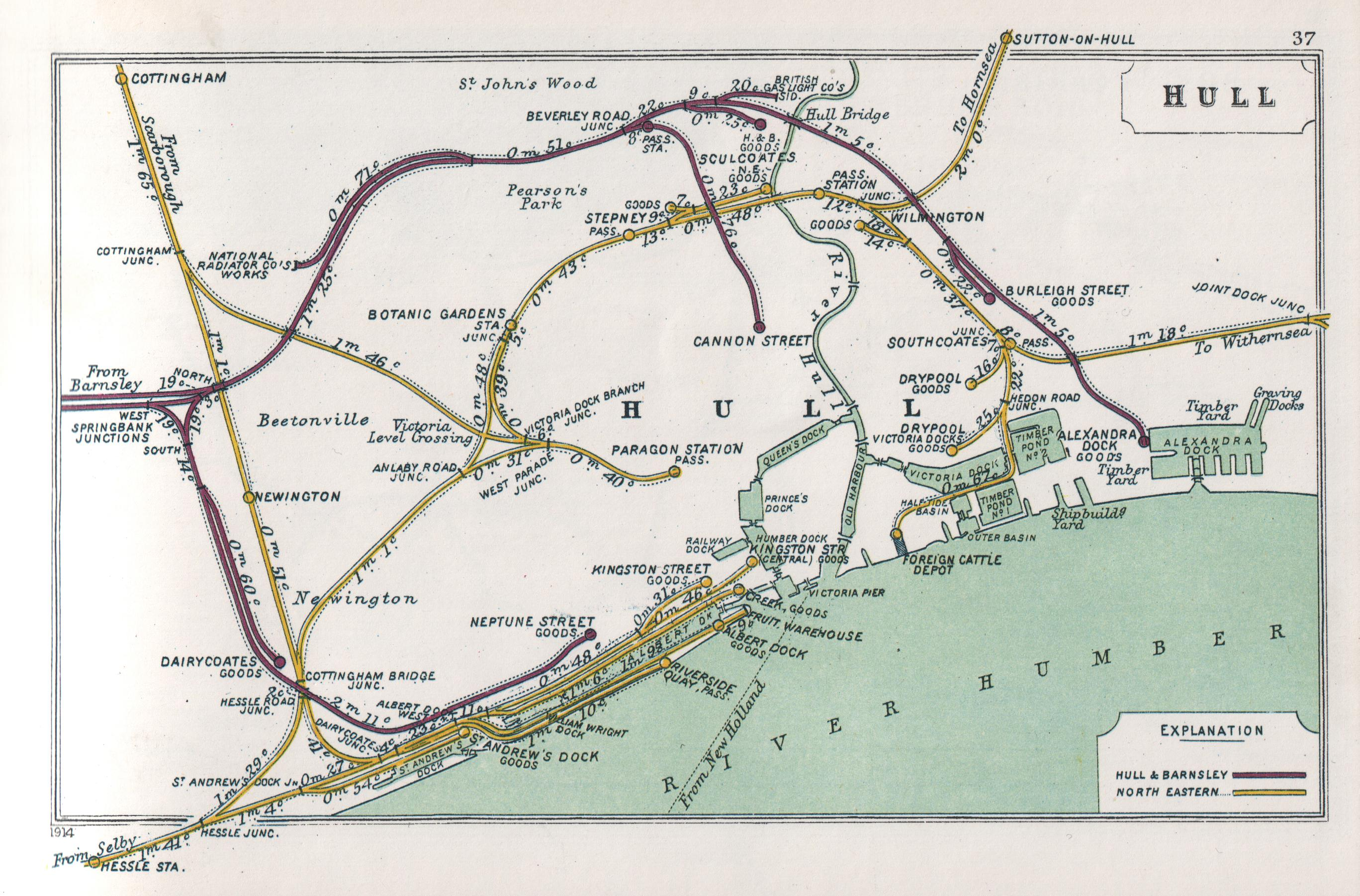
1914 Railway map of Hull. H&BR lines are shown in violet.

Much of the assets of the Hull Barnsley and West Riding Junction Railway and Dock Company lay in Hull. (Note: The term 'junction' in the company's name means that it was a line that connected at a railway junction, rather than reaching a destination such as a major city; this junction (or junctions) lay at the Barnsley end of the line, meaning that there was relatively little infrastructure at that end.) The line terminated in Hull at three main points: Alexandra Dock; for import and export of goods by sea, Cannon Street station (a goods station and also the passenger terminus), and Neptune Street goods station, the main goods terminus.

The HB&WRJR&DCo's main asset was Alexandra Dock. At the time of its construction it was the largest in Britain at 46 1/2 acres (18.8 hectares) and was expanded by 7 acres (3 hectares) in 1889. The entrance lock was 550 ft (170 m) long at 85 ft (26 m) wide. Two graving docks, one 500 ft (150 m) long and 60 ft (18 m) wide, the other a little bigger were also built at the north-east corner of the dock. Its primary purpose was the export of coal; in the opposite direction pit props, as well as cut wood were transported. Distances on the line (mileposts) were measured from Alexandra Dock, and the up direction was from Hull to Barnsley. From here the track rose, joining the embankment, and crossed Hedon Road, (Note: Hedon Road, now a section of the A1033) beginning its curved route round Hull by numerous bridges, crossing roads, drains, and the North Eastern Railway's own track, the first major crossing after Hedon Road being the NER's Hull to Withernsea Line. Next was a minor goods yard situated at Burleigh Street, then the Foredyke Stream (a drainage canal) and the NER's Hull to Hornsea Line were crossed close together. The line then crossed the River Hull at the Hull Bridge, and then branches (from the down direction) serving Sculcoates goods yard (southward) and the British Gas Light Company's gas works (northward). Westward from Sculcoates goods yard a spur ran backwards to serve Hull Corporation's own electricity power plant (opened 1895). After Sculcoates junction and the Beverley and Barmston Drain came Beverley Road junction where the line from Cannon Street station coming from the south-east joined the westward-travelling main line.

The branch to Cannon Street station first passed Beverley Road station, almost immediately after the junction. Beverley Road station was a two-storey building with the upper storey accessing the embanked track. (Note: The far side platforms at Beverley Road were accessed by a brick-lined (and tiled?) passenger tunnel (subway) under the embankment, still in existence in 2010 but closed.) The line then curved south and after a 1 in 50 descent reached the level again and terminated at Cannon Street. Initially Cannon Street was intended to be a carriage shed with the main station building situated closer to the centre of town at Charlotte Street near Kingston Square where the company's offices where located. Lack of funds, and the expense of purchasing expensive real estate in the centre of the town meant that Cannon Street became the main terminus. The station was in one of the most densely populated areas of the town, close to the river and its associated seed oil and varnish works, the buildings being quickly constructed of wood, and surrounded by the company's own coal yards, all of which would have given a poor impression compared with the facilities offered by the NER.

From Beverley Road junction the main line continued west crossing Newland Avenue, and the NER's Hull to Cottingham Line before reaching a triangle of track (or Wye) where a line turned south to terminate at Neptune Street goods station.

Before reaching Neptune Street, after a branch to a smaller goods station at Dairycoates to the east of the north–south track, the line curved east and crossed the NER's main line to Paragon Station at Hessle Road junction by an open girder truss bowstring bridge.

From the wye of track at Springbank junctions on the route towards Barnsley the line continued west past the Springhead works. The works were built on green-field land north of the main line outside the then area of urbanisation of Hull, and expanded considerably post opening. At Springhead, south of the main line, there was a through goods loop which also gave access to a considerable area of sidings operated from 1908 onwards. From the Springhead yard Hull Corporation's Springhead Waterworks was supplied with coal to power its steam-driven pumping engine.

==== Springhead to Aire junction ====
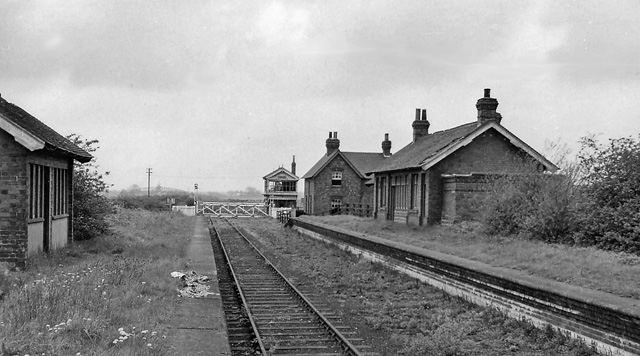
Remains in 1961 of Barmby station

Beyond Springhead the line continued on embanked track towards Willerby and Kirk Ella station, then crossing the small shallow valley at Eppleworth in the foothills of the Yorkshire Wolds by a brick viaduct (locally known as "five arches"). From here the line rose to Little Weighton station via a 83 ft (25 m) deep cutting. Then the line reached a high point of 262 ft (80 m) after inclines of up to 1 in 100 before entering the 2,116-yard (1,935 m) Drewton Tunnel after which the descent grade was 1 in 150 for seven miles (eleven kilometres), passing through Sugar Loaf Tunnel and Weedley Tunnel further west, both shorter tunnels of 132 yards (121 m), and then South Cave and North Cave stations.

Beyond North Cave the land is flat, and the line turned steadily south-west aiming for Barnsley, passing through Newport, Sandholme, and Eastrington, before passing over the NER's Hull to Selby Line followed by Howden and Barmby stations. The next major obstacle of the River Ouse was crossed by a swing bridge at Long Drax. The minor station of Drax preceded a crossing under the NER's Selby to Goole Line after which was Carlton station and then the first of the junctions with other railways through which the Hull and Barnsley obtained much of its traffic.

==== South of Aire junction ====
Almost immediately after a bridge crossing over the River Aire, a branch heading north–south joined the line at Aire junction; this was jointly operated by the H&BR and Great Central Railway which opened in 1916 and was known as the Hull and Barnsley and Great Central Joint Line.

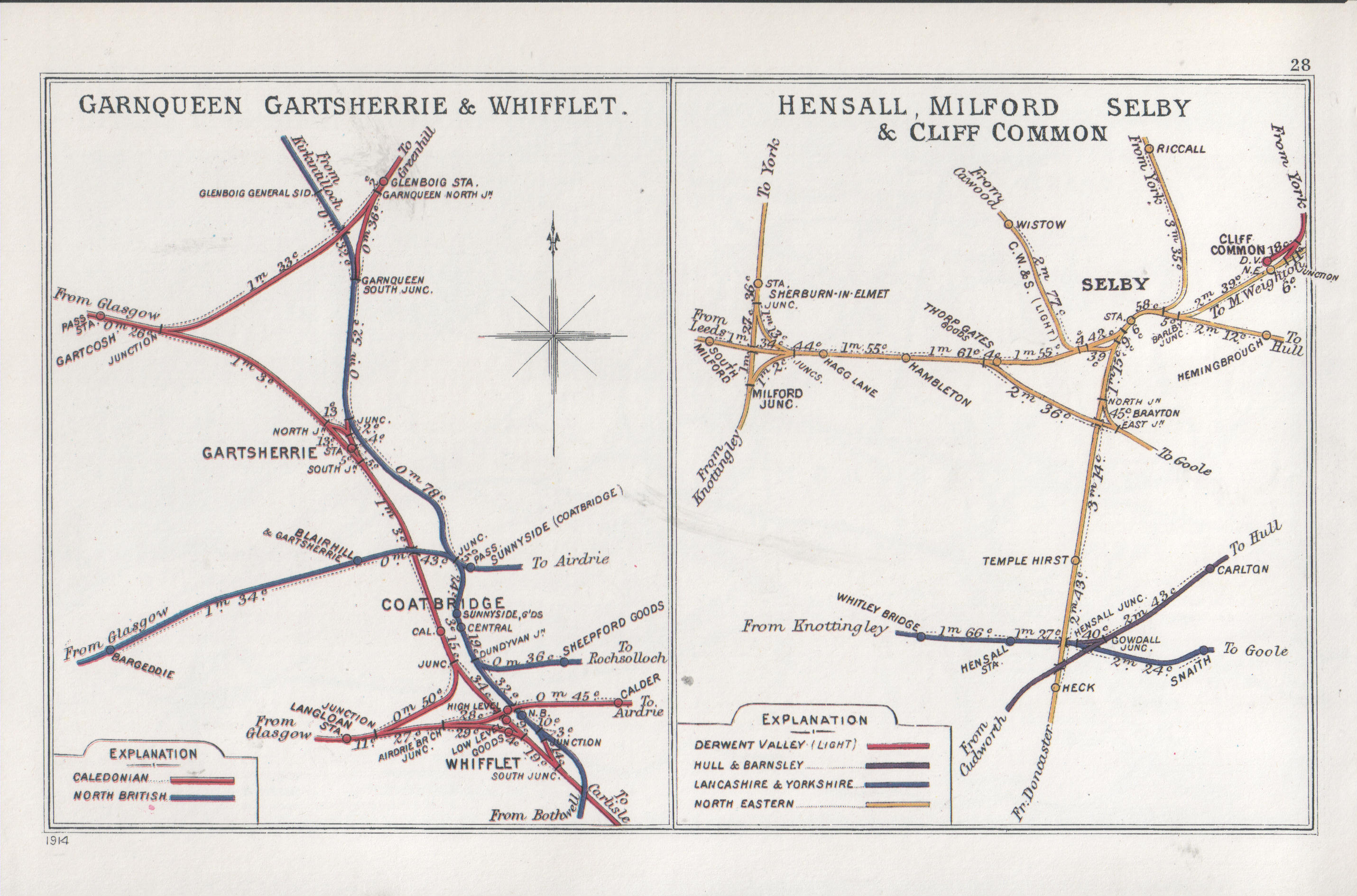
1914 Railway map showing the lines crossing of the NER main line just after Gowdall junction

Less than one mile (1.6 kilometres) south-west of Aire junction a westward junction (Gowdall junction) connected the H&BR to the Lancashire and Yorkshire Railway (L&YR) at Hensall junction via a short chord. The main line continued south-west and crossed over the same L&Y line (the Wakefield, Pontefract and Goole Railway then owned by the L&YR). About one mile (1.6 km) further on the line crossed over the NER main line to Selby (the former East Coast Main Line via Shaftholme and Selby. The line then crossed the Knottingley and Goole Canal, then went over another L&YR line (connecting Knottingley to Shaftholme junction) before arriving in Kirk Smeaton station.

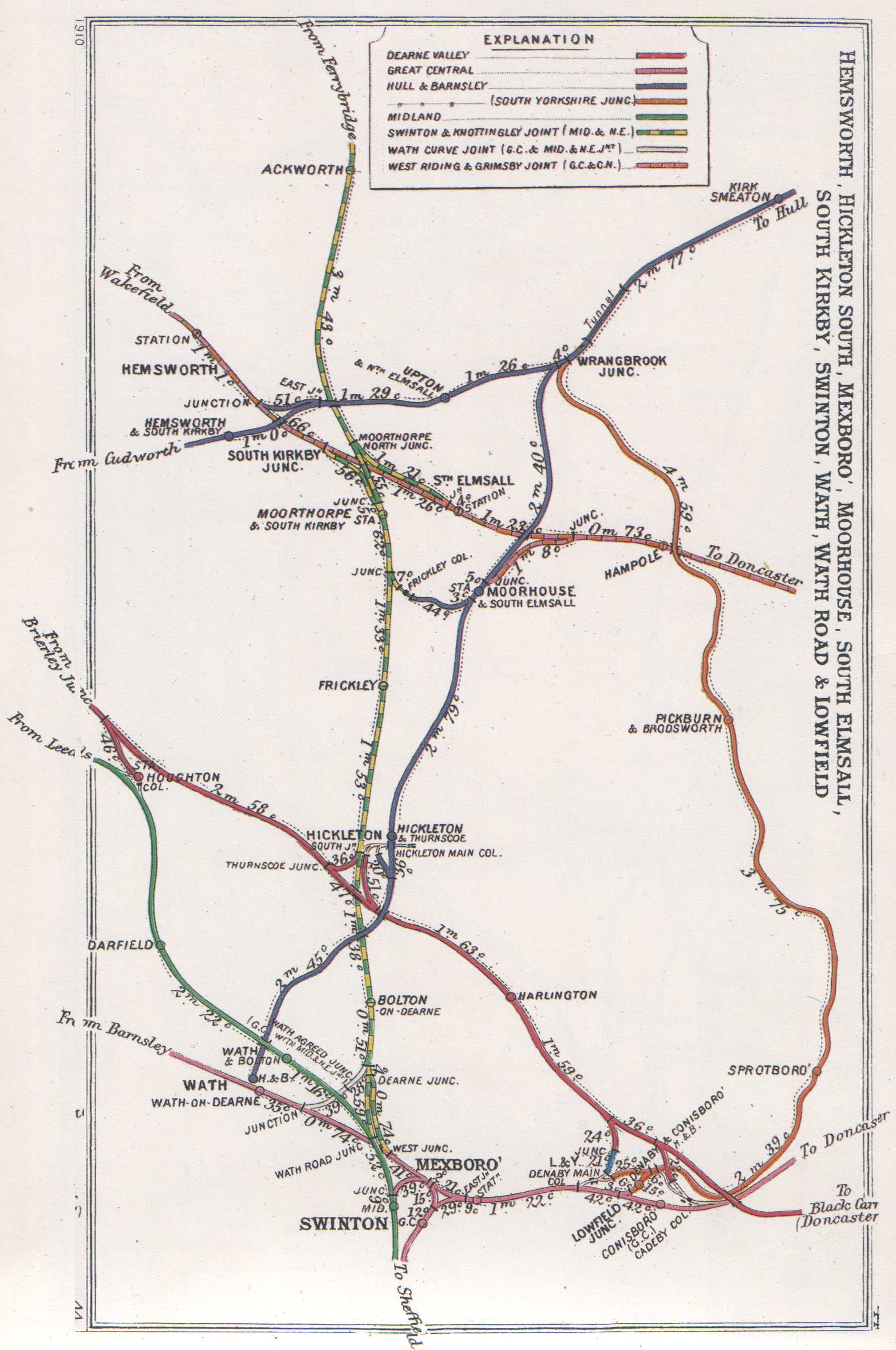
1910 railway map showing the line south of Kirk Smeaton including Wrangbrook junction and the Wath branch

After Kirk Smeaton the terrain becomes hilly again, but with Magnesian Limestone replacing the softer chalk found in the Wolds; after a cutting the line entered the 1,226-yard (1,121 m) South Kirkby Tunnel (commonly known as the Barnsdale Tunnel) before reaching Wrangbrook Junction. Here the South Yorkshire Junction Railway (opened 1894) branched south and then south-east ultimately for Denaby, whilst the Hull and South Yorkshire Extension Railway (opened 1902) branched soon after travelling roughly south towards Wath, whilst the line heading for Barnsley continued roughly west-south-west.

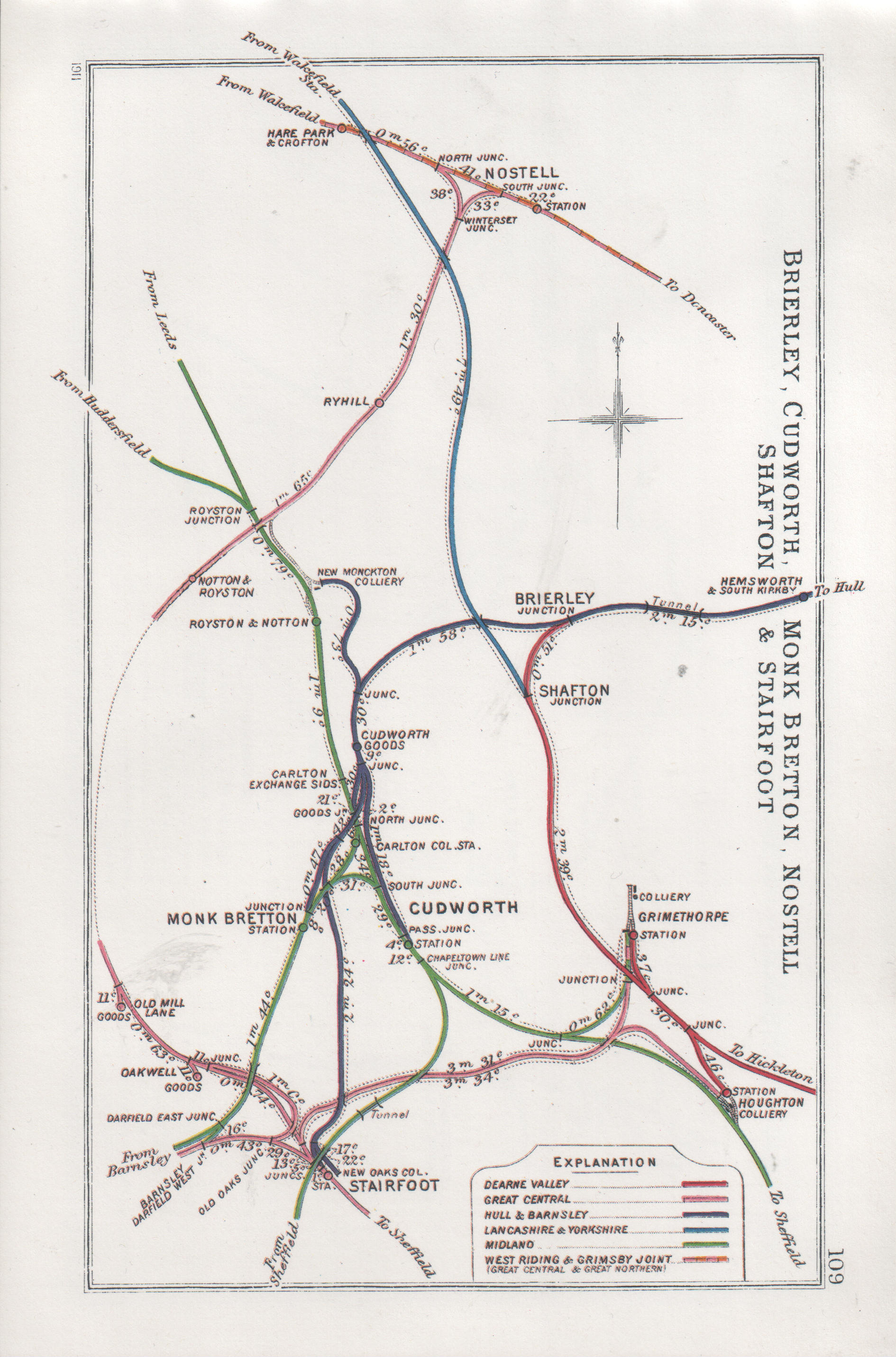
1911 Railway map showing south-western portion of the line from Hemsworth to Cudworth and Stairfoot

After Upton the line crossed over the Swinton and Knottingley joint line (Midland and North Eastern railways), shortly after a branch west from Hemsworth East junction connected the line to the West Riding and Grimsby joint line which was operated by the Manchester, Sheffield and Lincolnshire (after 1897 the Great Central) and Great Northern railways; which was then passed over by the continuation of the H&BR main line. The next station was Hemsworth.

The final tunnel on the line was Brierley Tunnel which is 685 yards (626 m) long. The line then passed westward through Brierley junction where a southward-turning chord connected with the Dearne Valley Railway on which the H&BR had running powers. A northward continuation of the Dearne Valley Railway was then passed under.

Finally Cudworth was reached: first was Cudworth Goods station; then Cudworth North junction, where the line split into two main branches; a third branch west joined the Midland Railway via goods exchange sidings. The westernmost of the two main branches crossed the Midland Line by girder truss bridge, then a spur to Monk Bretton station left west, whilst the final part of the line continued to Stairfoot junction where it joined the Great Central Main Line. The easterly branch ran to Cudworth station where there was a platform, but no connection.

The line's second locomotive depot was found at Cudworth, as well as marshalling yards. The whole main line as built was double tracked.

=== Operation and events (1885–1922) ===
The HB&WRJR&DCo. began business with large amounts of debt, and within a year of its opening a price war had begun between the Hull Dock Company and the Hull and Barnsley on dock charges, and between the Hull and Barnsley and the NER on transit charges. Neither of the two Hull-based companies could expect to win against the much larger North Eastern Railway. By 1887 the HB&WRJR&DCo. was seeking a way out of debt and approached the Midland Railway for a possible merger. Reasonable terms were made, but the proposal was rejected by the shareholders of the Hull company. An amalgamation by the NER itself was then proposed, which would have included the NER paying off the HB&WRJR&DCo.'s debts; this scheme too was rejected.

The Hull and Barnsley, unable to pay its debts, went into receivership for two years until 1889. The Hull Dock Company amalgamated with the NER in the early 1893 – requiring another act of Parliament, the North Eastern Railway (Hull Docks) Act 1893 (56 & 57 Vict. c. cxcviii) – one condition of which was that in the event of the NER building another dock in Hull (which had already been planned in 1891 as part of an unsuccessful merger attempt between the HB&WRJ and the NER) the Hull and Barnsley should give its consent, and be able to make the new dock a joint operation between the two railway companies. Additionally an agreement was reached that there would be no reduction in dock duties without prior agreement or discussion.

In 1894 the South Yorkshire Junction Railway opened. Though independent, it was worked by Hull and Barnsley engines, and connected the company to more collieries.

In the following years of the 1890s various proposals, including another to merge the NER and HB&WRJR&DCo., and others for expansion of the Hull docks came, but were blocked by one party's interests or another's. Finally in 1899 both railway companies had agreed to the construction of a new dock, to the east of Alexandra Dock, access to which was from the HB&WRJ's elevated line via an extension from Alexandra Dock, and from a joint line branching off the H&BR at Bridges Junction.

In 1902 an extension from Wrangbrook junction opened, connecting to Wath and further collieries. From 1905 cooperation with the Midland allowed trains to run all the way to Sheffield via Cudworth; the same year Edward Watkin, nephew of Sir Edward Watkin, became general manager of the company. For these express trains bogie coaches were purchased and M. Stirling's 4-4-0 tender locomotives used. From 1907 at Sandholme there were marshalling yards and a turntable, enabling freight trains to be split in two for the steep section towards Hull into the Wolds hills.

Hull and Barnsley Railway Act 1905
- Act of Parliament
- Parliament of the United Kingdom
- Long title: An Act to extend the time for the purchase of lands and completion of works authorised by the Hull Barnsley and West Riding Junction Railway and Dock (South Yorkshire Extension Lines) Act 1902 to amend the Acts relating to the Hull Barnsley and West Riding Junction Railway and Dock Company and for other purposes.
- Citation: 5 Edw. 7. c. xli

Dates
- Royal assent: 30 June 1905

Text of statute as originally enacted

After exiting receivership, the fortunes of the Hull and Barnsley recovered and it began to pay reasonable dividends on ordinary stock. In 1905 the Hull Barnsley and West Riding Junction Railway and Dock Company officially changed its name by the Hull and Barnsley Railway Act 1905 (5 Edw. 7. c. xli) to the shorter Hull and Barnsley Railway. The same year running powers were obtained and a junction made with the Dearne Valley Railway. Also in that year the National Radiator Company opened in Hull. The site was served by a siding from Ella Street on the H&BR line, as well as being accessed by a siding from the NER on the Hull to Bridlington line, forming a non-official line link between the networks of H&BR and NER.

Construction of the new dock – "King George V Dock" – was completed by 1914.

In 1916 the Hull and Barnsley and Great Central Joint Railway opened, adding to the number of collieries from which the company could transport coal.

==== Engine sheds ====
The following engine sheds were operated by the H&BR:

- Cudworth
- Hensall
- Springhead engine shed, Hull
- Alexandra Dock engine shed (Hull)
- Bullcroft
- Denaby
- Millhouses
- Doncaster York Road
- Wrangbrook

=== Accidents and incidents ===
- On 23 December 1903, a passenger train collided with wagons on the line at Springhead Junction, Hull. Locomotive No.34 with a train of 5 four wheel carriages and a fish van ran into the back of a formation of a brake van and 11 loaded mineral wagons which had detached unnoticed from an earlier train due to a broken coupling. The driver was seriously injured, passengers reported only minor injuries.
- At around midnight 25 September 1907 the boiler of F2 locomotive No. 109 exploded. The train was halted whilst the fireman was collecting a signal token before Wrangbrook Junction near Wath when the boiler exploded. The driver, John Edward Brook, was blown 400 yards (370 metres) by the blast and was badly scalded and injured; he was taken to Beckett Hospital in Barnsley but died four days later. An inquest was held, where a boiler specialist reported that 30 7/8 in (22 mm) stays had given way – the stays had been over repaired without replacement; it was noted that suspect stays had been reported in March, and that a boilersmith had previously warned the stays required replacement. A verdict of accidental death was returned, on the basis of an error of judgement having been made.

=== Rolling stock and vessels ===
==== Locomotives ====
The H&BR never manufactured any of its own locomotives, all being built elsewhere. The first types in use were to the design of W. Kirtley (Locomotive Superintendent of the London, Chatham and Dover Railway) who was acting as a consultant. Matthew Stirling (son of Patrick Stirling of 'Stirling Single' fame) was the first and only Locomotive Superintendent of the H&BR during its independence, and who undertook the rebuilding of some of Mr. Kirtley's designs, as well as contracting the construction of his own designs to various builders. His locomotives were typically domeless, and many of the original Kirtley engines were also rebuilt without domes.

Kirtley's locomotives were painted black with grey lining. Matthew Stirling subtly modified the livery – using invisible green (black except in bright sunlight) produced from a 50:50 mixture of 'drop black' and 'brunswick green'. Lining was of broad stripes of blue (ultramarine) with red (vermilion) edges. The 2-4-0 and 0-6-0 tender locomotives procured by Kirtley carried a small cursive monogram of the letters "HB&WRJR", other locomotives carried the initials "H&BR".

A total of 186 engines were operated by the Hull and Barnsley Railway, on merging into the NER the locomotives were briefly renumbered by adding 3000 to the original number. Following the incorporation into the LNER soon after the surviving locomotives were assigned numbers between 2405 and 2542, in no specific order. Most except the H&BR Class F3 (LNER Class N13) were withdrawn between 1930 and 1940, the B Class beginning withdrawal earlier in 1925. The last F3 was withdrawn in 1956.

==== Rolling stock ====
Initially the railway used 30 ft (9.1 m) 2-axle coaches, by the time services to Sheffield were introduced the company had 4-axle 51 ft (16 m) composite corridor coaches on bogies. Most of the rolling stock was for freight; in 1923 the company had 4,808 freight wagons of which over 3,000 were open wagons. Additionally the company possessed a snow plough, since the cuttings in the Yorkshire Wolds were prone to drifts when snow occurred.

==== Ships and watercraft ====
The company operated a number of vessels in relation to the construction, operation and maintenance of the Alexandra Dock; those vessels included:

- Alexandra – tug built by Earle's shipbuilding of Hull in 1885.
- Barnsley – tug – a sister of "Alexandra" built in 1886 but not by the same builder.
- Hull – tug built by J. P. Rennoldson of South Shields in 1898.
- "H.& B.R. No. 1", "H.& B.R. No. 2" and "H.& B.R. No. 3" – static dumb dredgers.
- "H.& B.R. No. 4" – built by Jonkeers of Kinderdijk in 1914; grab dredger engined by Earle's of Hull. Transferred to N.E.R in 1922 and renamed "N.E.R Grab No. 4" and to the L.N.E.R. in 1923. Renamed "H. & B.R. Dredger No. 4" in 1938 and ownership changed again in 1948 to the Docks and Inland Waterways Executive and then to B.T. Docks Board. Eventually sold to Italian interests and broken up in 1963.

== History 1922–present ==
=== As part of the NER (1922–1923) ===
The Railways Act 1921 ended the company's independence; from 1 April 1922 the Hull and Barnsley Railway became part of the NER. The locomotive works at Springhead was downgraded – the extent of locomotive maintenance was reduced and the carriage works closed, skilled workers and machinery were relocated to Darlington. (Note: The closure was discussed in Parliament – with respect to the loss of skilled jobs in the Hull area.) At this time 43 old engines were decommissioned. Edward Watkin (General Manager) and Matthew Stirling also departed. Due to duplication a number of stations were renamed. (Note: Newport renamed as Wallingfen, Eastrington renamed as North Eastrington, Howden renamed as South Howden, Drax renamed as Drax Abbey, and Carlton became Carlton Towers.)

Incorporation into the NER was just part of a larger scale of consolidation throughout the British railway system, and on 1 January 1923 the NER along with the Hull and Barnsley Line became part of the London and North Eastern Railway (LNER).

=== As part of the LNER (1923–1948) ===
Cannon Street station in Hull ceased to be used a passenger station in 1924, this coincided with the construction of a chord to the NER line just north-west of Walton Street level crossing to the elevated line. (Note: The chord allowed through running between the H&BR outside Hull and Paragon station)

Mainline freight work commonly used the ex Great Central Robinson 2-8-0 locomotives (later classified as LNER Class O4). The NER Class P1 0-6-0, NER Class Y 4-6-2T, NER Class T and NER Class T2 0-8-0 locomotives inherited from the NER also replaced Hull and Barnsley types on other freight work.

In 1929 a halt west of Springhead works and sidings was constructed, (Note: The station was added as part of the 'Hull and district interval service' – a regular service started in April 1929 in the Hull and surrounding area intended to halt a decline in passenger numbers.) The station was unstaffed, and possibly the smallest in Britain, with two wooden platforms one coach in length each (25 ft). The same month the Springhead Halt opened passenger services between Wath and Kirk Smeaton ended. Many similar basic stations were built on the early railways for the convenience of staff and passengers. On the Stainland Line from Halifax a small halt was made at the north end of West Vale viaduct to save passengers from having to walk about 3/4 mile (1.2 km) from the station at West Vale high on the hill above the viaduct.

Passenger services between South Howden and Cudworth ceased in 1932.

=== As part of British Railways (1948–1994) ===
Mainline freight continued to be worked by 2-8-0 locomotives, with WD Austerity 2-8-0 being ubiquitous. 8F type 2-8-0 locomotives also became common on the southern sections of the line, after through working ended (1958). (A large number of the class were purchased by the LNER from the war department after the Second World War, and in 1948 by the British Transport Commission.)

In 1951 a single sided station halt (Boothferry Park Halt railway station) was built on the branch in Hull between Springhead south junction and Neptune Street to serve the Hull City Football club (directly situated next to the line), the service ended in 1986. (Note: In 2002 Hull City moved to a new stadium rendering the halt obsolete, the old stadium "Boothferry Park" was demolished between 2008 and 2010.)

The locomotive shed at Cudworth closed in 1951.

Passenger services between Hull and South Howden ended in 1955. Through freight on the same line ended in 1958, with complete closure between Little Weighton and Wrangbrook junction in 1959. Freight working on remaining sections west of Hull (Springhead) closed completely in the next decade; the section between Moorhouse and Wrangbrook: 1963, between Little Weighton and Springhead : 1964, between Wrangbrook and both Monckton as well as Sprotborough in 1967, Cudworth to Monckton in 1968.

In Hull the bridge over the NER main line at Hessle Road was removed in 1962 and the elevated H&BR dock branch section became connected to the Hull to Selby Line at Hessle Road junction as part of a scheme to reduce the number of level crossings in Hull by routing all rail traffic to east Hull via the elevated Hull and Barnsley Line.

All traffic from Cudworth to Wrangbrook junction ended in 1967. The branch to Cannon Street closed completely in 1968. By 1970 the only parts of the line still with traffic were the Hull elevated section, and a few short sections with industrial uses. Alexandra Dock closed in the 1980s and the rail connection was removed, subsequently the dock re-opened but without a rail connection.

Part of the elevated line to King George Dock was converted to a single line in 1988 and one train working introduced, four years later increased amounts of imports; specifically coal; meant that staffed (tokenised) working was reintroduced in 1992.

Part of the path of the line between Hensall and Drax was opened for Merry Go Round trains to Drax Power Station in 1972, the Long Drax swing bridge on the Ouse to the north-east offered a link for future developments and was maintained until 1968, but was dismantled in 1976.

=== Post privatisation (1994–) ===
==== Hull Docks Branch ====
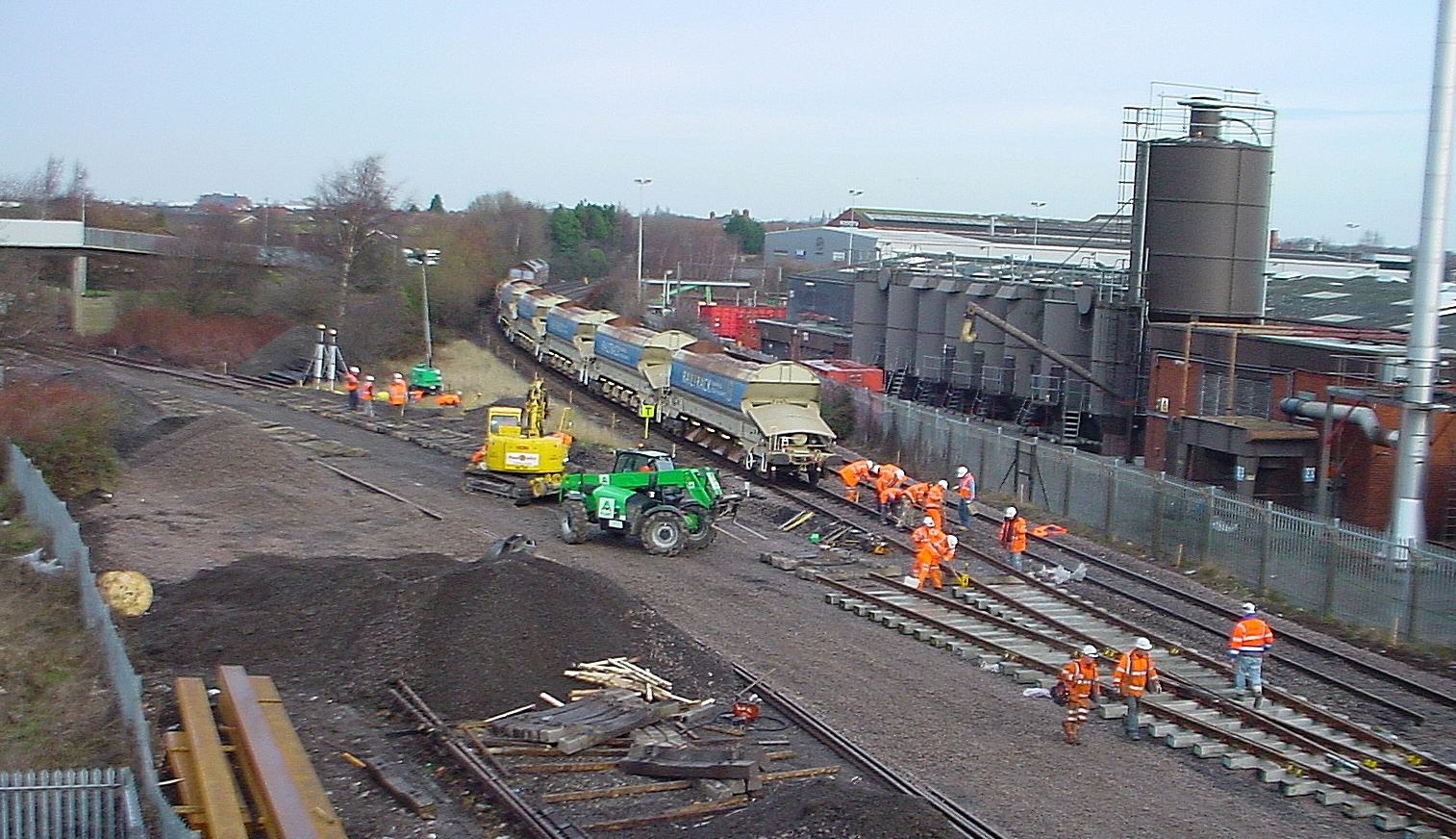
Hessle Road Junction relaying Christmas 2007

In 2007 over £10 million was allocated to a project to increase capacity on the former Hull and Barnsley Railway branch to the Hull docks. Network Rail, Associated British Ports, Yorkshire Forward, Hull City Council and The Northern Way were involved in funding or supporting the scheme. (Note: The funding for the project (as of 2008/9) was : Yorkshire Forward: £4.75 million, Northern Way: £4.75 million, Associated British Ports: £2.6 million, Network Rail, £5.1 million.) The work was to include partial re-doubling of the line, remedial and replacement work on the numerous bridges, and signalling upgrades, and to increase the line speed to 30 mph (48 km/h) except at Hull Bridge. The capacity of the line was to be increased from 10 to 22 trains in each direction.

In late 2007 the Network Rail gave the contract to GrantRail (now VolkerRail). Work carried out included the re-instatement of a double track junction at Hessle Road (the junction with the main line, previously singled in 1984), restoration of double track from New Bridge Road to King George Dock, and removal of Ella Street bridge along with strengthening of 15 others. The upgraded line was formally opened in June 2008 by the transport minister Rosie Winterton. Work continued on the line after the official opening; the upgraded signalling system began use in September 2008.

Work on the ABP owned portion of the track was carried out by Trackwork Ltd. of Doncaster, at a cost of over £2.5 million.

In 2013 two bridges were replaced on the docks branch: a minor bridge, over James Reckitt Avenue, replaced at a cost of about £1 million, and a major bridge replacement, over Spring Bank West, costing £3.2 million.

In July 2014 an attempt to solve a pigeon roosting problem under the Chanterlands Avenue railway bridge led to "hundreds of inch long maggots" from the carcasses of dead birds falling off the bridge onto a footpath, described by one passer-by as "like something out of a horror film".

The line in the 21st century
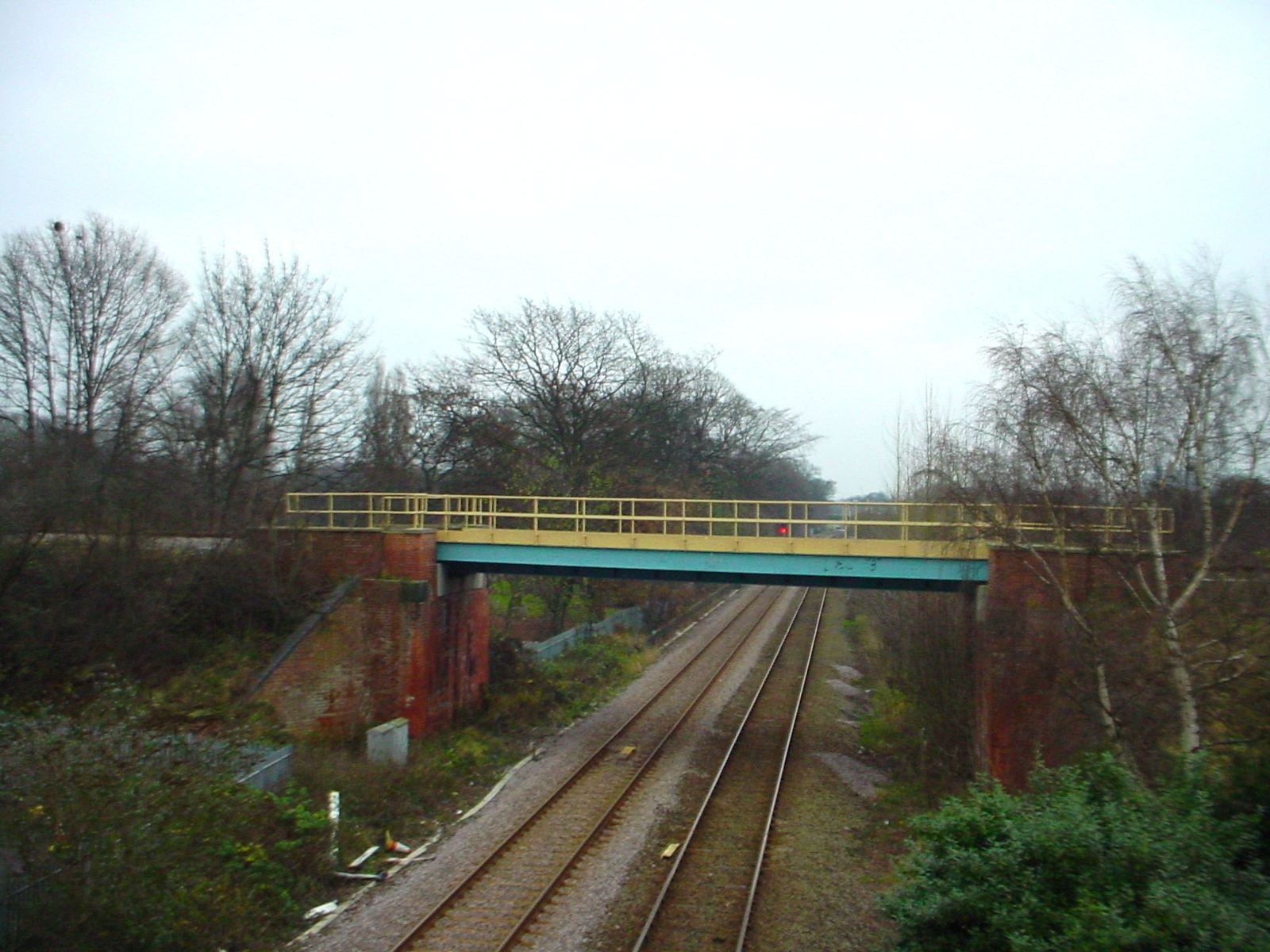
Bridge on the Hull Docks branch over the Hull to Scarborough Line

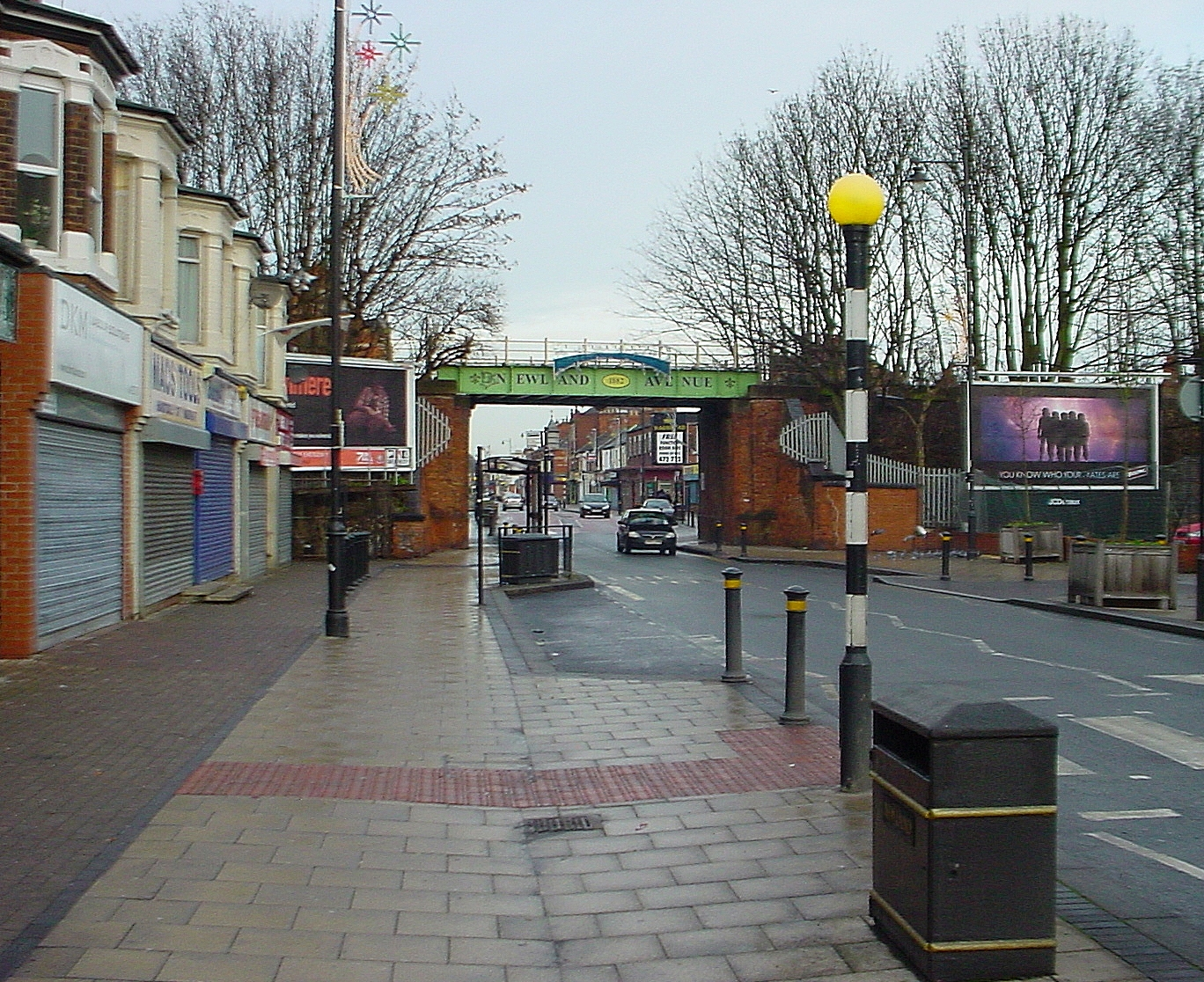
Bridge over Newland Avenue, Hull

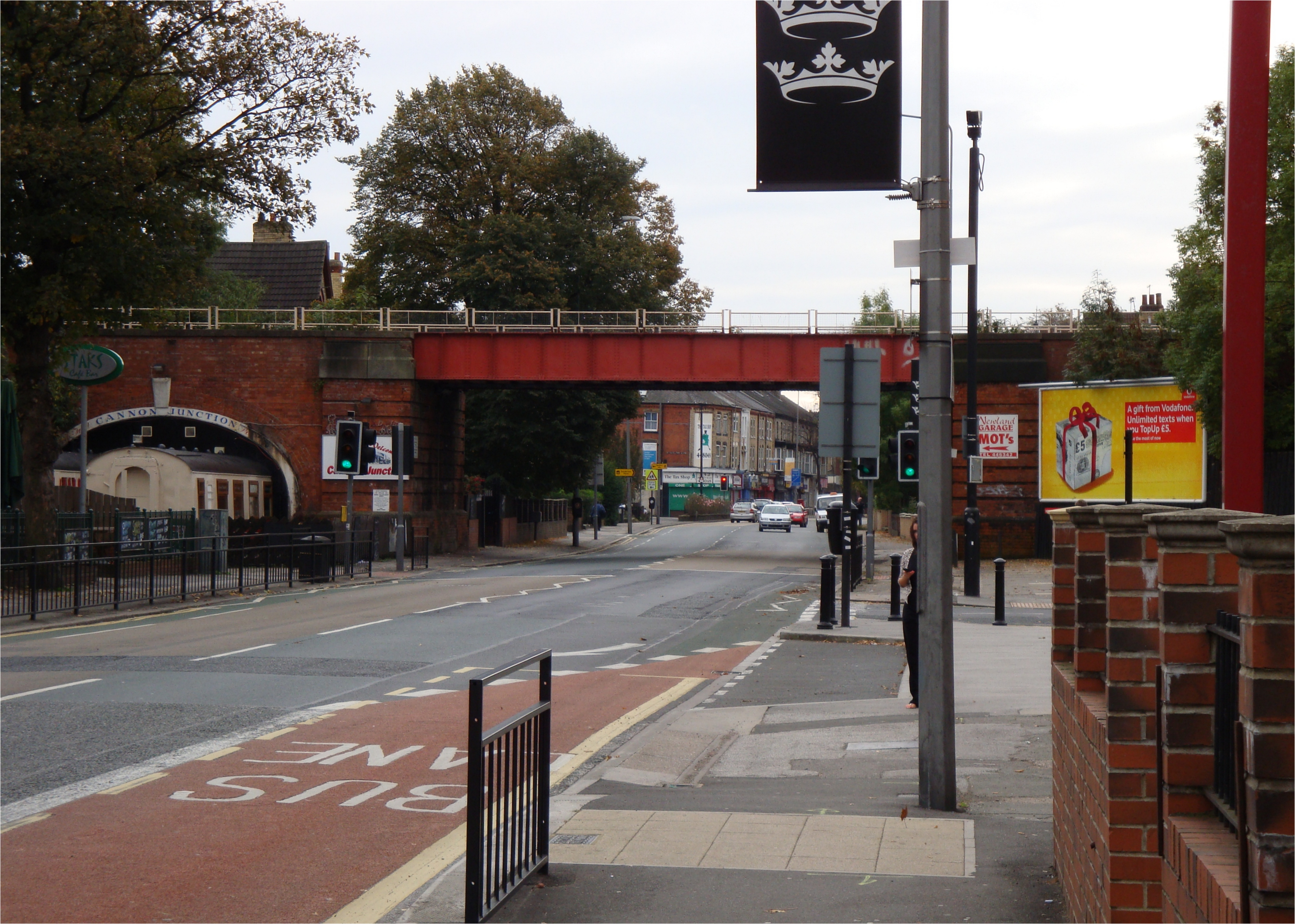
Beverley Road Bridge, Hull

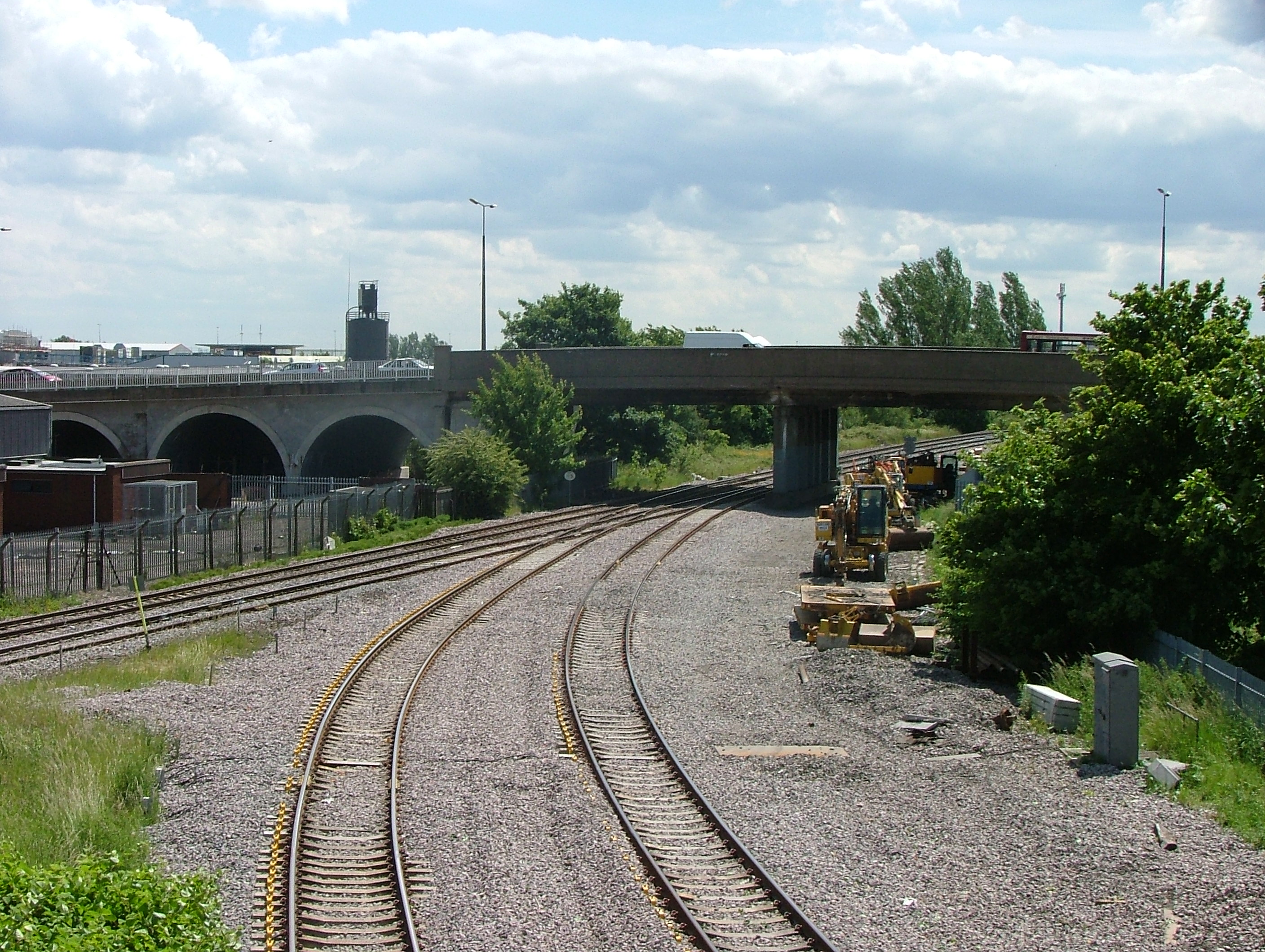
Completed double junction at Hessle Road, Hull

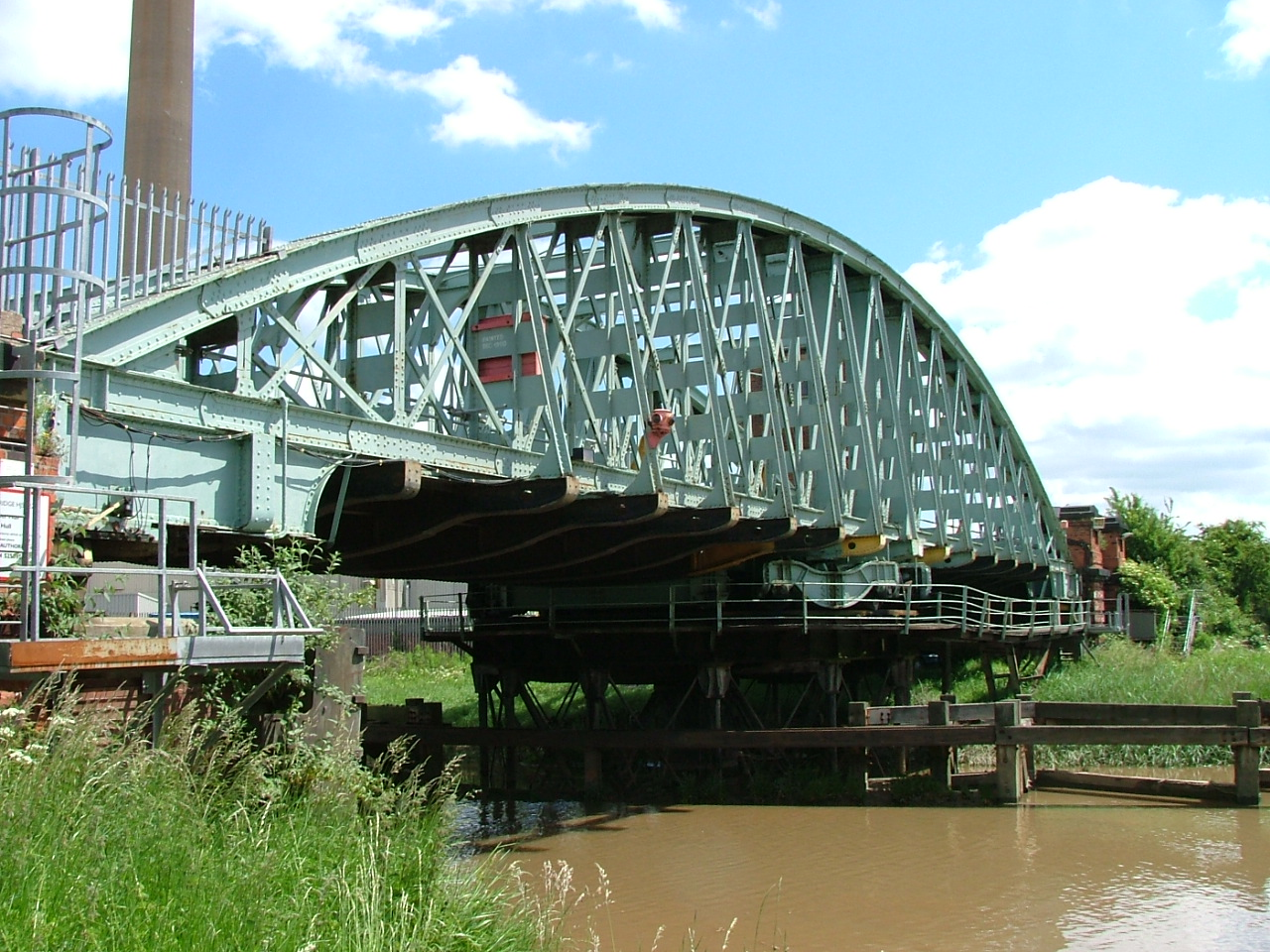
The Hull and Barnsley Railway swingbridge over the River Hull

== Use of closed parts of the line ==
Drapers Metal merchants used the Sculcoates, and later part of the former Neptune Street goods yards as part of their scrap metal business – during the 1960s many steam locomotives were dismantled there. (Note: As many as 730 were scrapped by Drapers, one a Black 5 was later preserved.)

The cutting at Little Weighton, and nearby chalk quarries were used after closure (from 1969) as a landfill facility; filling of the quarries and cutting was approaching completion by 2008. After 2008 a site on the cutting near Willerby has been used as a recycling facility.

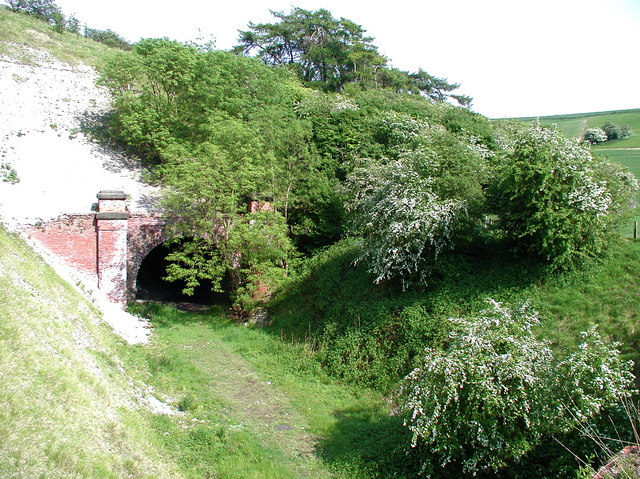
The line at Weedley Tunnel in 2008; the line in the Yorkshire Wolds was a scenic section of the line, and featured in the railway's promotional material for passenger traffic

In rural areas the embankments and earthworks remain as boundaries between fields, the trackbed west of Weedley Tunnel forms part of the Yorkshire Wolds Way and High Hunsley Circuit walks, and a section of the embankment between Kirk Ella and Hull also carries a footpath whilst a section further west is covered by the B1232 road. A section over two miles (three kilometres) long north of Newport is now part of the eastern end of M62 motorway. A number of the stations have been converted into private residences.

The areas of disused land west and east of Calvert Lane in Hull (formerly Springhead works and sidings and the land between Springbank East, West and South junctions) have become a wildlife habitat, the area between the junctions being assessed as "ecologically outstanding" and are classed as Sites of nature conservance importance and is a candidate site for "Local Nature Reserve status". The disused railway bridge giving walkers access to the western site was removed in August 2009. The former sidings at Calvert Lane were developed into a small housing estate "The Sidings" in the 2010s.

== Preservation ==
The Hull & Barnsley Railway Stock Fund owns and restores the six of the eight surviving vehicles which once belonged to the H&BR. Three coaches, two wagons and a tool van are kept on the North Yorkshire Moors Railway. They also own a wagon at Streetlife Museum of Transport in Hull. Another wagon is owned by the Buckinghamshire Railway Centre. No locomotives have survived.

- Carriage No. 1 - North Yorkshire Moors Railway. Built in 1884.
- Carriage No. 40 - North Yorkshire Moors Railway. Built in 1907.
- Carriage No. 58 - North Yorkshire Moors Railway. Built in 1908.
- Wagon No. 577 - North Yorkshire Moors Railway. Built in 1885.
- Wagon No. 3697 - North Yorkshire Moors Railway. Built in 1905.
- Tool Van No. 901622 - North Yorkshire Moors Railway. Built in 1885.
- Wagon No. 6 - Buckinghamshire Railway Centre. Built in 1895.
- Wagon No. Unknown - Streetlife Museum of Transport.

It may be safely predicted that before long, and especially if business competition becomes keener, Hull will again realise that emancipation from railway thraldom is a necessity of her existence as a first-class trading port

— F.B. Grotrian, Closing sentence, A History of Hull Railways, 1879
