= Kirk Smeaton railway station =

Disused railway station in North Yorkshire, England

Kirk Smeaton
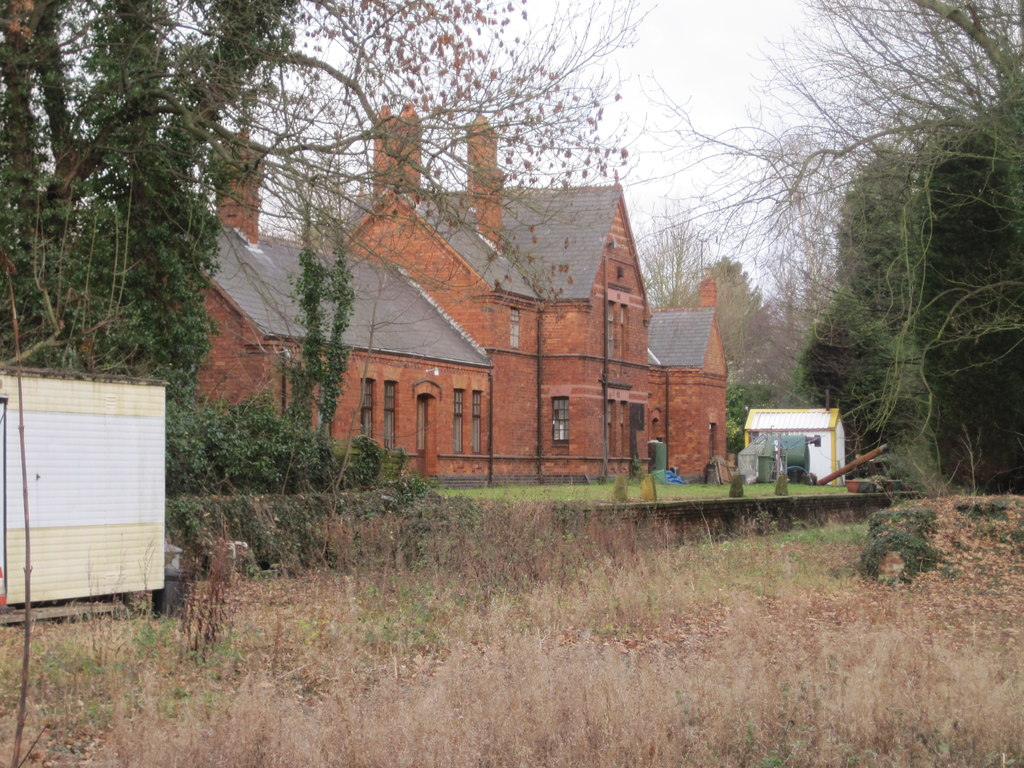
- The former station in 2012

General information
- Location: Little Smeaton, North Yorkshire, England
- Coordinates: 53.641432°N 1.198384°W
- Grid reference: SE531164

Other information
- Status: Disused

History
- Original company: Hull, Barnsley and West Riding Junction Railway
- Pre-grouping: Hull and Barnsley Railway
- Post-grouping: London and North Eastern Railway

Key dates
- 1885: Opened
- 1932: Closed for regular passenger service
- 1959: Closed completely
Location

Kirk Smeaton railway station is located on the east side of Willowbridge Road in Little Smeaton, North Yorkshire, England. It served the area between 1885 and 1932.

== History ==
It opened on 22 July 1885, two days after the Hull Barnsley and West Riding Junction Railway and Dock Company opened the line between Hull Cannon Street and Cudworth. The station had two facing platforms; the brick-built main station building in "domestic revival style" was on the down side, while the up platform had a waiting room. At the east end of the down platform was a signal box which controlled the goods yard. The latter consisted of four sidings, but had no goods shed.

A branch line between Wrangbrook Junction west of Kirk Smeaton and Denaby and Conisbrough opened in 1894, another between Wrangbrook Junction and Wath in 1904. Trains on these lines ran to and from Kirk Smeaton and beyond, also changing directions there, so that a locomotive turntable was installed in the station.

Passenger services between Kirk Smeaton, Denaby and Conisbrough were withdrawn on 1 February 1903, although miners' trains may have continued to run after this date. Passenger services to Wath ended on 8 April 1929. The station closed to passengers on 1 January 1932, when passenger services between South Howden and Cudworth ceased; it remained open for goods traffic until 6 April 1959. After closure to regular passenger services, some excursion trains still ran from the station to Hull Fair and to Elland Road, Leeds United's football ground, on 14 October 1933 during Hull Civic Week, and on 28 February 1953 to Leeds. At the time of its closure, the line and the station were operated by British Railways' North Eastern Region.

Preceding station	Historical railways	Following station
Upton and North Elmsall; Station and line closed	Hull, Barnsley and West Riding Junction Railway; Hull and Barnsley Railway	Carlton Towers; Station and line closed
Moorhouse and South Elmsall Halt; Station and line closed	Hull, Barnsley and West Riding Junction Railway; Hull and Barnsley Railway (Wath branch)	Terminus
Pickburn and Brodsworth; Station and line closed	Hull, Barnsley and West Riding Junction Railway; South Yorkshire Junction Railway (Denaby branch)	Terminus

== A brief history of the Hull and Barnsley Railway ==
The Hull, Barnsley and West Riding Junction Railway and Dock Company was formed, with the backing of Hull Corporation, to break the monopoly on dock and rail traffic from Hull; it included a deep water dock (Alexandra Dock) to the east of Hull. The railway never reached Barnsley itself, terminating at Cudworth (junction with the Midland Railway) some four miles short having been vigorously opposed by the North Eastern Railway.

It was one of the last new main lines to be built. The construction cost was double the estimates, due in part to difficulties in cutting and tunnelling through unexpectedly hard chalk in the Yorkshire Wolds near Little Weighton.

Although it was constructed primarily for goods traffic to and from the new dock and the South Yorkshire coalfields, fine villa-style passenger stations were provided, although passenger traffic was sparse.

In 1905, the company's name was shortened to the Hull and Barnsley Railway. It was absorbed into the NER on 1 April 1922.

The line was gradually run down from the early 1930s with all passenger services ceasing in 1955.

== The site today ==
The station building is now a private residence; part of the down platform is also preserved. The turntable pit has been partially filled in.

Only the high level goods line around Hull and a short section serving Drax power station remain in use.

The station was used in an episode of A Touch of Frost, "Held in Trust" from series ten.
