= Wrangbrook Junction =

Disused railway junction in West Yorkshire, England

Coordinates: 53.6148°N 1.2558°W

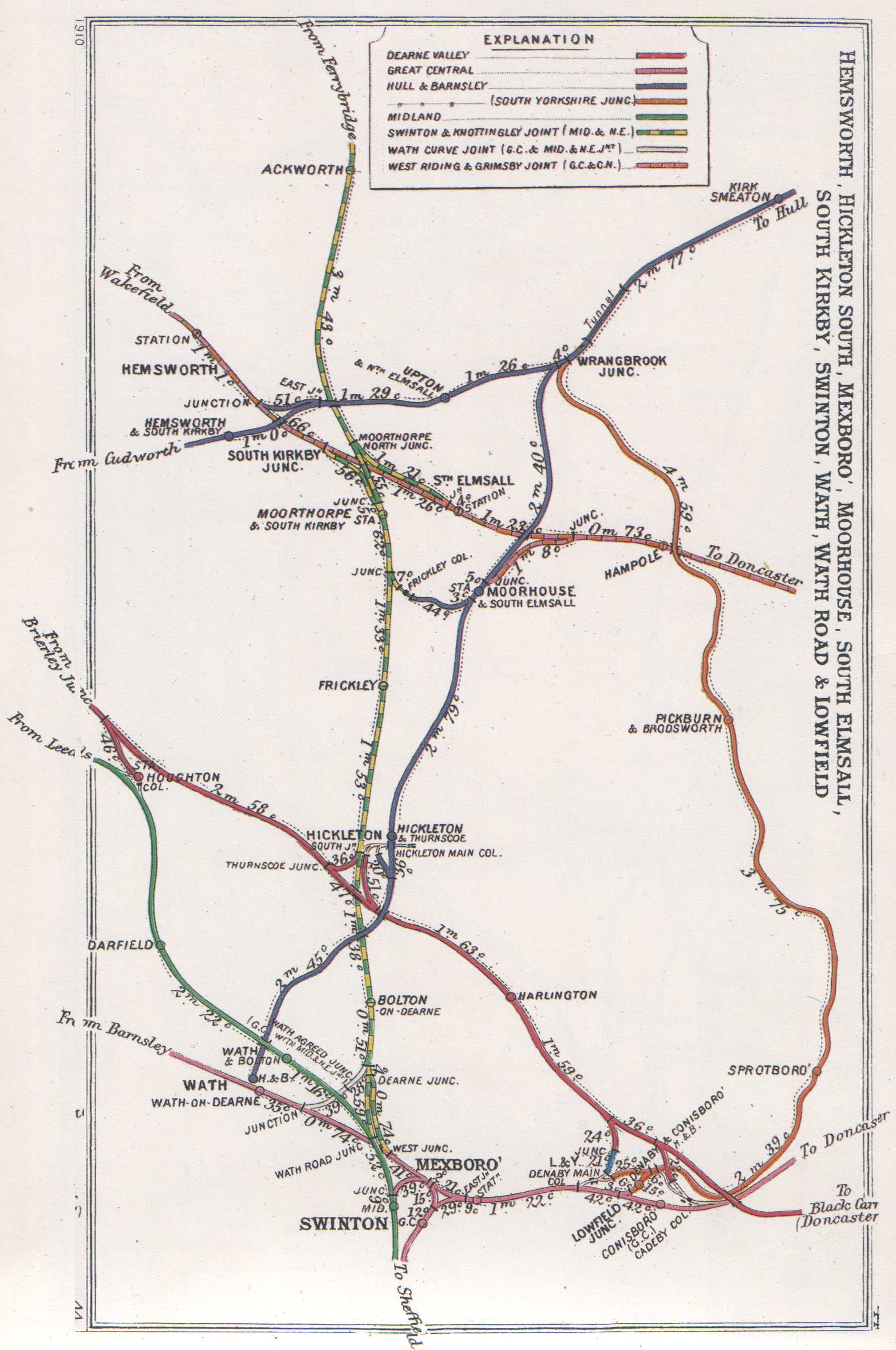
1910 railway map showing Wrangbrook Junction and the lines in the vicinity

Wrangbrook Junction near Upton in West Yorkshire was a location where two lines branched off the Hull and Barnsley Railway main line from Hull Cannon Street to Cudworth. The first junction led to Denaby and Conisbrough on the South Yorkshire Junction Railway, and after some four chains (80 m) further the Hull & South Yorkshire Extension Railway to Wath diverged. The line between Hull and Cudworth had opened on 20 July 1885, the branch to Denaby on 1 September 1894 and the one to Wath on 31 March 1902.

Originally three signal boxes controlled the junctions: "Wrangbrook North" on the south side of the main line by the Denaby branch; "Wrangbrook South" on the west side of the Denaby branch and "Wrangbrook West" on the west side of the Wath branch. In 1934 South and West boxes were closed and control passed to North box which was renamed "Wrangbrook Junction".

The line between Wrangbrook Junction and Little Weighton was closed on 6 April 1959. The section from Moorhouse to Wrangbrook Junction followed on 30 September 1963), and the lines between Wrangbrook Junction and Monckton and Sprotborough both closed on 7 August 1967.
