= Pickburn and Brodsworth railway station =

Disused railway station in South Yorkshire, England

Pickburn and Brodsworth
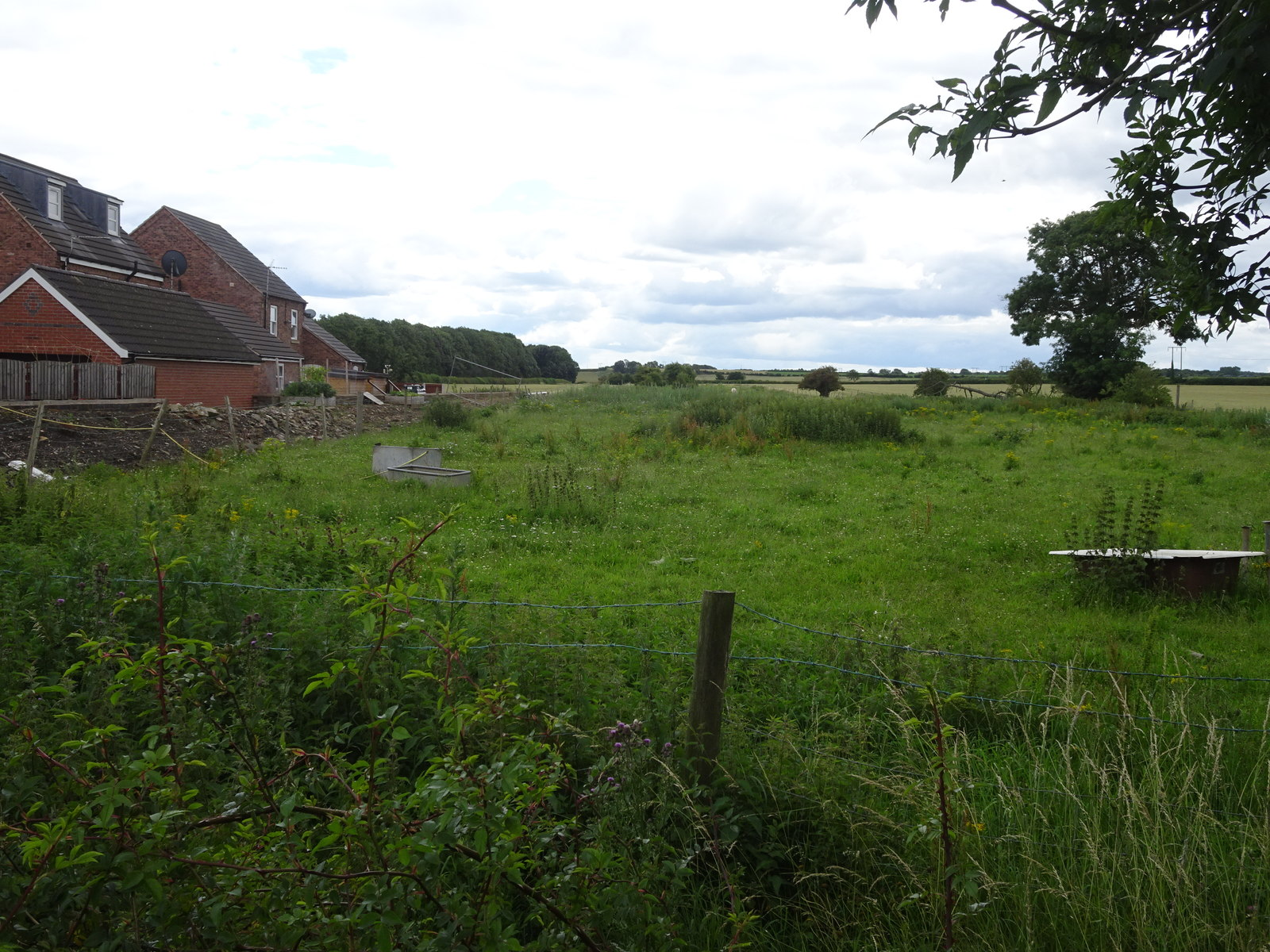
- Station site in July 2020.

General information
- Location: Pickburn, Doncaster; England
- Coordinates: 53.55977°N 1.21947°W
- Grid reference: SE518072

Other information
- Status: Disused

History
- Pre-grouping: South Yorkshire Junction Railway

Key dates
- 1 December 1894: opened
- 1 February 1903: closed
Location

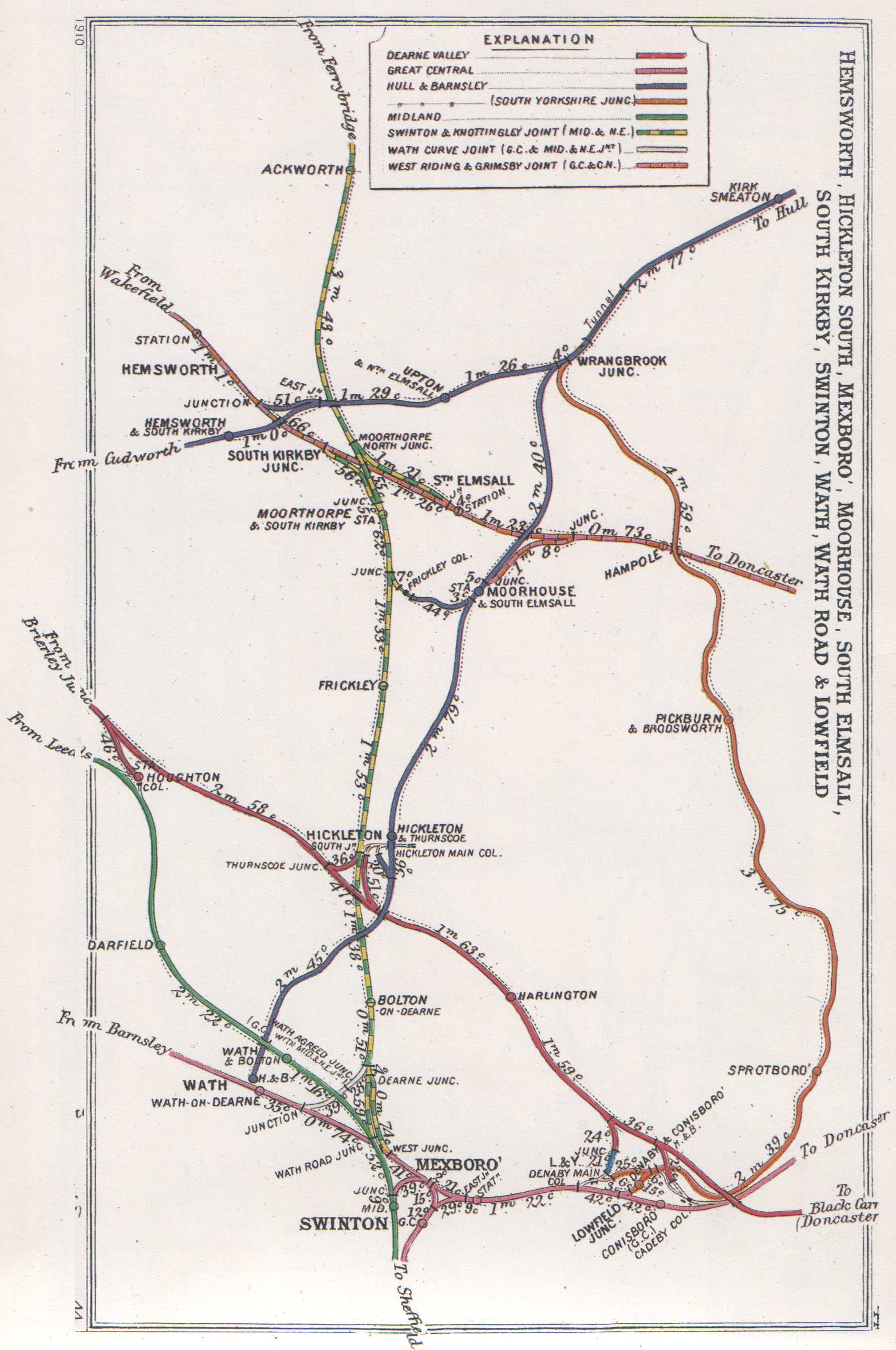
1910 Railway Clearing House diagram showing the route of the South Yorkshire Junction Railway, with Pickburn and Brodsworth station

Pickburn and Brodsworth railway station was a small railway station situated on the South Yorkshire Junction Railway's line between Wrangbrook Junction and Denaby and Conisbrough. It was situated 4 1/2 miles (7.2 km) south of Wrangbrook Junction, just inside what became the South Yorkshire boundary and was intended to serve the hamlet of Pickburn, which was close by, and Brodsworth, near Doncaster, South Yorkshire, a short distance away.

The station was similar to that at Sprotborough and controlled by a signal box which was replaced in 1910 when the opening of Brodsworth Colliery necessitated a larger installation. A short branch was built to access the colliery from this point.

Preceding station	Disused railways	Following station
Sprotborough	South Yorkshire Junction Railway; South Yorkshire Junction Railway	Kirk Smeaton
