= Moorhouse and South Elmsall Halt railway station =

Disused railway station in South Yorkshire, England

Moorhouse and South Elmsall Halt
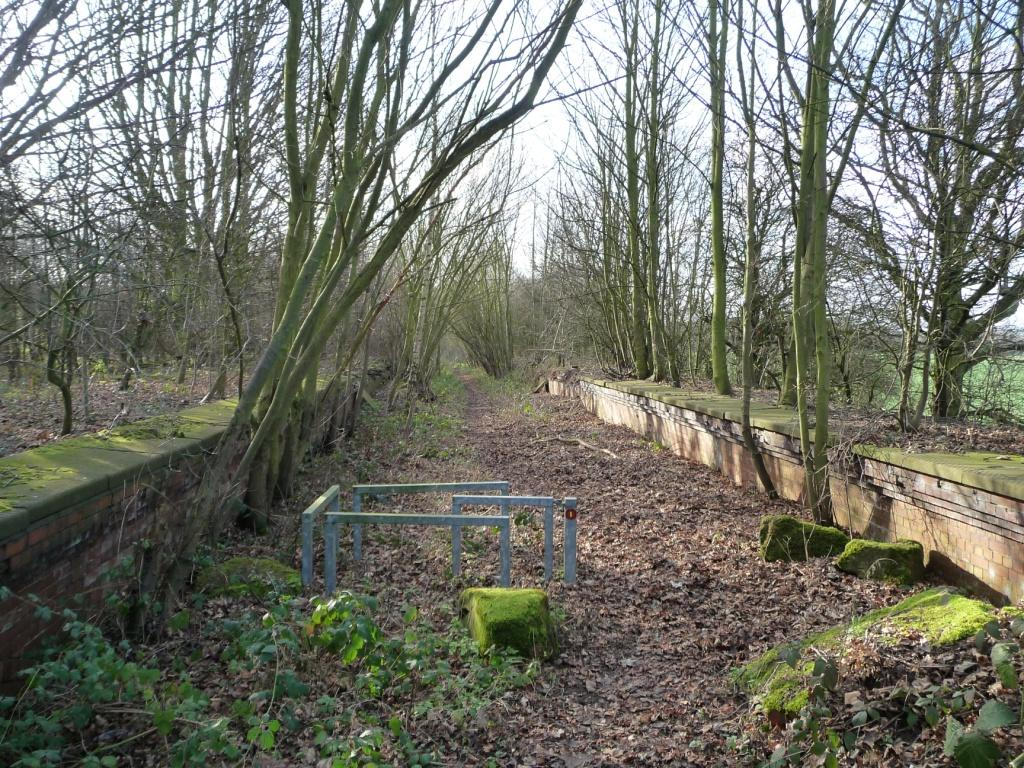
- Platforms of the former station

General information
- Location: Moorhouse, Doncaster; England
- Coordinates: 53.58225°N 1.27839°W
- Grid reference: SE478097
- Platforms: 2

Other information
- Status: Disused

History
- Original company: Hull and South Yorkshire Extension Railway
- Pre-grouping: Hull and Barnsley Railway
- Post-grouping: London and North Eastern Railway

Key dates
- 1902: opened
- 1929: closed
Location

Moorhouse and South Elmsall Halt was a railway station situated on the Hull and Barnsley Railway's branch line from Wrangbrook to Wath-upon-Dearne. The station served the village of Moorhouse and the town of South Elmsall on the South Yorkshire / West Yorkshire boundary, although this was about 1 mile (1.6 km) distant. The station is located between Hickleton and Thurnscoe and Wrangbrook Junction, where the Wath branch joined the main line. The single storey station building, on the Wath-bound platform was, unlike the others on the line, built of brick with a slate roof. The other platform had just a simple waiting room for the few passengers who used the station. The platform surfaces were gravel and stone edged. The station master's house, of a standard Hull and Barnsley style, was situated a road level by the underbridge.

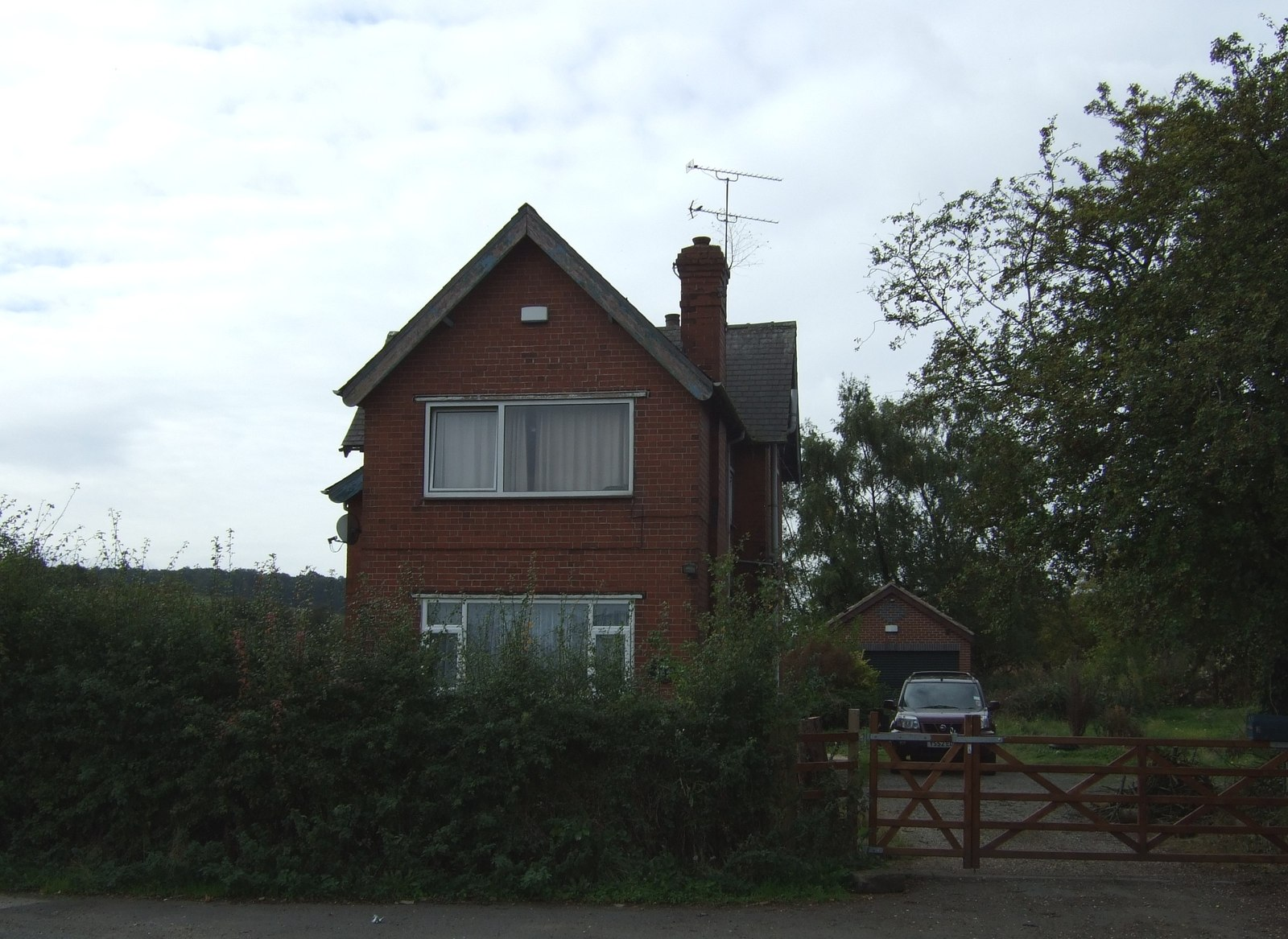
Former station master's house

Opening day was on 28 August 1902 and the station closed, along with the others on the line, on 6 April 1929.

To the north of the station a spur connecting this line to the West Riding and Grimsby Railway at Hampole diverged.

Preceding station	Disused railways	Following station
Kirk Smeaton	Hull and Barnsley and Great Central Joint Railway (Wath Branch)	Hickleton and Thurnscoe
