= Hull and South Yorkshire Extension Railway =

Disused railway in West Riding of Yorkshire, England

Hull and South Yorkshire Extension Railway Act 1897
- Act of Parliament
- Parliament of the United Kingdom
- Long title: An Act for incorporating the Hull and South Yorkshire Extension Railway Company and for other purposes.
- Citation: 60 & 61 Vict. c. ccxlv

Dates
- Royal assent: 6 August 1897

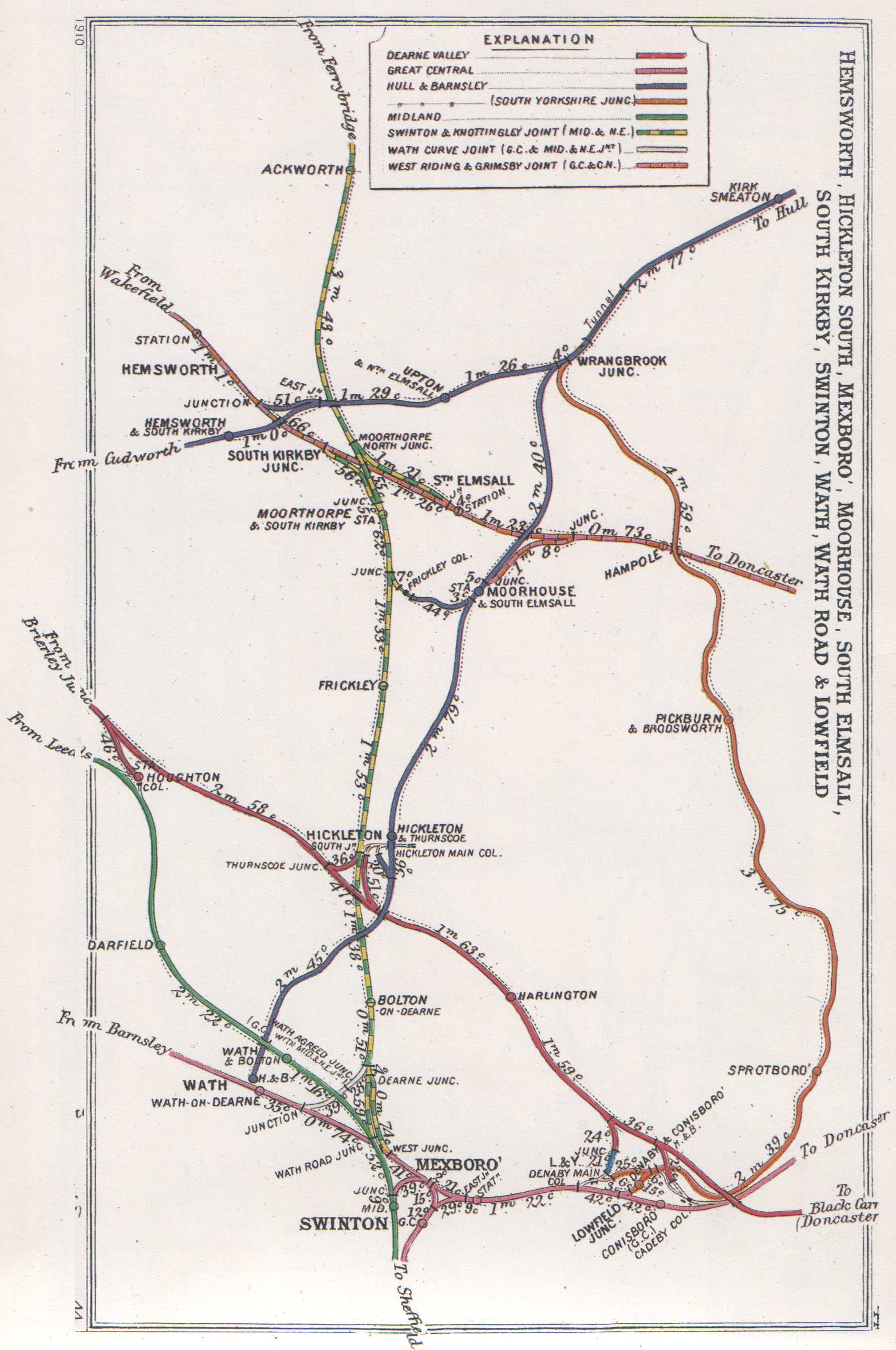
1910 Railway Clearing House diagram showing the route of the Hull & South Yorkshire Extension Railway (blue) branching from Wrangbrook Junction to Wath Upon Dearne.

The Hull and South Yorkshire Extension Railway was incorporated on 6 August 1897 by the Hull and South Yorkshire Extension Railway Act 1897 (60 & 61 Vict. c. ccxlv) and on 25 July 1898 was transferred to the Hull and Barnsley Railway. The bill was deposited by a group of local coal owners representing the Manvers Main Colliery Company, Hickleton Main Colliery, Wath Main Colliery, Wharncliffe Silkstone Colliery together with representatives of the Hull and Barnsley Railway.

== Description ==
The main line left that of the Hull and Barnsley (H&B) at Wrangbrook Junction, which then became a three-way affair with the South Yorkshire Junction Railway as well as the H&B. It ran via Hickleton and Thurnscoe to Wath where it made an east facing junction with the Manchester, Sheffield and Lincolnshire Railway and a spur to reach Manvers Main Colliery.

The line was over 8 miles (13 km) in length, with steep gradients - being between 1 in 120 to 150 uphill for the first six miles after Wrangbrook junction, then around 1 in 110 to 1 in 115 downhill to Wath-upon-Dearne. The line had problems with subsidence, as well as flooding at the point it passed under the Midland railway.

The line was transferred to the H&B on 25 July 1898 by the Hull, Barnsley and West Riding Junction Railway and Dock Act 1898 (61 & 62 Vict. c. clii). In June the following year, they doubled the line between Wrangbrook Junction and Hickleton as well as spurs to serve the collieries at Hickleton, Manvers and Wath. The line was opened for goods on 31 March 1902 and for passengers on 28 August the same year with intermediate stations at Moorhouse and South Elmsall and Hickleton and Thurnscoe. Passenger traffic, which ran to Kirk Smeaton on the H&B, ended on 6 April 1929, goods traffic between Wath and Hickleton ended on 2 October 1933, between Hickleton and Moorhouse on 31 May 1954 and on the remainder of the line on 1 October 1963. Certain lines around the southern terminus at Wath remained for use by the National Coal Board. These were closed with the Wath Main / Manvers Main complex in the 1980s.
