= Sprotborough (H&B) railway station =

Disused railway station in South Yorkshire, England

Sprotborough (H&B)
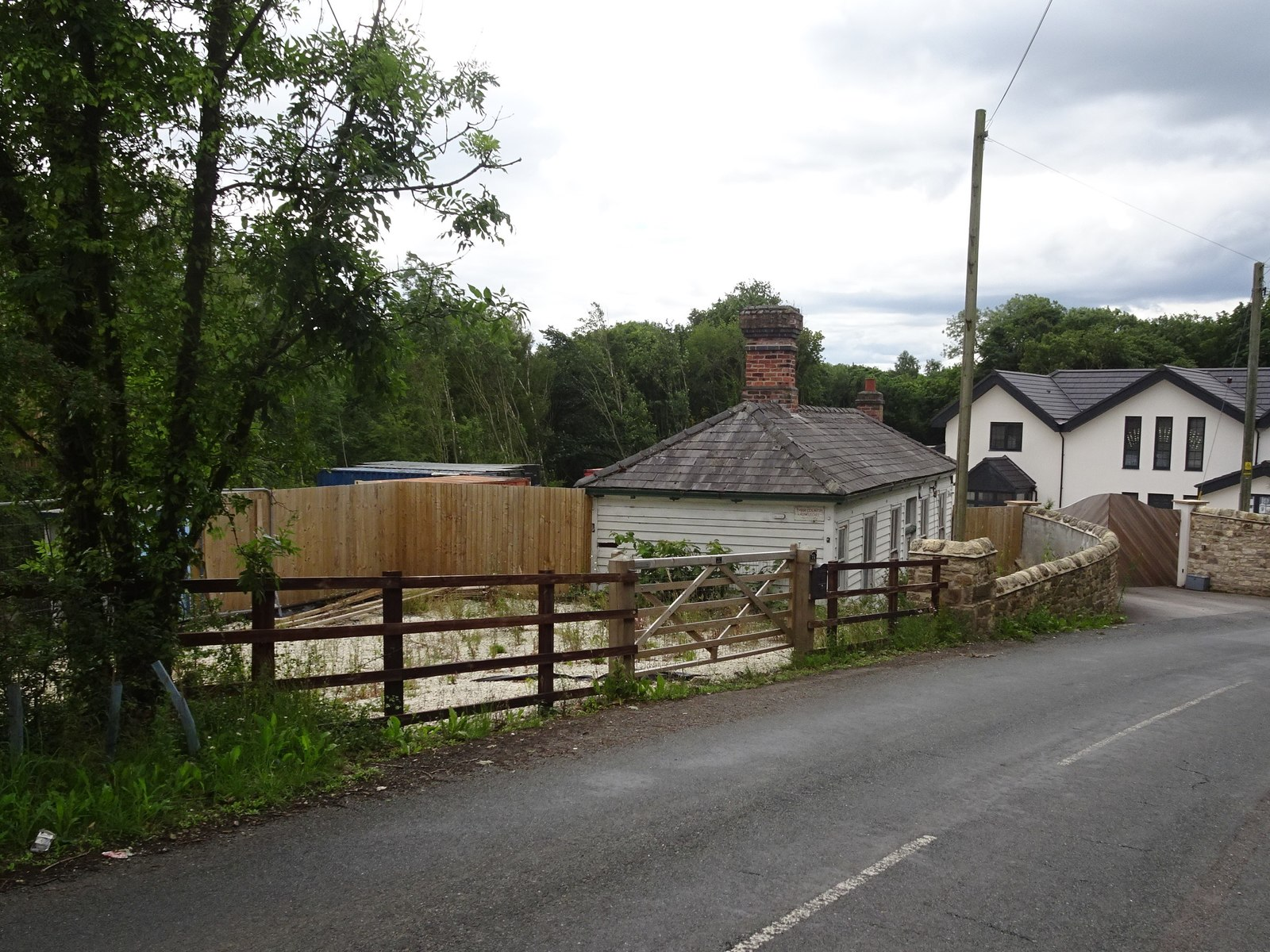
- Station remains in July 2020.

General information
- Location: Sprotborough, Doncaster; England
- Coordinates: 53.508325°N 1.198340°W
- Grid reference: SE532015
- Platforms: 2

Other information
- Status: Disused

History
- Original company: South Yorkshire Junction Railway

Key dates
- 1 December 1894: Opened
- 2 February 1903: Closed
Location

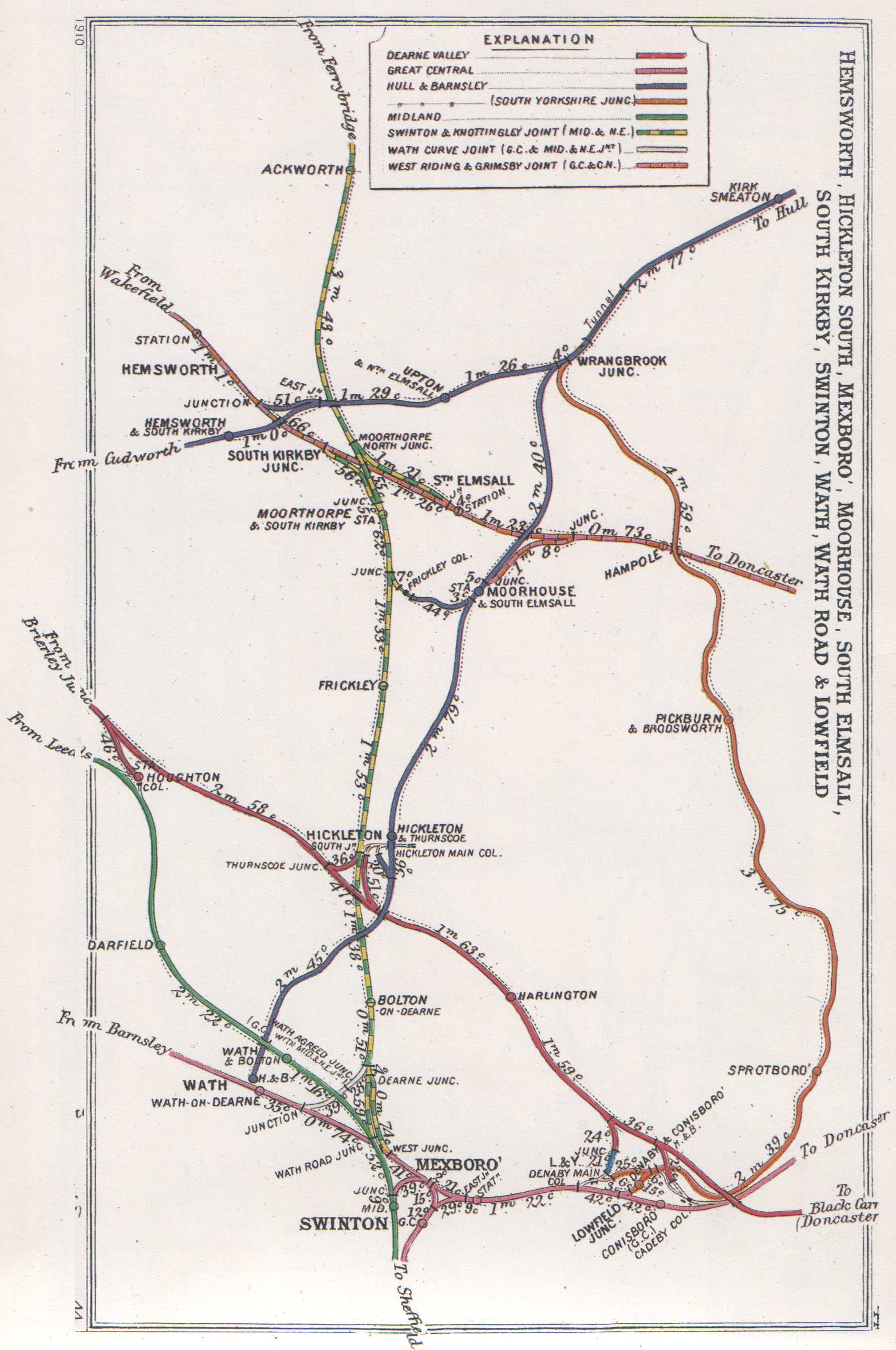
Railway Clearing House diagram including Sprotborough in 1910.

Sprotborough (H&B) railway station was a small station on the South Yorkshire Junction Railway, which ran south from Wrangbrook Junction, where it joined the main line of the Hull and Barnsley Railway. It was situated between Denaby and Conisbrough and Pickburn and Brodsworth station. See also Sprotborough (SYR) railway station.

== History ==
The station, consisting of two flanking platforms, was situated at a passing loop (which closed on 27 April 1967), on the single line railway. The main building, a single storey wooden structure with brick-built chimneys, was situated on the Hull-bound platform, as was the signal cabin which contained a 10 lever frame. The Denaby-bound platform was provided with a wooden waiting shelter. A house for the station master was built nearby and still stands.

The station opened on 1 December 1894. It closed to passengers on 2 February 1903, and totally in August 1964.

The village of Sprotborough had also been served by a station on the South Yorkshire Railway, half a mile to the south on the other side of the River Don near the village of Warmsworth. This station opened in 1850 but closed in 1875. To differentiate this is sometimes referred to as Sprotborough (SYR) railway station.

Preceding station	Disused railways	Following station
Denaby and Coninsbrough	South Yorkshire Junction Railway; South Yorkshire Junction Railway	Pickburn and Brodsworth
