= Hickleton and Thurnscoe Halt railway station =

Disused railway station in South Yorkshire, England

Hickleton and Thurnscoe Halt
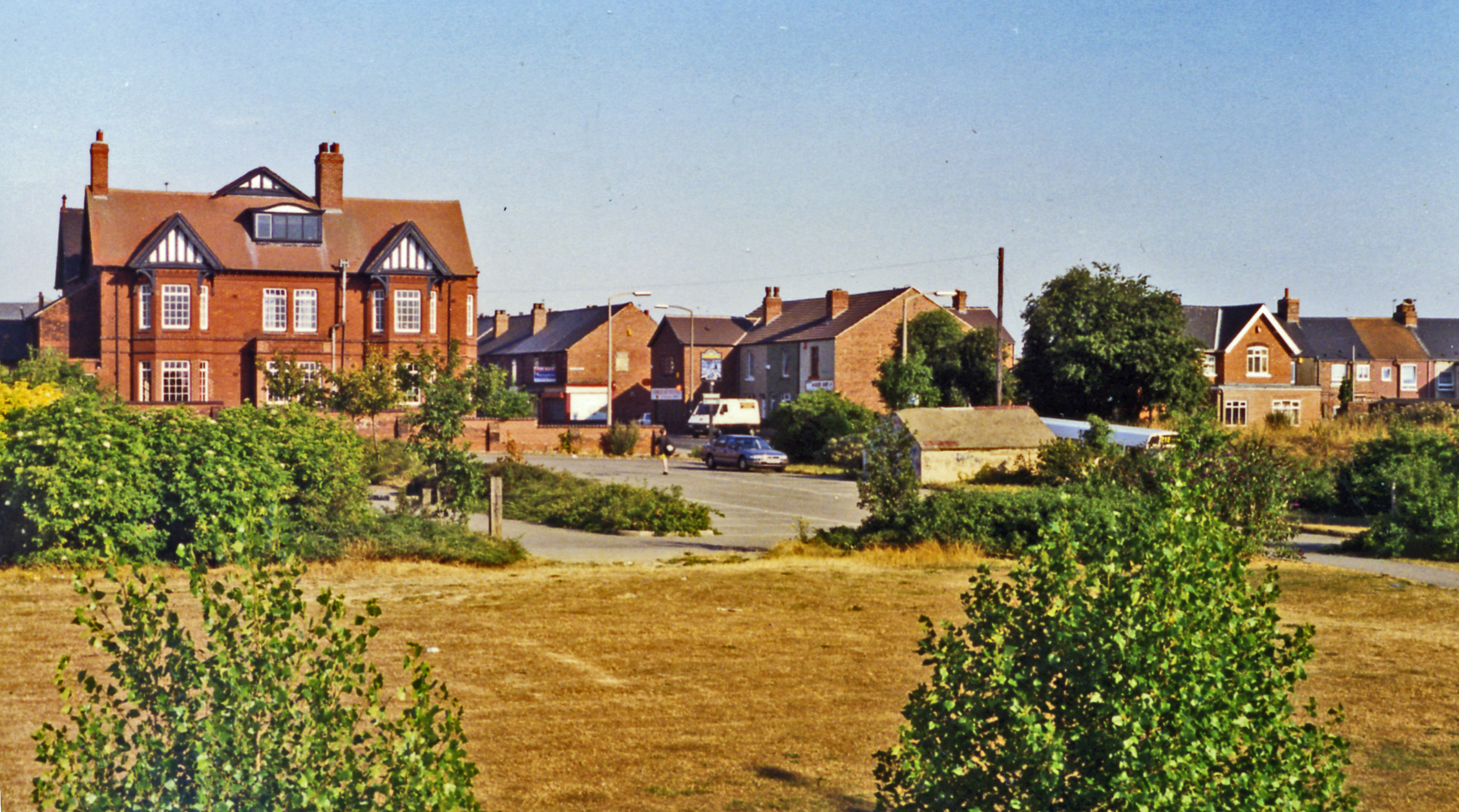
- Station location (1995)

General information
- Location: Thurnscoe, Barnsley; England
- Coordinates: 53.5440°N 1.3083°W
- Grid reference: SE459054
- Platforms: 1

Other information
- Status: Disused

History
- Original company: Hull and South Yorkshire Extension Railway
- Pre-grouping: Hull and Barnsley Railway
- Post-grouping: London and North Eastern Railway

Key dates
- 1902: opened
- 1929: closed
Location

Hickleton and Thurnscoe Halt was a small railway station on the Hull and Barnsley Railway line between Wrangbrook Junction and Wath-upon-Dearne. The halt was built to serve the mining villages of Hickleton and Thurnscoe, near Barnsley, South Yorkshire and was situated in the centre of Thurnscoe at the point where the line crosses over the main Barnsley road. Hickleton village was situated over 1/2 mile (0.8 km) away.

The station was situated 3 miles (4.8 km) south of Moorhouse and South Elmsall and consisted of a single wooden platform with a single storey "Double Pavilion" style wooden station building. The platform surface was of gravel and the station opened on 28 August 1902 and closed, along with the others on the line, on 6 April 1929.

The line was controlled by two standard H&B style signal boxes named "Hickleton Station" and "Hickleton Colliery".

Immediately south of the station was the entrance to Hickleton Main Colliery where the H&B shared sidings with the Swinton and Knottingley Joint Railway line.

Preceding station	Disused railways	Following station
Moorhouse and South Elmsall	Hull and Barnsley and Great Central Joint Railway (Wath Branch)	Wath
