= John Westwood (footballer) =

English footballer

Personal information
- Full name: John William Westwood
- Date of birth: 1886
- Place of birth: Sheffield, England
- Date of death: 1917 (aged 30–31)
- Place of death: France
- Position: Full-back

Senior career*
Years	Team	Apps	(Gls)
?–1904	Rotherham Town		
1904–1905	Gainsborough Trinity	40	(2)
1905–1909	Denaby United		
1909–1915	Bristol Rovers	98	(0)
- * Club domestic league appearances and goals

John William "Bill" Westwood (1886–1917) was a professional footballer, who played for Rotherham Town, Mexborough Town, Gainsborough Trinity, Denaby United and Bristol Rovers.

He played 98 times in the Southern League for Bristol Rovers before the First World War, until breaking his leg after which he returned to Mexborough where he had played previously.

He enlisted after the end of the 1914-15 season and was killed in action in France in the First World War, while serving as a corporal in the York and Lancaster Regiment. At the time of death his home was reportedly at Denaby Main near Mexborough.
