= Denaby Main =

Village in South Yorkshire, England

Coordinates: 53.4898°N 1.2554°W

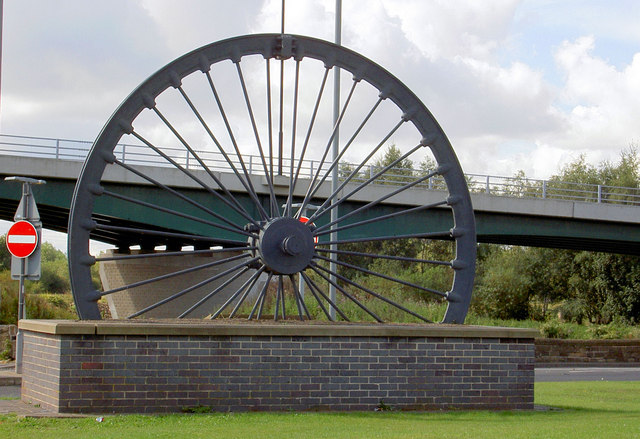
- Mining wheel at the entrance to Dearne Valley Leisure Centre

- Location within South Yorkshire
- OS grid reference: SK495995
- Metropolitan borough: Doncaster
- Metropolitan county: South Yorkshire
- Region: Yorkshire and the Humber
- Country: England
- Sovereign state: United Kingdom
- Post town: DONCASTER
- Postcode district: DN12
- Dialling code: 01709
- Police: South Yorkshire
- Fire: South Yorkshire
- Ambulance: Yorkshire
- UK Parliament: Rawmarsh and Conisbrough

Denaby Main is a village between Mexborough and Conisbrough in the Metropolitan Borough of Doncaster in South Yorkshire, England. The village falls within the Doncaster MBC ward of Conisbrough and Denaby. It was built by the Denaby Main Colliery Company to house its workers and their families, and originally given the name Denaby Main Colliery Village, to distinguish it from the village of Denaby, about 2/3 mi (1 km) away on the road to Hooton Roberts and Kilnhurst; from that time, the old village became known as Old Denaby. In due course the "Colliery Village" part of the name was lost, leaving the village to be known as Denaby Main.

== History ==
Around 1700 poor-quality coal was found, close by the surface, just over the River Don from Mexborough and this, in time, led to the sinking of two shafts, in 1863, for Denaby Main Colliery Company, owned by Messrs Pope and Pearson. The Barnsley bed was reached in September 1867 at a depth of more than 1,266 feet (386 m). In 1893 the company also opened Cadeby Main Colliery.

Around the time the miners were reaching the Barnsley bed, the colliery company began building housing for its workers and their families. A church, schools and a store were also company owned. The company pub, the Denaby Main Hotel, (locally known as "The Drum") is one of the few properties from that era still standing. As of 2008, it had become a balti restaurant.

The layout of the village was pure "Industrial Revolution": parallel streets of terraced houses running away from the Mexborough to Conisbrough road, which ran through the village, with, in its centre the library and park. It was possible from almost every street to look down to the colliery.

The village gained notoriety at the close of the 19th century as a result of a characterisation as "The Worst Village in England" in an edition of the magazine Christian Budget. This pejorative piece described somewhere,

... so repulsive that many who have never been near it will probably refuse to credit the story ...[where]... nearly all the men, and most of the women, devote their high wages to betting, where religion is forgotten, home life is shattered where immorality and intemperance are rife, where wives are sold like cattle, and children are neglected.(1899)

The village miners became noted for their fortitude in the face of hard and ruthless employers who had proven their willingness to take risks by sinking the shafts to their required depth. Although there were no major accidents at Denaby (unlike its neighbour Cadeby Main) by the time of the closure of the mine in 1968, 203 miners had been killed. It was company policy to evict a dead miner's family from the company owned housing within weeks of bereavement. There is a long history of disputes at Denaby. In 1869 a six-month strike over union recognition was ended by negotiation. In 1903 there was a strike because the mining company refused to pay miners for the muck that they had to get out in order to get at the coal. This became known as "The Bag Muck Strike". It lasted for weeks and the mine owners started to evict strikers and their families. Many of those evicted had to spend January 1903 in tents on open ground with only sheets and blankets for comfort and soup kitchens for food.

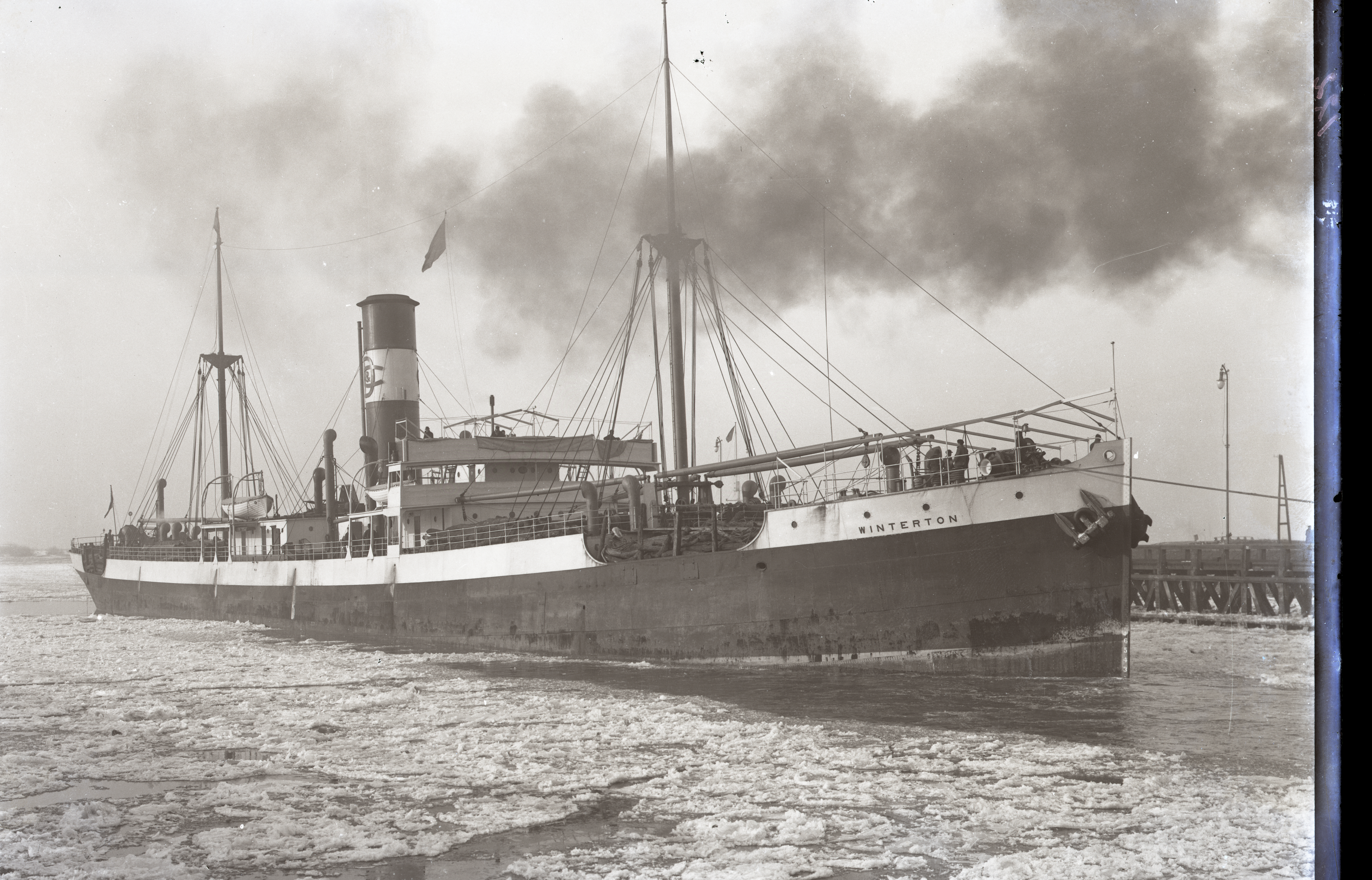
Winterton, a cargo ship built for Denaby and Cadeby Main Collieries in 1906

Other disputes in 1877 and 1885 also led to evictions. All of the coal at Denaby was "hand got", meaning that no machinery or conveyor belts were used. The Barnsley Seam coal was shovelled into corves for man handling along a track using pit ponies.

In 1863 alternative employment became available, when Kilner Glass opened a factory in Denaby adjacent to the mine. This closed in 1936.

Two railway stations served Denaby: Denaby Halt, some distance away on the Dearne Valley Railway and Denaby and Conisbrough, the southern terminal of the South Yorkshire Junction Railway. The nearest station now is Conisbrough.

== Rebuilding ==
Denaby Main colliery drew its last coal in 1968, and Cadeby Main in 1987. After these closures, the village was rebuilt. All the terraced houses were demolished and replaced with modern semi-detached properties on an open-plan scheme.

In 1987 the Miners' Memorial Chapel in All Saints' Church, Denaby opened, serving as a memorial to all those who had worked in the collieries of the area. It contains a pit wheel, salvaged from Cadeby Colliery, and the altar incorporates a one-ton block of coal from Manvers Main Colliery.

The village did have a non-league football side, Denaby United F.C. but it became defunct in 2002 when they lost access to their ground at Tickhill Square. Denaby Main Junior FC (with an adult Saturday side) was formed in 2012 and took the place of the former Denaby United.

== Administration ==
The village is in the Conisbrough ward of Doncaster Council and the parliamentary constituency of Don Valley.

== Notable people ==
- John Westwood (footballer) (1887–1917)
- Harry Allen (executioner) (1911–1992)
- Terri Harper (born 1996), English professional boxer
- Jon Jo Irwin (born 1969), English professional boxer

== See also ==
- List of Yorkshire Pits
- Listed buildings in Conisbrough and Denaby
