= Wath (Hull and Barnsley) railway station =

Disused railway station in South Yorkshire, England

Wath
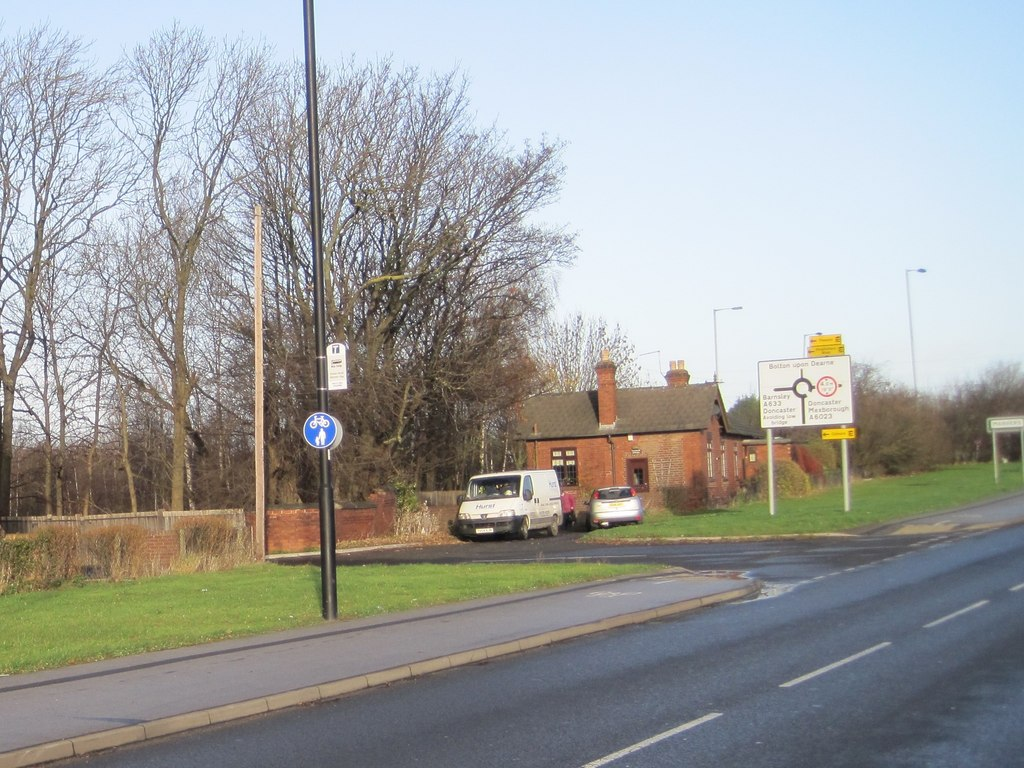
- Site of the former station (2013)

General information
- Location: Wath-upon-Dearne, Rotherham; England
- Coordinates: 53.507484°N 1.337388°W
- Grid reference: SE440014
- Platforms: 1

Other information
- Status: Disused

History
- Original company: Hull and South Yorkshire Extension Railway
- Pre-grouping: Hull and Barnsley Railway
- Post-grouping: London and North Eastern Railway

Key dates
- 1902: opened
- 1929: closed
Location

Wath railway station was one of three railway stations in Wath-upon-Dearne, South Yorkshire, England. It was the southern terminus of The Hull & South Yorkshire Extension Railway which became part of the Hull and Barnsley Railway in 1898 and was the southern terminus of a branch line from Wrangbrook Junction. The station was located on Station Road between the Great Central Railway's Wath Central station and the Midland Railway's Wath North station. Branch line trains connected with Sheffield-Cudworth-Hull trains at Wrangbrook.

The railway was opened for passengers on 28 August 1902, with Wath being 8 miles (13 km) from Wrangbrook Junction and 11 miles (18 km) from Kirk Smeaton, where the passenger service went to. However, the line was not a success for passenger traffic: it was closed to passengers on 6 April 1929. The station at Wath was a single platform affair but with a substantial station house. This and the former ticket office are the only surviving remains of the station and have survived the buildings of Wath's other two, more successful stations: they still stand on Station Road, called "Station House" and "Barnsley Cottage" respectively.

Preceding station	Disused railways	Following station
Terminus	Hull and Barnsley Railway	Hickleton and Thurnscoe
