= Denaby and Conisbrough railway station =

Disused railway station in South Yorkshire, England

Denaby and Conisbrough

General information
- Location: Conisbrough, Doncaster; England
- Coordinates: 53.49252°N 1.24482°W
- Grid reference: SK502997

Other information
- Status: Disused

History
- Pre-grouping: Hull and Barnsley Railway

Key dates
- 1 December 1894: opened
- 1903: closed
Location

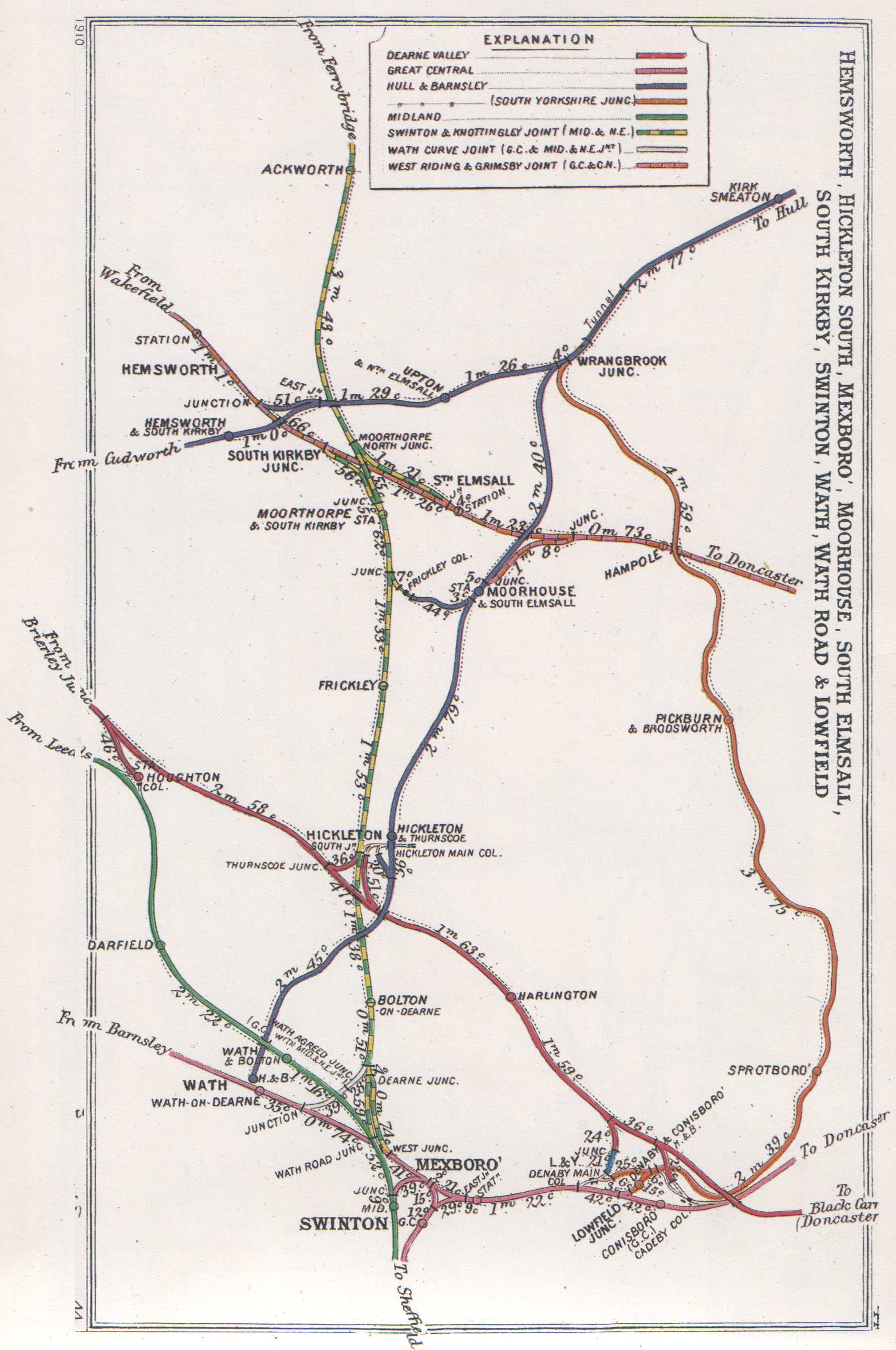
Railway Clearing House diagram including Denaby and Conisbrough in 1910.

Denaby and Conisbrough railway station was a small station, the southern terminus of the South Yorkshire Junction Railway branch from Wrangbrook Junction. The station, built to serve Denaby Main and Conisbrough, near Doncaster, South Yorkshire, England, was situated just to the north of the Mexborough to Doncaster line of the Manchester, Sheffield and Lincolnshire Railway, close by the road linking the villages in its name. Access to the station was by a subway under the G.C. line.

The line, promoted by the Denaby and Cadeby Colliery Company, was operated by the Hull and Barnsley Railway and connected at Wrangbrook with its main line between Cudworth, near Barnsley, and Hull.

The station was a wooden structure and its facilities included a locomotive shed to house the branch tank locomotive. This was destroyed by fire.

Originally there was no connection with the M.S.& L. R. line, this was not put in place until Great Central days, opening on 13 July 1908 in order for that company to reach Brodsworth Colliery.

The next station northwards was Sprotborough (H&B) railway halt.

The station closed on 2 February 1903 when passenger services were withdrawn.

Preceding station	Disused railways	Following station
Sprotborough	South Yorkshire Junction Railway; South Yorkshire Junction Railway	Terminus
