= South Yorkshire Junction Railway =

Disused railway in Yorkshire, England

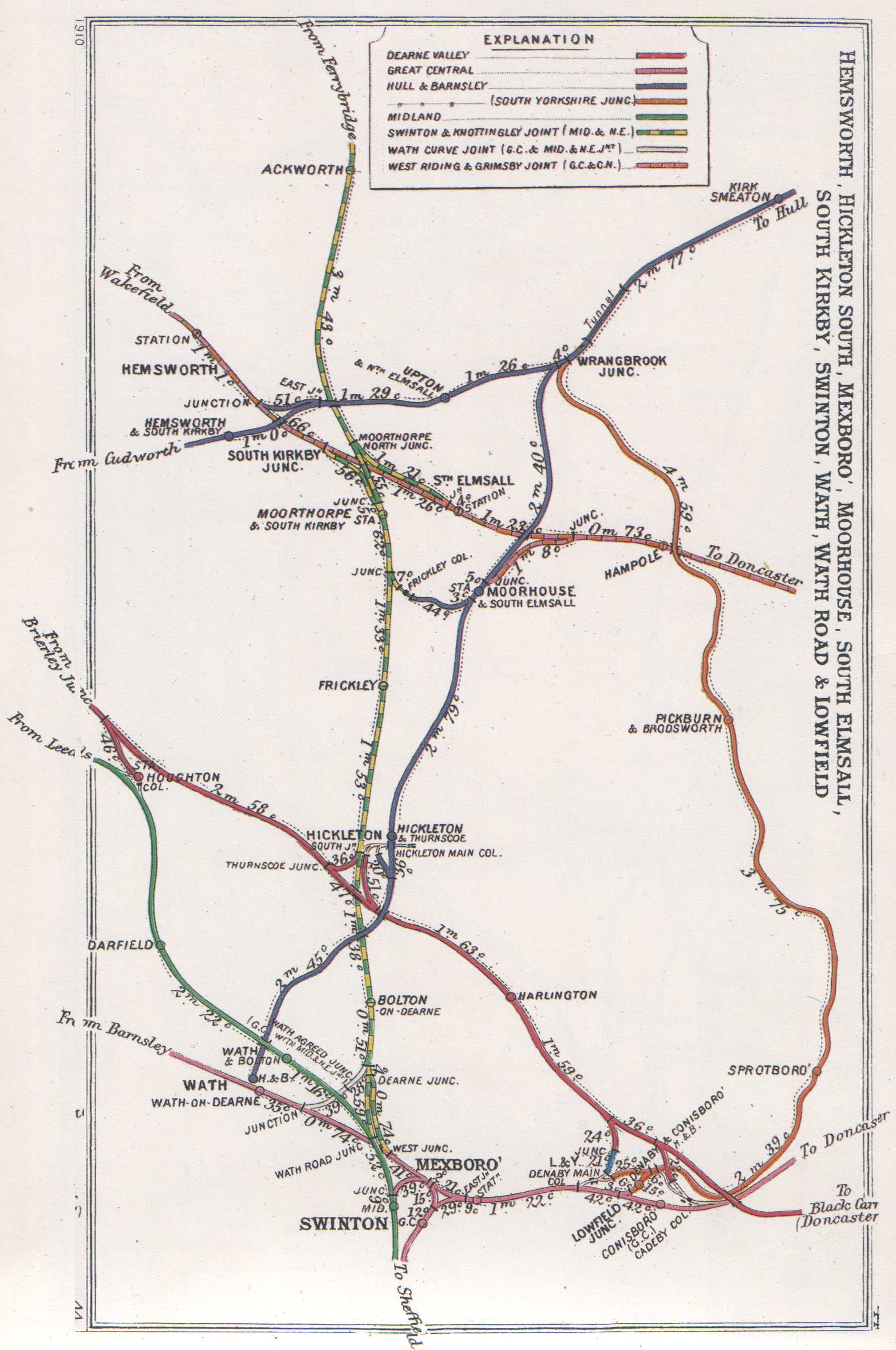
1910 Railway Clearing House diagram showing the route of the South Yorkshire Junction Railway.

The South Yorkshire Junction Railway was a railway which ran from Wrangbrook Junction on the main line of the Hull and Barnsley Railway to near Denaby Main Colliery Village, South Yorkshire. It was nominally an independent company sponsored by the Denaby and Cadeby Colliery Company but was worked by the Hull and Barnsley Railway.

== History ==
The SYJR received its act of Parliament, the South Yorkshire Junction Railway Act 1890 (53 & 54 Vict. c. ccxiii), on 14 August 1890, and opened for goods traffic on 1 September 1894 and for passengers on 1 December the same year. The passenger service lasted less than 9 years, the last trains running on 1 February 1903. Intermediate passenger stations were at Sprotborough and Pickburn and Brodsworth.

The Hull and Barnsley Railway was absorbed into the North Eastern Railway in 1922 and then to the London and North Eastern Railway at the Grouping.

== Infrastructure ==
The line was over 11 miles (18 km) in length, with many embankments and cuttings, it also had steep uphill grades in the northerly direction at parts, including a 1 in 100 rise after Denaby, and another steep rise near Wrangbrook, 3 miles (5 km) long being built at a grade of 1 in 100 or 1 in 112. It crossed the Great Northern and Great Central Joint line 2 1/2 miles (4 km) after Wrangbrook junction, a short tunnel "Cadeby Tunnel" was required around 1 1/2 miles (2.4 km) from the Denaby end, being about 250 yards (230 m) long. A branch to Brodsworth colliery was added in 1908 from Pickburn.

== Closure ==
Goods traffic lasted longer than passenger traffic. Most of the line, including the branch which served Brodsworth Colliery, was closed on 7 August 1967.

A short stub remained after this date, extending northwards from Lowfield Junction, the line's southern connection with the Great Central Railway's Doncaster-Sheffield line just west of Conisbrough station. This section ran to sidings serving a limestone quarry operated by the Steetley Dolomite company. It saw its last main line traffic in July 1975, although it continued to be used as a link by the National Coal Board to transfer traffic between Cadeby Colliery and Denaby Main Colliery, where the N.C.B. had wagon repair facilities, until the collieries closed in 1986.

== Acts ==
South Yorkshire Junction Railway Act 1890
- Act of Parliament
- Parliament of the United Kingdom
- Long title: An Act to authorise the construction of Railways in the West Riding of the County of York from Wrangbrook to Black Carr Junction with a Branch to Denaby and for other purposes.
- Citation: 53 & 54 Vict. c. ccxiii

Dates
- Royal assent: 14 August 1890

Text of statute as originally enacted

- South Yorkshire Junction Railway Act 1890 (53 & 54 Vict. c. ccxiii); An Act to authorise the construction of Railways in the West Riding of the County of York from Wrangbrook to Black Carr Junction with a Branch to Denaby and for other purposes.
  - "South Yorkshire Junction Railway. (Incorporation of Company; Construction of Railways and Junctions therewith from Wath to Denaby and Thorne, and from Wrangbrook to Black Carr Junction with a Branch Line from Cadeby to Conisbrough, in the West Riding of the County of York; Purchase of Lands, Compulsorily or by Agreement Levying Tolls; Working Agreements with the Manchester, Sheffield, and Lincolnshire, the Midland, the Great Eastern, the Great Northern, the London and North Western, the North Eastern, and the Hull, Barnsley, and West Riding Junction Railway and Dock Companies; Running Powers; Amendment of Acts.)", London Gazette (25996): 6631–6634, 26 November 1889

Hull and Barnsley and South Yorkshire Junction Railways Act 1891
- Act of Parliament
- Parliament of the United Kingdom
- Long title: An Act to confirm and give effect to an agreement for the working of certain parts of the South Yorkshire Junction Railway by the Hull Barnsley and West Riding Junction Railway and Dock Company.
- Citation: 54 & 55 Vict. c. clxiv

Dates
- Royal assent: 28 July 1891

Text of statute as originally enacted

- Hull and Barnsley and South Yorkshire Junction Railways Act 1891 (54 & 55 Vict. c. clxiv); An Act to confirm and give effect to an agreement for the working of certain parts of the South Yorkshire Junction Railway by the Hull Barnsley and West Riding Junction Railway and Dock Company.
  - "Hull, Barnsley, and "West Riding Junction Railway and Dock Company and South Yorkshire Junction Railway Company. (Confirmation of Agreement for Working Parts of South Yorkshire Junction Railway Company, Hull, Barnsley, &c. Company; Guarantee by that Company of Dividends and Interest on Share and Loan Capital of South Yorkshire Junction Railway Company; Constitution of Separate Undertaking of South Yorkshire Company ; Payment of Costs of Act; Amendment of Acts.)", London Gazette (26174): 3308–3309, 23 June 1891

South Yorkshire Junction Railway Act 1892
- Act of Parliament
- Parliament of the United Kingdom
- Long title: An Act to amend the Agreement scheduled to and confirmed by the Hull and Barnsley and South Yorkshire Junction Railways Act 1891 and to enable the South Yorkshire Junction Railway Company to raise further money and for other purposes.
- Citation: 55 & 56 Vict. c. i

Dates
- Royal assent: 20 May 1892

Text of statute as originally enacted

- South Yorkshire Junction Railway Act 1892 (55 & 56 Vict. c. i); An Act to amend the Agreement scheduled to and confirmed by the Hull and Barnsley and South Yorkshire Junction Railways Act 1891 and to enable the South Yorkshire Junction Railway Company to raise further money and for other purposes.

South Yorkshire Junction Railways Act 1894
- Act of Parliament
- Parliament of the United Kingdom
- Long title: An Act to extend the time for the completion of certain authorised railways of the South Yorkshire Junction Railway Company and revive the powers for the purchase of lands for such railways and for other purposes.
- Citation: 57 & 58 Vict. c. lxxvii

Dates
- Royal assent: 3 July 1894

Text of statute as originally enacted

- South Yorkshire Junction Railways Act 1894 (57 & 58 Vict. c. lxxvii); An Act to extend the time for the completion of certain authorised railways of the South Yorkshire Junction Railway Company and revive the powers for the purchase of lands for such railways and for other purposes.
  - "South Yorkshire Junction Railway. (New Railways in the West Riding of the County of York; Acquisition of Lands Cornpulsorily or by Agreement ; Revival and Extension of Time for Purchase of Lands and Construction of Works; .Tolls; Running Powers; Agreements between the Company, the Great Northern Railway Company, the Great Eastern Railway Company, the Hull, Barnsley, and West Riding Junction Railway and Dock Company, or any of them; Subscriptions, Guarantees, &c., by Railway Companies; Additional Capital; Payment of Interest, out of Capital; Amendment of Acts.)", London Gazette (26461): 6904–6906, 24 November 1893

South Yorkshire Junction Railway Act 1897
- Act of Parliament
- Parliament of the United Kingdom
- Long title: An Act for the abandonment of parts of the Railways authorised by the South Yorkshire Junction Railway Act 1890, and for other purposes.
- Citation: 60 & 61 Vict. c. viii

Dates
- Royal assent: 8 April 1897

Text of statute as originally enacted

- South Yorkshire Junction Railway Act 1897 (60 & 61 Vict. c. viii); An Act for the abandonment of parts of the Railways authorised by the South Yorkshire Junction Railway Act 1890, and for other purposes.
  - "South Yorkshire Junction Railway (Abandonment) (Abandonment of Railways; Release of Deposit; Repeal or Amendment of Acts.)", London Gazette (26797): 6845, 24 November 1896
