= Timeline of Kingston upon Hull =

Coordinates: 53.744333°N 0.3325°W

The following is a timeline of the history of the city of Kingston upon Hull, East Riding of Yorkshire, England.

== Pre history–15th century ==
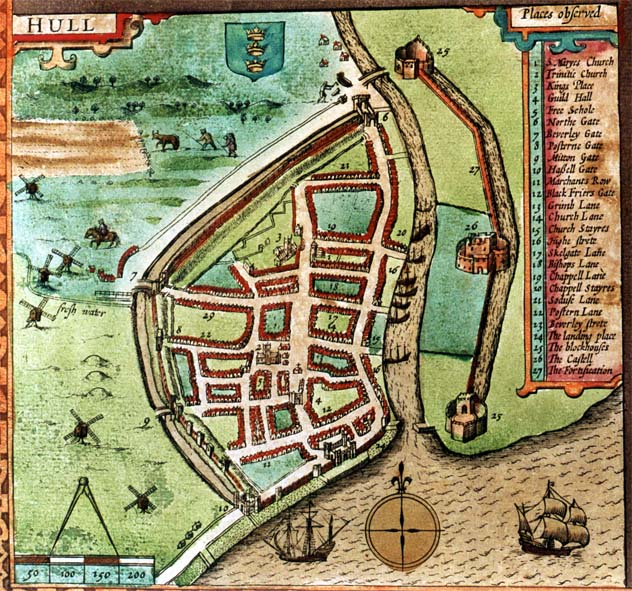
Map of Hull, 1611

- c.4900–4000 BC – Hunter-gatherers are present in Sutton-on-Hull, in the north of present-day Kingston upon Hull
- 750–500 BC – A Bronze Age settlement is present on the site of modern-day Alexandra Dock.
- 1086 – The Domesday Book records settlements at Sutton-on-Hull, Drypool, Marfleet, Myton and Southcoates.
- 1275 – Wyke, an area in Kingston upon Hull, is appointed as the customs head port for the north of England.
- 1279 – Market active.
- 1282 – Fresh water supply established for the town from Anlaby.
- 1293
  - Wyke is bought by Edward I.
  - Hull Fair begins.
- 1295 – Parliamentary representation begins.
- 1299 – Town Charter granted and town renamed "Kingston-upon-Hull."
- 1302 – Quay built.
- 1312 – Holy Trinity Church built (approximate date).
- 1321–24 – Defences consisting of a ditch and wooden palisade are built around the town.
- 1331–34 – A meat market is created.
- 1332 – William de la Pole becomes the first mayor of Hull.
- 1333 – First documented mention of a guildhall in Kingston upon Hull.
- 1369 – Trinity House for seamen established.
- 1377 – Population of 1,557 adult taxpayers are recorded through poll tax records.
- 1384 – Charter-House Hospital founded.
- 1402 – Rioting occurs against the mayor.
- 1440 – Town incorporated and is made its own county.
- 1447 – The county of Hull is expanded by over 5 miles on the west side of the town.
- 1486 – Grammar school founded.

== 16th–18th century ==
- 1515 – A fish market is created.
- 1536 – The Pilgrimage of Grace spreads to Hull.
- 1537 – Plague breaks out in Hull.
- 1541 – The town is visited by Henry VIII.
- 1539 – The last two monastic houses are closed because of the Suppression of Religious Houses Act 1535.
- 1575–76 – Outbreak of the plague.
- 1588 – Repairs are made to the city walls.
- 1602–04 – Outbreak of the plague.
- 1637 – Outbreak of the plague.
- 1640 – King Charles visits.
- 1642 – Siege of Hull by Parliamentarians.
- 1673 – Hull has 1,373 households and a population of 6,500.
- 1681–90 – Hull Citadel is built.
- 1688 – 'Town-taking': townspeople overthrow the Catholic governor.
- 1716 – Trinity House marine school founded.
- 1739 – Hull's first newspaper, the Hull Courant, is published.
- 1773 – Hull Dock Company formed.
- 1775 – Hull Subscription Library established.
- 1778 – Dock built.
- 1780
  - William Wilberforce becomes Member of Parliament for Hull.
  - Jewish community establishes synagogue.
- 1782 – General Infirmary established.
- 1792 – St John's Church built.
- 1797 – Cooperative mill built.

== 19th century ==
- 1801 – The population of the town is 22,161.
- 1809 – Humber Dock built.
- 1829
  - United Gaol and House of Correction in operation.
  - Junction Dock built.
  - St Charles Borromeo church opens.
- 1836 – Police force established.
- 1837
  - Drypool and Sculcoates become part of the borough of Hull.
  - Explosion of the Union Steam Packet in June
- 1840
  - Hull and Selby Railway begins operating.
  - Zoological Gardens established.
- 1841 – Thomas Wilson and Company (shipping) in business.
- 1846 – Railway Dock is established.
- 1850 – Victoria Dock built.
- 1851 – Population of Hull is 84,690.
- 1854
  - Royal Institution opens.
  - Hull and Holderness Railway begins operating.
  - Junction Dock is renamed Prince's Dock.
- 1860 – Pearson Park established.
- 1861
  - Hull School of Art founded.
  - Population: 93,955.
- 1864 – Londesborough Barracks completed.
- 1865 – Hull Football Club founded.
- 1866 – Town Hall, and Exchange built.
- 1867 – Hull and East Riding College opens.
- 1869 – Albert Dock is established.
- 1870 – HM Prison Hull in operation.
- 1873 – William Wright Dock is established.
- 1875 – Tram in operation.
- 1880 – Botanic garden opens.
- 1881 – Hull Philharmonic Society founded.
- 1882
  - Marfleet becomes part of the borough of Hull.
  - Kingston Amateurs rugby club formed.
- 1883 – St Andrew's Dock is established.
- 1884 – Hull Amateur Photographic Society founded.
- 1885
  - Hull and Barnsley Railway begins operating.
  - Alexandra Dock built.
  - Hull Daily Mail newspaper begins publication.
- 1886 – Synagogue established.
- 1887
  - East Park opens.
  - First women's rugby match is played in Hull.
- 1888 – County borough created per Local Government Act 1888.
- 1892 – Hull Amalgamated Anglers' Association formed.
- 1895 – The Boulevard (stadium) opens.
- 1897 – Hull attains city status.
- 1898 – The Circle cricket ground is established.

== 20th century ==
- 1901 – Hull's population is 236,772.
- 1902 – Hull Telephone Department licensed.
- 1904 – Hull City Association Football Club formed.
- 1906 – Wilberforce and Historical Museum opens.
- 1907 – Riverside Quay is established.
- 1909 – Hull City Hall built.
- 1911
  - Theatre De Luxe opens.
  - Hull's population is 277,991.
- 1912 – Museum of Fisheries and Shipping and Coliseum theatre open.
- 1914 – King George Dock is established.
- 1915 – Pavilion Picture Palace opens.
- 1921
  - Hull's population is 295,017.
  - First women's football match takes place in Hull.
- 1922 – Craven Park inaugurated.
- 1927
  - University College Hull established.
  - Sutton become part of the borough of Hull.
  - Ferens Art Gallery is established.
- 1931 – Hull's population is 309,198.
- 1937 – Trolleybus begins operating.
- 1939 – Hull New Theatre opens.
- 1940 – 19 June: Aerial bombing by German forces begins.
- 1945 – 17 March: Aerial bombing by German forces ends.
- 1946 – Boothferry Park (stadium) opens.
- 1951 – Hull's population is 295,172.
- 1961 – Hull's population is 289,716.
- 1966 – Closure of Western General Hospital.
- 1968 – Prince's Dock and Railway Dock are closed to shipping.
- 1971
  - Hull Truck Theatre founded.
  - Hull's population is 285,965.
- 1972 – Hull City Council established.
- 1974
  - City becomes part of Humberside shire county per Local Government Act 1972.
  - Airport opens in Kirmington.
  - Humberside Police established.
- 1981
  - Humber Bridge opens.
  - Two tornadoes touch down in Hull during the record-breaking nationwide tornado outbreak of 23 November 1981, causing damage to the Port of Hull and the city's north-eastern residential suburbia.
  - Hull's population is 266,751.
- 1983 – Hull Marina opens.
- 1985 – St Andrew's Dock closes to shipping.
- 1986 – Sister city relationship established with Raleigh, USA.
- 1987 – Spurn Lightship museum opens.
- 1989 – Streetlife Museum of Transport and new Craven Park (stadium) open.
- 1991
  - Princes Quay shopping centre opens.
  - Hull's population is 266,180.
- 1993 – Humber Mouth literature fest begins.
- 1996 – Hull becomes a unitary authority area.
- 1999 – Arctic Corsair museum ship opens.

== 21st century ==
- 2000 – Closure of Kingston General Hospital.
- 2001
  - Hull Soul Club (music appreciation group) formed.
  - Hull's population is 243,589.
- 2002 – The Deep (aquarium) and KC Stadium open.
- 2007
  - Hull Paragon Interchange transport complex and St Stephen's Hull shopping centre open.
  - June: Flooding occurs in Hull. 35,000 people are effected.
  - Hull Comedy Festival begins.
- 2008 – The first Freedom Festival (cultural event) takes place.
- 2010
  - Hull History Centre established.
  - Larkin 25 fest held.
- 2011 – Boothferry Park stadium is demolished.
- 2013 – Scale Lane Bridge for pedestrians opens.
- 2014 – Legal sanctions against prostitution introduced.
- 2017
  - Hull is the UK City of Culture.
  - 13 May: Holy Trinity Church rededicated as Hull Minster.
- 2018
  - January: Banksy work on Scott Street Bridge discovered.
  - 25 July: Bonus Arena opens
- 2019
  - October: Hull becomes the first UK city to have full fibre broadband available for all residents.

== See also ==
- History of Kingston upon Hull
- List of mayors of Kingston upon Hull
- List of governors of Kingston upon Hull
- Timelines of other cities in Yorkshire and the Humber: Bradford, Sheffield, York
