= List of areas in Kingston upon Hull =

This is a list of areas in Kingston upon Hull, England.

== Within Hull unitary authority ==
=== East Hull ===
- Bilton Grange Estate
- Bransholme
- Drypool
  - Garrison Side
  - The Groves
- Garden Village
- Kingswood
- Longhill
- Marfleet
- Greatfield Estate
- Preston Road Estate
- Southcoates
- Stoneferry
- Summergangs
- Sutton Ings
- Sutton-on-Hull
- Victoria Dock Village
- Wilmington

=== West Hull ===
- Anlaby Common
  - Anlaby Park
  - East Ella
- The Avenues
- Dairycoates
- Gipsyville
- Inglemire
- Newland
  - Newland Park
- North Hull Estate
- Orchard Park Estate
- Sculcoates
- Stepney

== Outside the unitary authority ==
=== Suburbs of Hull ===
- Anlaby
- Anlaby Common
- Kirk Ella
- Willerby

=== Satellite towns and villages ===
- Bilton
- Cottingham
- Dunswell
- Hedon
- Hessle
- Preston
- Salt End
- Swanland
- Wawne
