= Preston Road Estate =

Area of Kingston upon Hull, East Riding of Yorkshire, England

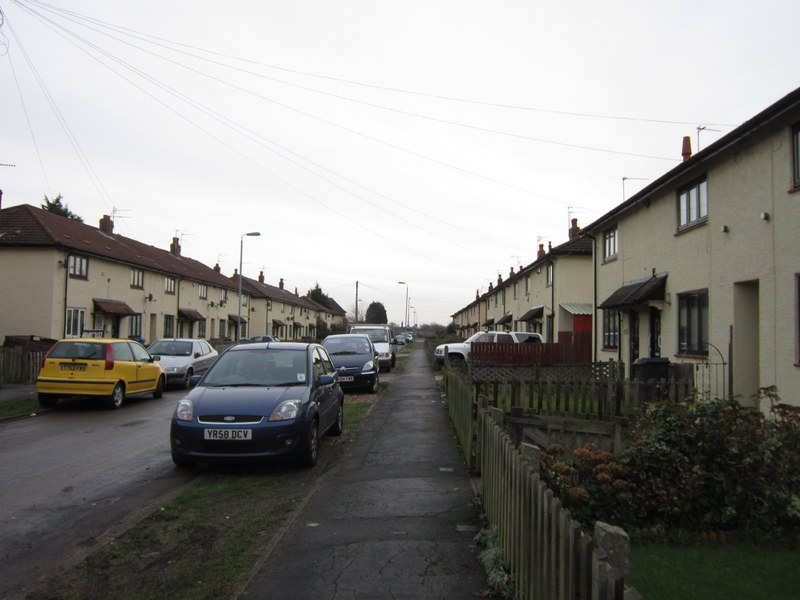
Original housing, Brigham Grove, Preston Road Estate (2012)

Preston Road Estate, also known as the East Hull Estate, is a housing estate in the east of Kingston upon Hull built from the 1920s to the 1940s by Hull Corporation. At the beginning of the 21st century considerable redevelopment of the estate took place, with a large community centre established, and demolition or modification of older substandard houses.

The Eastern Cemetery established 1931 at the east of the estate is contemporary with the original build. The estate contains few structures of note, excluding the large Archbishop Sentamu Academy.

== Geography ==
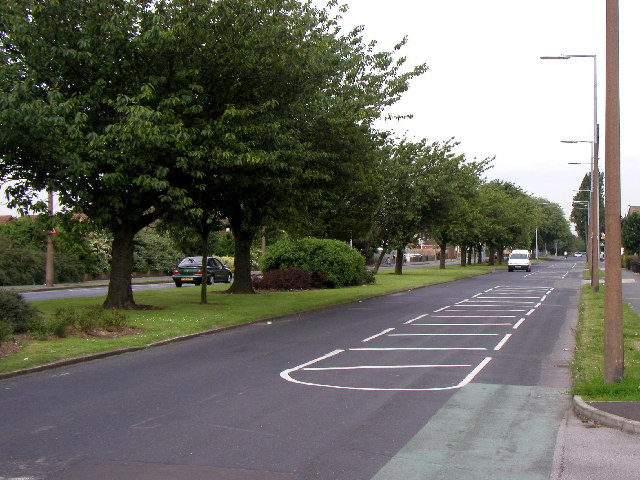
Eastern end of Preston Road (2005)

The Preston Road Estate is the south-eastern part of Hull, east of the river, between the main Holderness Road (A165) and Hedon Road (A1033). It is located along, and to the north and south of the east–west running dual carriageway Preston Road, which crosses the north–south running Holderness Drain in approximately the middle of the estate. (Note: 53.758043°N 0.282483°W, Preston Road crossing of Holderness Drain) The modern Archbishop Sentamu Academy and community centre, the "Freedom Centre" are located close to this crossing.

The area is almost exclusively used for housing, excluding playing fields and allotments. The surface is flat, and consistently under 5 metres (16 ft) above sea level. To the west is Southcoates; north-west Summergangs and the Holderness Road; to the north-east is the Bilton Grange Estate; and to the east is the Greatfield Estate – all predominately housing areas. To the south the landscape becomes industrial – an ancillary area to the Alexandra Dock and King George Docks that also contains Hull Prison and the former village of Marfleet – the southern boundary is formed by a cycle path, the former route of the Hull and Holderness Railway, as well as by part of the Hull Docks Branch railway line.

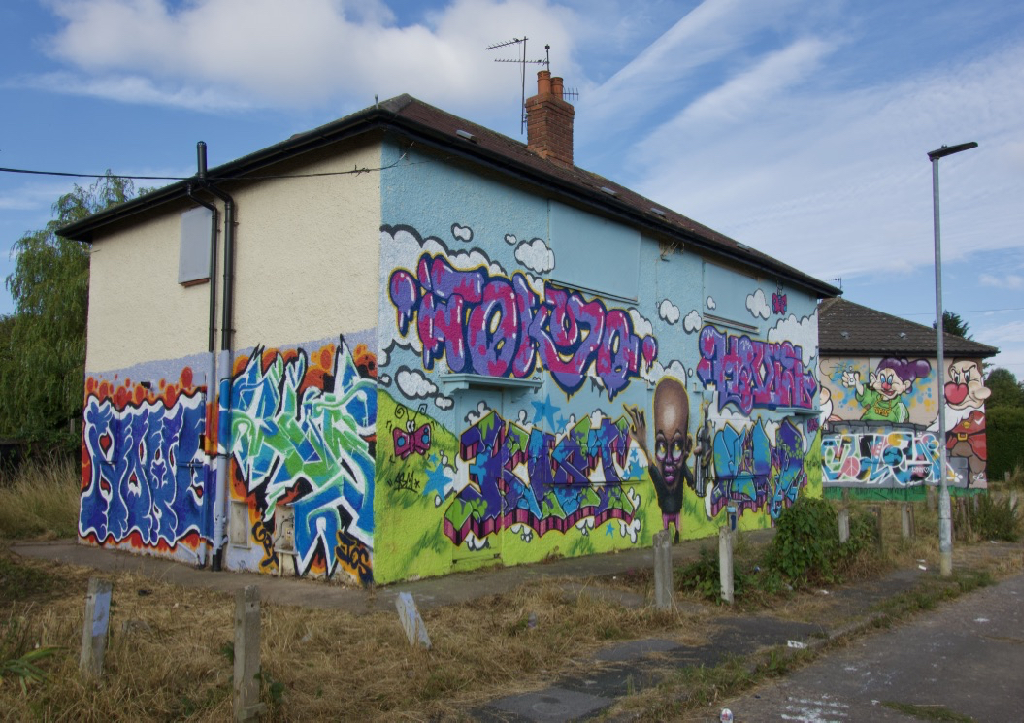
Urban decay on Preston Road

As of 2011 47% of the housing stock was semi-detached, and 40% terraced. In 2011 the area had high levels of unemployment, with 61% of the housing in the area rented social housing, and 30% owner occupied.

== History ==
=== Background and construction ( –1945) ===
In 1850 the area of the future estate was completely rural, consisting of enclosed drained fields. To the north-west Southcoates was a small hamlet, as was Marfleet to the south. The Hull and Holderness Railway (built c. 1850) ran east–west to the south; the Holderness Drain (built 1760s onwards) was the major feature in the landscape. By 1910 there had been some north-eastward expansion of Hull from Drypool along either side of the Holderness Road, reaching the edge of the grounds of the future estate.

Development of the Preston Road Estate began in the 1920s. By the mid 1920s Preston Road had been laid out, connecting at the end of Southcoates Lane in the west to Marfleet Lane in the east. (Note: Preston Road ran eastwards in the direction of Preston, East Riding of Yorkshire but did not link to that village.) The initial development of the estate was west of the Holderness Drain, around Pembroke and St John's groves. Flinton Grove school was established in 1928 in temporary accommodation, with permanent buildings opened in 1931. The temporary building were destroyed during the Second World War. After several reorganisations and splits. the school amalgamated with Southcoates Junior High school in 1980, and was renamed Foredyke Junior High School. (Note: 53.754328°N 0.283911°W, Foredyke school)

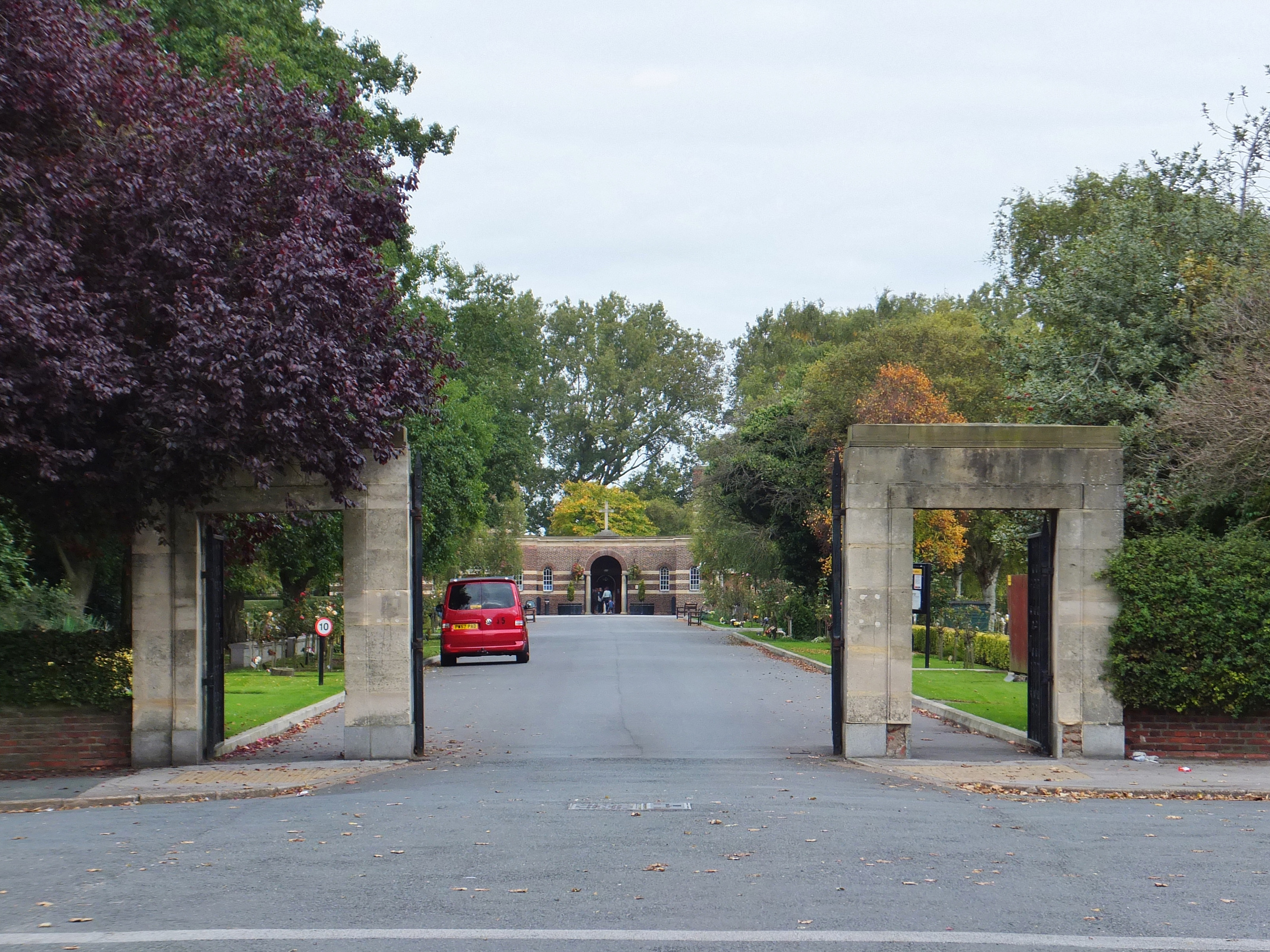
Entrance to the Eastern Cemetery, with chapel beyond. Built 1931 (2008)

The 59 acres (24 ha) Eastern Cemetery was established 1931, on the eastern edge of the estate. (Note: 53.758293°N 0.263582°W, Eastern Cemetery) The cemetery's chapel, in a striped polychrome brick and limestone Neo-Romanesque style also dates to 1931 and was listed in 2006. It contains the war graves of 95 Commonwealth service personnel of World War II. A branch library was opened in 1935, and a Methodist church in 1937, both on Preston Road. (Note: Both on the north side of Preston Road, just west of the Holderness Drain. There was also a Baptist mission church on Marfleet Lane, est. 1938, north of Willow farm.) An Anglican church, St George, was established on Marfleet Lane in 1938 as a subsidiary of the parish of Marfleet. A tower and sanctuary was added c. 1955. (Note: 53.760553°N 0.272145°W, St George's church (site of)) The church closed 2009, and was demolished c. 2011.

By the late 1930s the estate was extensive (or under construction) along both sides of the Holderness Drain, and on both sides of Preston Road, and an extension north-east of Marfleet Lane and Preston Road to a similar plan centred on Wingfield and Swanfield Roads was also being built.

By the mid 1940s the entire development area was full of housing, excluding some ground used for allotments or playing fields. The extents were defined by the Marfleet Old Drain and Poorhouse Lane to the east, by Hopewell Road and Portobello Street to the north, and by the Holderness railway line to the south. The northeasternmost extent of the estate included a new school; (Note: 53.763836°N 0.262379°W, Hopefield Road school site) (Note: The school and direct environs may be referred to as being in the Bilton Grange Estate, but they are contemporary with the Preston Road scheme, with a matching street plan design, differing from the Bilton Grange road plan designs.) the school Estcourt High had been relocated from Southcoates after the original had been destroyed by bombing during the Hull Blitz. (Note: The Hopewell Road school building was built during the Second World War, and opened 1941, as a junior school. Girls displaced from the destroyed Escort school admitted in 1945. The girls (senior) department admitted boys in 1973 was renamed Bilton Grange High. Both the junior and senior schools closed in 1988, and the site was reorganised as Archbishop Thurston comprehensive CE school.)

=== 1945 – 2000 ===
In the post-Second World War period Hull Corporation created several new housing estates in east Hull – these were Bilton Grange, Longhill and Greatfield Estate – constructed to the east and north-east of the Preston Road Estate, with the Bilton and Greatfield estates being adjacent. Building developments in the estate remained mostly unchanged through the remainder of the 20th century. In 1963, a new secondary Roman Catholic school, St Richard's was established in the south-east of the estate, off Marfleet Lane, (Note: 53.755396°N 0.272447°W, St Richards RC school) (as of 2016 a Voluntary Catholic Academy and primary school).

In the early 20th century a farm, Willow Farm had been established in a place called Swan Field off Marfleet Lane. (Note: 53.759783°N 0.274174°W, Willow farm (site of) / Bessingby Grove) The farm was eventually surrounded by the estate, and was demolished by the 1970s. By the 1980s housing around Bessinby Grove had been built in the former field. Bessingby Grove now (2016) functions as a sheltered housing facility. Craven Park rugby ground was opened at the south-eastern edge of the estate in 1989. (Note: 53.753963°N 0.265092°W, Craven Park)

=== 2000 – present ===
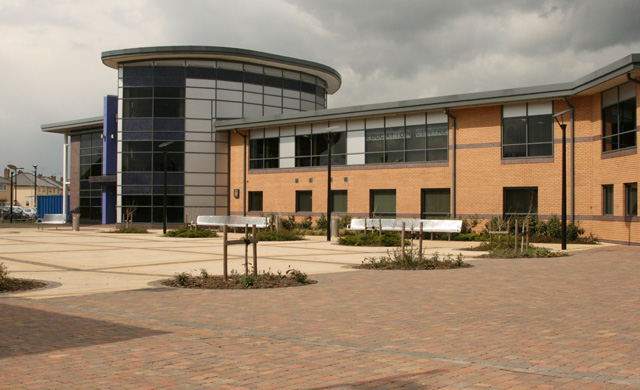
Freedom Centre, built 2005 (2008)

In 2000 the estate received £53 million (over 10 years) regeneration funding as part of the New Deal for Communities scheme. The funding was used to provide new social facilities including parks, play areas and a new 'village centre' with both civic and commercial facilities. The new community centre was given planning permission in 2002, to be built a site cleared of estate housing around Ryehill Grove adjacent to the Holderness Drain and Preston Road. The new centre, named "The Freedom Centre", opened in 2005. (Note: 53.758730°N 0.284717°W, The Freedom Centre)

New school building took place in the area in the 2000s, funded by the Building Schools for the Future scheme: in 2008 plans were submitted for a new large academy school on the north side of Preston Road, directly east of the drain, requiring demolition of several streets of housing. Plans for the new school, to be called Archbishop Sentamu Academy, were finalised in 2009. The school opened in 2011. (Note: 53.758605°N 0.280509°W, Archbishop Sentamu Academy) In 2011 a plan to demolish the existing school buildings on the Hopewell Road site (the then "Archbishop Sentamu Academy", (Note: The Archbishop Sentamu having opened at a new site on Preston Road in 2011) since 1988 "Archbishop Thurstan school") and construct a new special educational school with onsite accommodation was submitted. This was to transfer facilities from the Oakfield school formerly on Inglemire Lane, Newland, Kingston upon Hull. The new school was completed in 2013 and was officially opened in 2014.

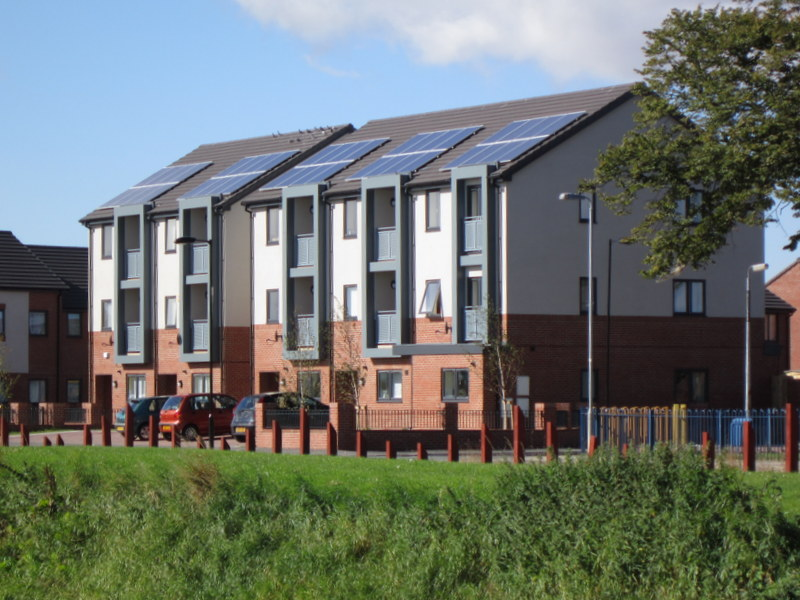
c. 2010 Gateway/Chevin Housing Group houses, Exeter Grove (2012)

Construction for Gateway(Hull)/Chevin Housing Group of 65 new houses in the Pembroke Grove/College Grove area of the estate was permitted in 2010, on land that had been cleared of housing c. 2005.

In 2011 Hull City Council published a finalised Holderness Road Corridor Area Action Plan, which included the Preston Road area in its remit. The report identified the 'Winget' housing type as problematic, and made it an objective to resolve the problems associated with that housing type, and/or provide new housing, as well as improving the general environment of the estate, additional changes included a new secondary school (Academy) on Preston Road.

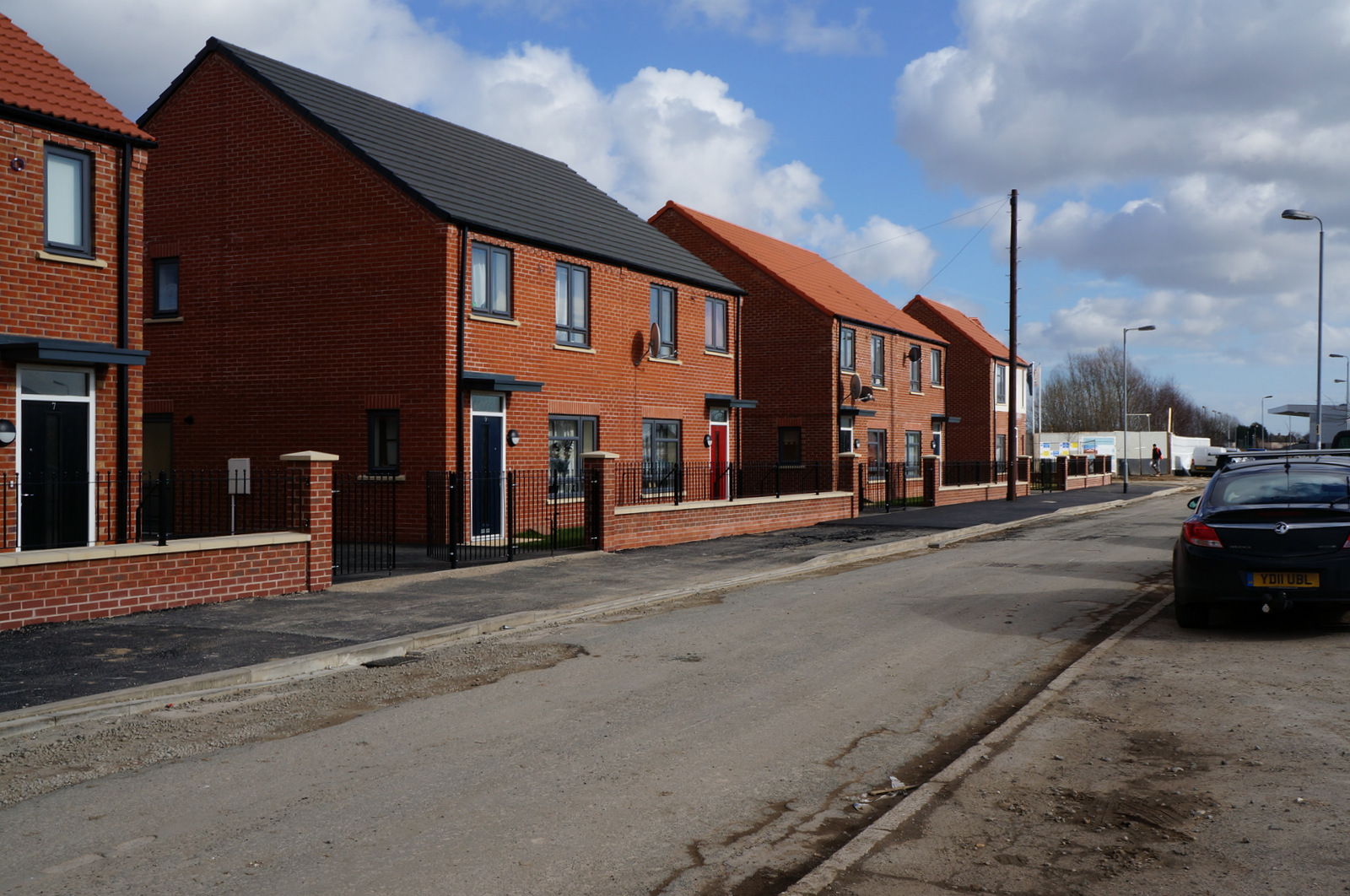
c. 2013 Keepmoat/Sanctuary/HCC houses, Wyton Grove (2015)

In 2013 permission was given for the construction of 175 houses in the Ganstead Road area of the estate. The site had been cleared of Boot house type (Henry Boot Construction) houses in the late 1990s, due to carbonatation problems in their concrete structures. Construction work by Keepmoat for Sanctuary Group/Hull City Council began on the first 54 houses at the site in December 2013.

In 2013 the City Council committed to a continuation of the housing stock renewal scheme, Preston Road Renewal Programme, starting in 2014. The scheme identified 540 for demolition, 300 for refurbishment, with 1,000 new houses built. Demolitions and refurbishments were to be mainly on concrete 'Winget' type housing. Refurbished properties were to have structural reinforcement and external wall insulation added. The area to be demolished for redevelopment was located between the Holderness Drain and Marfleet Lane, south of Preston Road. The properties listed for refurbishment were the houses on the inside of the area formed by Marfleet Lane, Mappleton Grove and Bilton Grove; and in the Downing Grove area. New build houses were to be built around Ganstead Grove to the north-west, and to the north on either side of the Holderness Drain near the Maybury Road bridge. (Note: Some of the new housing was to be in the Southcoates area – on a former industrial site, east of Southcoates Lane; and at the former David Lister School site.) Construction at the Ganstead Grove site began in July 2015.

== Gallery ==
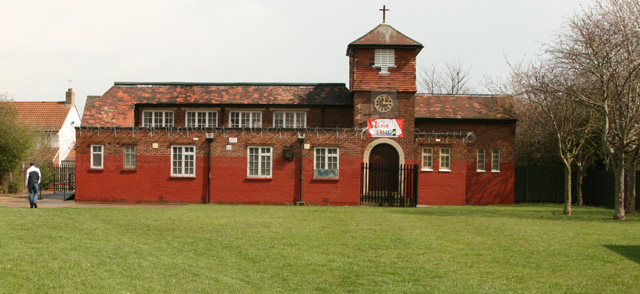
St George's church, Marfleet Lane (dem. c. 2011) (2008)

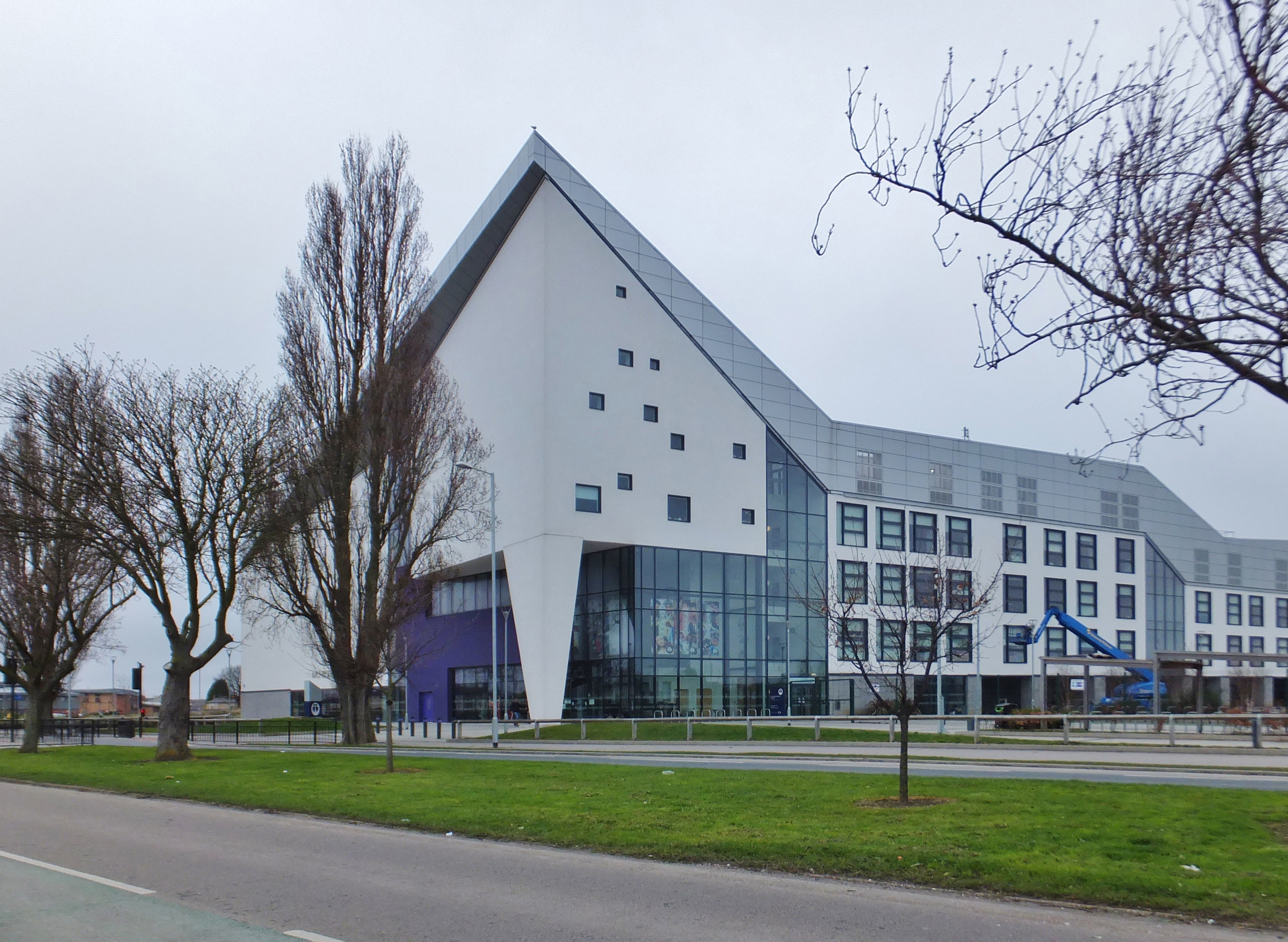
Archbishop Sentamu Academy (2015)

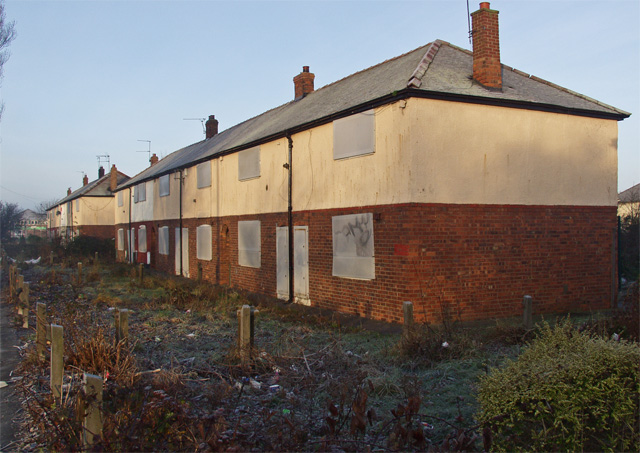
Typical Preston Road Estate housing. Boarded and unoccupied prior to demolition for redevelopment (2007)

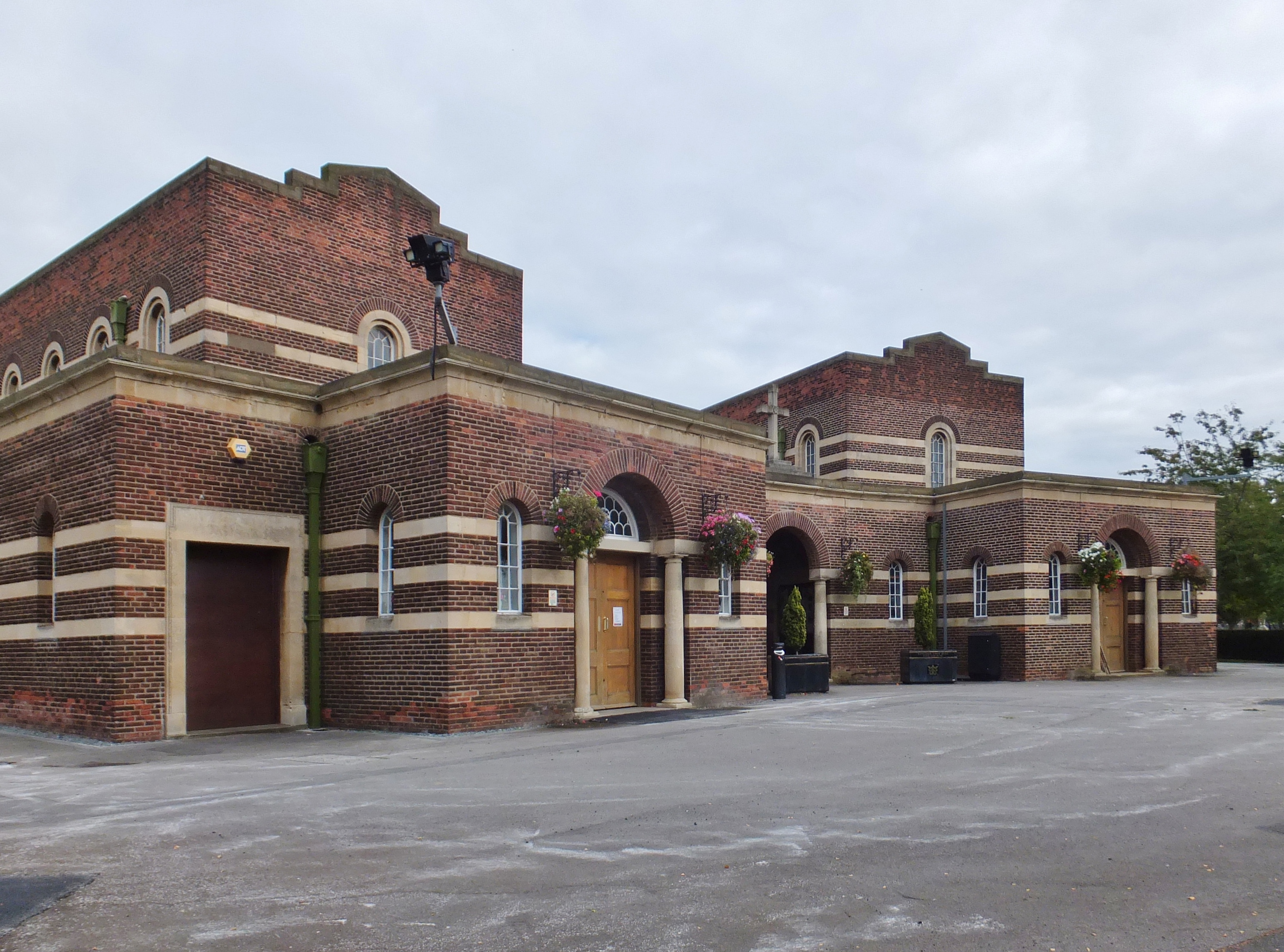
Eastern Cemetery chapel, central building on a symmetrical trapezoidal plan, flanked by two rectangular plan chapels. built 1931 (2014)
