= George Samuel Sewell =

- Born: 26 September 1897; Sunderland
- Died: 5 April 1969 (aged 71); Hull
- Occupation: Engineer
- Awards: George Medal & bar

George Samuel Sewell, GM & Bar (26 September 1897 – 5 April 1969) was one of the first recipients of the George Medal (GM) and was the first civilian to be awarded a bar to the GM.

== Early life ==
Sewell was born on 26 September 1897 in Sunderland, England, and during the First World War joined the Durham Light Infantry. However, as he was underage when he enlisted, he was discharged and instead trained as a marine engineer. After a period in the Merchant Navy, Sewell joined Shell-Mex & BP, and by the outbreak of the Second World War worked at the Shell-Mex plant at Saltend, east of Hull on the Humber Estuary. As well as his engineering duties, he also managed the works fire brigade.

== First award of the George Medal ==
On the afternoon of 1 July 1940, a lone German bomber attacked the oil refinery, dropping a number of high-explosive bombs. Bomb fragments punctured one of the petrol storage tanks and ignited the petroleum gas inside. Along with the plant managers and a number of firemen, Sewell entered the compound with the damaged tank and while the managers transferred gas from other tanks close by, Sewell "led a party of men into the tank compound and was also continually on the tank roof whilst the gas inside was burning, endeavouring to extinguish the flames by playing foam over the tank top and placing sandbags over the roof curb." The actions of these men were successful and the fires extinguished without major damage to the plant. When the George Medal was instituted on 24 September 1940 by King George VI among the first awards made were those to Sewell and four others who took part in the firefighting.

== Second award of the George Medal ==
A little under a year later, on the night of 8/9 May 1941, the refinery was again bombed during a Hull Blitz air raid and a petrol storage tank caught fire after being hit by an incendiary bomb. Again Sewell and his team entered the area, and "although enemy aircraft were overhead and bombs continued to fall, Mr. Sewell immediately climbed to the top of the tank and placed bags of sand over the holes, successfully extinguishing the fires. Mr. Sewell then climbed on to another tank and kicked to the ground a burning bomb. Mr. Sewell's gallant action prevented a serious fire and consequent loss of valuable product and installation."

Later that month, on 27 May 1941, unaware that he was to be awarded a bar for his second commendation, Sewell attended Buckingham Palace for the investiture ceremony for his first medal, returning again on 4 November 1941 for the second ceremony.

== Later life ==
Sewell continued to live and work in Hull before retiring in 1958. He died in 1969.

== Bibliography ==
- Geraghty, Tony (2002). North East Coast Town: Ordeal & Triumph: The Story of Kingston-upon-Hull in the 1939–1945 Great War. Hull Academic Press. ISBN 978-0-946289-45-5.
- Henderson, D. V. (1984). Dragons Can Be Defeated: A Complete Record of the George Medal's Progress, 1940–83. Spink & Son. ISBN 978-0-907605-14-0.
- Sewell, Eric (April 2002). "An Invitation to Buckingham Palace". Soul Search. The Sole Search.
- Sewell, Mike (August 2001). "George Samuel Sewell, A Unique Hero". Soul Search. The Sole Search.
