= Bilton Grange Estate =

Housing estate in Kingston upon Hull, England

Coordinates: 53°46′18″N 0°15′55″W

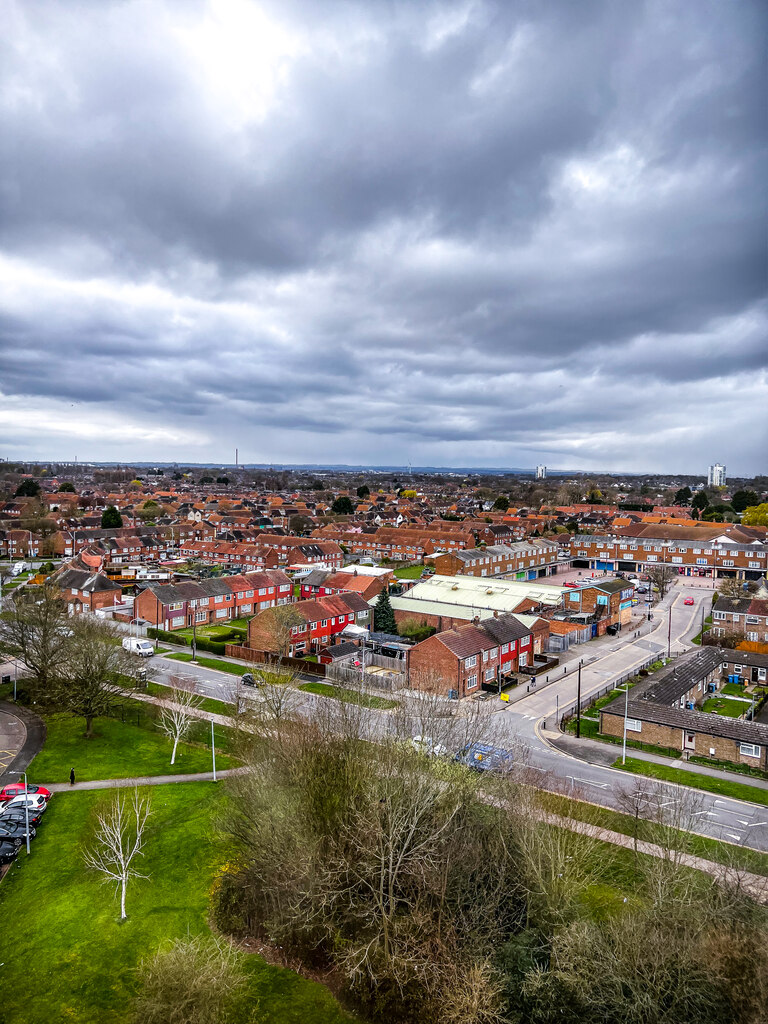
View from St Romanus House

Bilton Grange Estate is in the east of Kingston upon Hull, in the East Riding of Yorkshire, England.

== Description ==
It was mainly built during the 1950s, along with Longhill and Greatfield Estate.

The local primary schools on Bilton Grange are Thanet Primary School, Griffin Primary School and Mountbatten Primary School. The nearest secondary schools to Bilton Grange are The Marvell College, Archbishop Sentamu Academy and Malet Lambert.

Local amenities include Greenwich Avenue shopping centre, The Acorns Family Hub, Bilton Grange Methodist Church, Diadem Medical Practice, East Hull Community Farm and Alderman Kneeshaw Park and Recreation Centre. Bilton Grange Estate is part of the Longhill and Bilton Grange Ward of the local council, and is represented by Karl Turner, Labour MP for East Hull.

== History ==
Following the Second World War during the reconstruction period, the Hull Corporation created several new housing estates in east Hull. First came Bilton Grange Estate, then Longhill, closely followed by the Greatfield Estate. At the time, the houses were in high demand as they had to accommodate an increased number of workers. Many of the houses sported indoor toilets and bathrooms, which at the time were viewed as a luxury that many homes elsewhere in the city did not have.

All the new housing estates were designed by Andrew Rankine, Hull's city architect, as independent units, each with its own shops, schools, libraries and other civic facilities. Their design was in a reduced Festival of Britain style, with pantile roofed brick buildings, built along generally short curving roads with generous common open treed areas.

== People ==
- Reece Shearsmith, actor and comedian attended Andrew Marvell High School.
- Paul Cooke, rugby league player for Hull FC and Hull KR.
- Cosey Fanni Tutti, artist and musician.

== See also ==
- List of areas in Kingston upon Hull
