= Southcoates =

Area of Kingston upon Hull, East Riding of Yorkshire, England

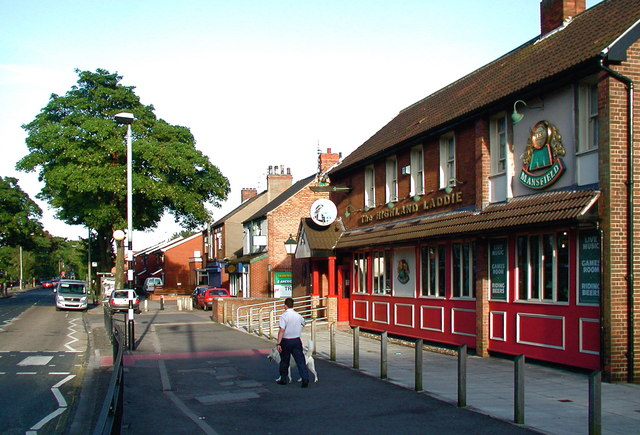
- Southcoates Lane in 2008

- Location within the East Riding of Yorkshire
- OS grid reference: TA 124 304
- Unitary authority: Kingston upon Hull
- Ceremonial county: East Riding of Yorkshire
- Region: Yorkshire and the Humber
- Country: England
- Sovereign state: United Kingdom
- Post town: HULL
- Postcode district: HU9
- Dialling code: 01482
- Police: Humberside
- Fire: Humberside
- Ambulance: Yorkshire

Southcoates is an urban area in the eastern part of Kingston upon Hull, in the ceremonial county of the East Riding of Yorkshire, England.

A named habitation at Southcoates dates to at least the 11th century, (Note: Archaic: Sotecote (11th century), Sottecotes (13th century), Sutkotes (14th century), Sudcotes (16th century)) during the medieval period the place was a small hamlet, associated with Drypool. The urban growth of Hull expanded over Southcoates in the late 19th and early 20th century, and the place subsequently gave its name to council wards.

The area of Southcoates centred on the former village is predominantly urban housing. The southern part of the Southcoates area is adjacent to the Humber Estuary, and was originally wetlands; a large amount of land was reclaimed southwards on the foreshore during the construction of the Alexandra Dock in the 1880s; this land and adjacent areas are in predominantly industrial and dock use.

== Geography ==
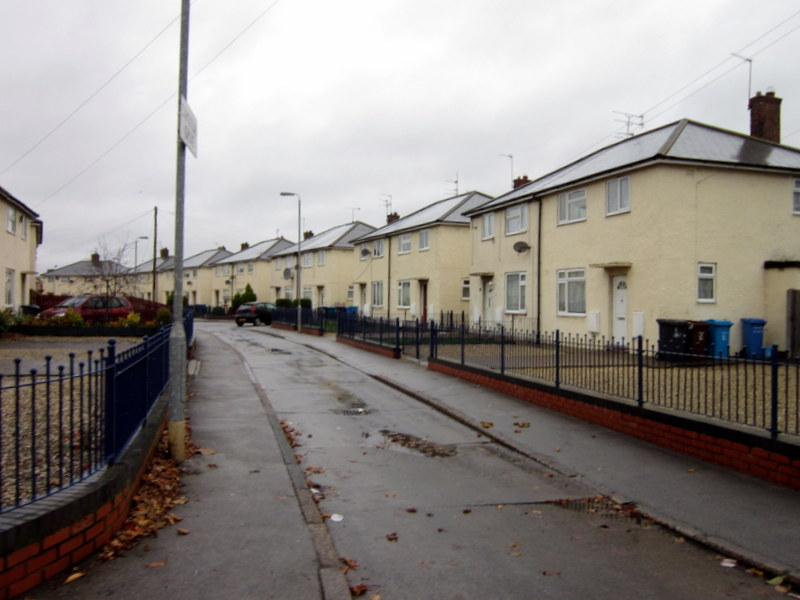
Interwar period housing in Southcoates (2012)

Southcoates is an urban area of Kingston upon Hull. The north-west boundary is roughly formed by the A165 Holderness Road beyond which is the urban area of Summergangs and the public park East Park. The eastern boundary approximates with the Holderness Drain beyond which is Marfleet to the south-east, and the Preston Road area. To the south-west is the Drypool area, and to the south is Alexandra Dock and the associated industrial area along the A63 Hedon Road, which includes Hull Prison and Hedon Road Cemetery.

In the modern era (2012), Southcoates give its name to two Hull City Council wards: Southcoates West, and Southcoates East. Formerly (1998) a single area "Southcoates (ward)" was used by the Office for National Statistics, for statistical purposes. Following a review, in 2017, by the Local Government Boundary Commission the number of councillors in Kingston upon Hull was reduced to 57 from 21 wards, effective from the 2018 elections, and restored a single Southcoates ward.

== History ==
=== 1066–1700 ===
Southcoates, (Note: 53.75810°N 0.29409°W, Southcoates (hamlet)) in mentioned in the 11th-century Domesday Book as Sotecote, both in association with Drypool, According to A.H. Smith the name Southcoates may derive from an old Norse name Soti and cote (cottage), meaning "Soti's Cottage".

The manor of Southcoates, which included land at Drypool was held by the Suttons during the 13th and 14th centuries until Thomas de Sutton (d.1389), after which it passed to a succession of heirs; in 1415 the manor was split in three. Ownership of the manor became increasing fragmented through the remainder of the medieval period, and up to enclosure in the mid-1700s.

There was a chapel at Southcoates, with right of chantry established in around 1236.

At the time of the Domesday survey the land at Southcoates was described as 'waste'. In the medieval period Southcoates was farmed on the open field system, with three fields (East, West and Humber field), plus additional wetlands south of the village known as the South Ings (see Ings), additionally there was some land reclaimed from the Humber, known as the Growths (or Groves). The fields were used for arable farming, and later for pasture.

In the early 14th century a road from Drypool (north-east) to Bilton Bridge via Summergangs was improved, and connected to 'Sutkotes' via a junction at a wayside cross. (Note: The road is roughly the route of the modern Holderness Road (A165), and may have connected near the place on the road called Mile House. See Ingram 1959, p. 16)

=== 1700–1860 ===
Adult population in Southcoates was in the low tens during the late medieval period to the 1700s. The fields at Southcoates were enclosed in 1764.

By 1801 population had reached 201, in c. 1831 the population of the township was 1,114 in 226 houses, (Samuel Lewis give a figure of 798) which rose to 1,673 in 1851. By the 1850s Drypool had become urbanised, and development was spreading along the Holderness Road; however Southcoates was still a small hamlet in an essentially rural environment.

After 1847 the Sutton, Southcoates, and Drypool Gas Company began to supply the area with gas from a works. In 1853 the Victoria Dock Branch Line opened with a circular route from Paragon station to Victoria Dock – Southcoates railway station was built on the line, (Note: 53.75151°N 0.31619°W, Southcoates railway station (original)) but was over a mile south-west of the hamlet; the Hull and Holderness Railway which connected to the Victoria Dock branch, opened 1854, and ran approximately half a mile south of Southcoates, roughly parallel to the Humber towards Marfleet and Hedon.

A small cemetery "Drypool and Southcoates Cemetery" was opened in the 1850s for the parish of Drypool. (Note: 53.74816°N 0.30212°W, Drypool and Southcoates Cemetery) The sacristy of the cemetery was used for religious services from 1877 (St Nathaniel, after 1885 as St Bartholomew), and later (1891) replaced with a tin tabernacle type church (demolished 1929). (Note: 53.747904°N 0.302191°W St Nathaniel's, later St Bartholemew's, in the former Drypool and Southcoates Cemetery on Hedon Road cemetery.)

In a will and codicils of 1713 and 1717 Eleanor Scott had left 37 acres (15 ha) of land to be used charitably or the poor of Southcoates. A school and school house were built 1855/6 funded by the charity.

=== 1860–1945 ===
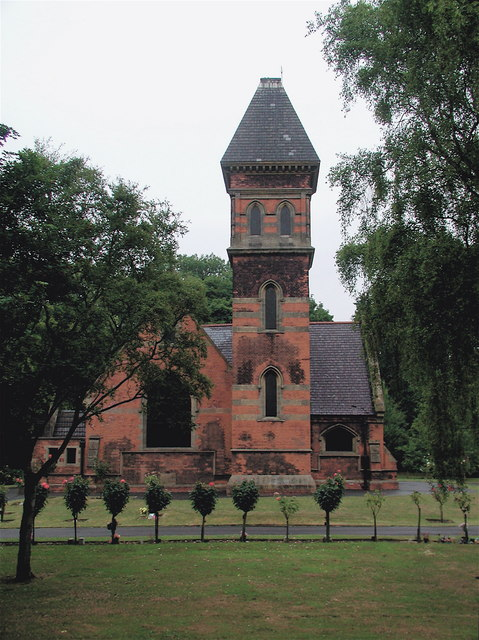
Hedon Road Cemetery crematorium (2006)

In 1865 construction began of a new prison on Hedon Road on a 12 acres (4.9 ha) site, (Note: 53.74859°N 0.29675°W, Hull Prison) replacing an earlier one at Kingston Street. In 1873 the Hull General Cemetery Company acquired 27 acres (11 ha) of land on Hedon Road for the purposes of a cemetery (Hedon Road Cemetery); (Note: 53.74864°N 0.29429°W, Hedon Road Cemetery) This was expanded by further 8 acres (3.2 ha) in 1894, and a crematorium built. (Note: 53.75128°N 0.28892°W, Hedon Road Cemetery extension and Crematorium) The cemetery was full by 1960, and the crematorium disused c. 1963. In the 1880s the Alexandra Dock was built to the south of the village on the foreshore of the Humber Estuary, (Note: 53.74479°N 0.29664°W, Alexandra Dock) extending into the Humber by reclaiming land. Also in the 1880s the Drypool and Marfleet Steam Tramways Company constructed a tramway along Hedon Road, with their main depot at Hotham Street. (Note: 53.74871°N 0.30617°W, Drypool and Marfleet Steam Tramways depot) The tramway was later acquired by Hull Corporation Trams and converted to electric power running in 1903.

By the 1880s "South Ings"; the area south of the Hull and Holderness railway line, and north of the new dock was beginning to be developed; Lee Smith Street was already in existence in 1850, and by 1880 had been built upon (initially named "New Town"), including a Wesleyan chapel (1866, from 1910 Lutheran), (Note: 53.74818°N 0.30043°W, Lee Smith Street Wesleyan chapel (site of)) a Primitive Methodist chapel (1877, replaced 1894), (Note: 53.74815°N 0.30016°W, Hedon Road Primitive Methodist chapel (site of) the Cemetery, Prison and Sanatorium had also been established. Additionally housing around Crowle Street had been developed. The City Hospital or City Sanitorium (infectious diseases) was built c. 1885 on Hedon Road, (Note: 53.75017°N 0.28742°W, City Hospital (later Maternity Hospital), Hedon Road (site of)) near the Holderness drain.

Southcoates was formerly a township in the parish of Drypool, in 1866 Southcoates became a separate civil parish, on 25 March 1898 the parish was abolished and merged with Sculcoates. In 1891 the parish had a population of 22,551.

A new depot for electric trams had been established on Hedon Road by 1903. (Note: 53.74835°N 0.2887°W, Hedon Road tram depot) By 1910 most of the land between the railway line and Hedon Road was built upon, land development was practically complete by the 1930s with the construction of the three storey flat development at Newtown Square. An additional railway line running roughly parallel to the Withernsea Line was built c. 1912 for access to the new King George Dock, and the Withernsea Line track layout modified. The crossing of Southcoates Lane and the railway lines to was converted into a road flyover by the 1920s.

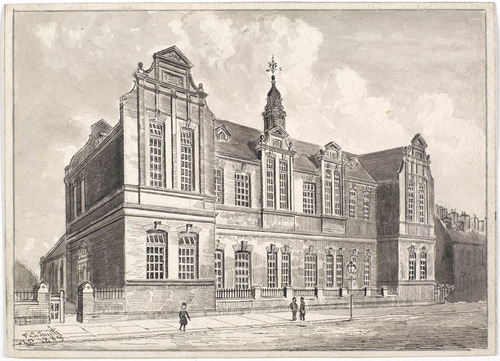
Crowle Street Board School (F. S. Smith, c. 1889)

The urban growth of Hull continued in the late 19th and 20th century; in 1897 the area of Southcoates became a ward of the expanding Kingston upon Hull. Crowle Street School was first established in 1884 (796 places) and expanded to over 1,000 places in 1897. (Note: 53.74916°N 0.30543°W, Crowle Street School (site of)) Estcourt Street School was established in 1902 with another 1,000 places.

By 1910 building development along Holderness Road extended beyond Southcoates, and expansion from Drypool was approaching the village from the south-west; by the 1930s housing development had reached the village, with building along to roads connecting the former hamlet to Holderness Road (South Coates Lane and Avenue), additionally a new housing estate was being development adjacent to the east and a canister works had been established to the south-east of the former village centre. (Note: 53.75655°N 0.29155°W, Canister works) By the late 1930s housing development extended beyond the former village north-eastwards, with only a few areas undeveloped, and a second large container factory had been established by the end of the first half of the 20th century. (Note: 53.75447°N 0.29190°W, Barrel works)

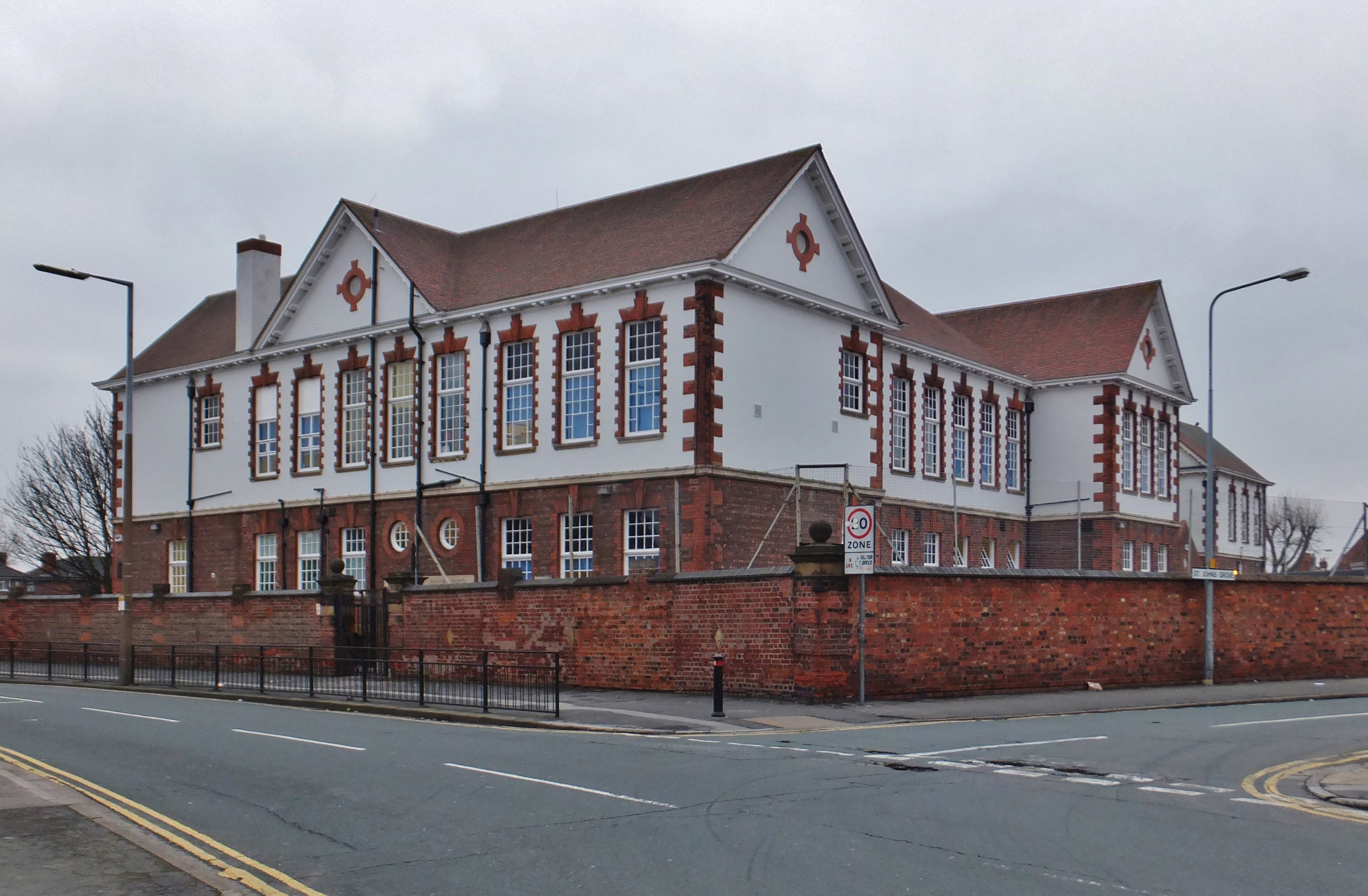
Southcoates Lane School (2014)

New schools were established in the area during the growth on population: Southcoates Lane School opened 1912 with places for 700 boys and girls, plus 640 juniors and infants; (Note: 53.75728°N 0.29317°W, Southcoates Lane School) and Sacred Heart (Roman Catholic) Junior and Infant School opened 1932 (300 places). (Note: 53.75704°N 0.29604°W, Sacred Heart RC School) A fire station was built on Southcoates Lane c. 1932. (Note: 53.75593°N 0.29392°W, Fire station)

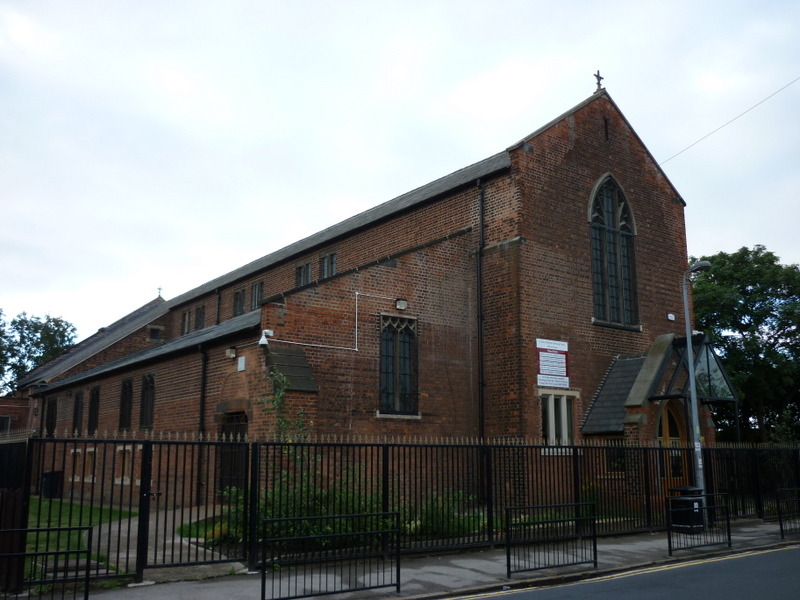
St John's church (2010)

Other secular, charitable and religious establishments in the first half of the 20th century included: Four almshouses built c. 1907 funded by Eleanor Scott's Charity, with a further three houses were built in the 1930s. A temporary church (Rosmead Street) opened in 1919, but burnt down in 1923; and a permanent replacement 'St John the Evangelist' built 1925, damaged during the Hull Blitz (1941) and reopened in after repairs (1952). (Note: 53.753030°N 0.299369°W St John the Evangelist, Rosmead Street) (Note: Parts of Southcoates are within the ecclesiastical parish of Drypool, for more detail on that parish, see Drypool.) The Catholic 'Church of the Sacred Heart' was established on Southcoates Lane in 1929, (Note: 53.75760°N 0.29556°W, Sacred Heart RC church) and the Sisters of Mercy Catholic religious order moved to a new convent on Southcoates Lane, built in 1931. (Note: 53.75704°N 0.29948°W, Sisters of Mercy convent)

The 'City Hospital' moved to Cottingham in 1929 (see Castle Hill Hospital), and the old Hedon Road hospital was repurposed as a maternity hospital. A cinema, the 'Royalty', was built on Southcoates Lane in 1935. (Note: 53.75741°N 0.29659°W, "Royalty" cinema) (Note: See also Closed cinemas in Kingston upon Hull.)

The area was heavily bombed during the Hull Blitz, in part due to the docks and dockside industries being a primary target for Luftwaffe bombing raids. At Rustenberg Street bombing caused what are thought to be the first deaths in Hull in August 1940. Alexandra Dock was targeted on 15/16 April 1941 with bombs also falling on Hotham Street causing deaths. The Rustenberg Street area was hit by bombs again on 18 July 1941 resulting in several deaths. A raid on 1 August 1942 targeted Alexandra Dock, resulting in deaths in the surrounding area including Southcoates; a 4,000-pound (1,800 kg) bomb fell on Grindell Street killing 23. A raid on 14 July 1943 targeted the railway system – both Southcoates Lane bridge and nearby signal box were hit, Both Estcourt Street School, and the Methodist Chapel (Hedon Road) were destroyed during the bombing. (Note: Estcourt High was re-established in the north-east corner of the Preston Road Estate (near the future Bilton Grange Estate) on Hopewell Road in 1945.) The Prison was also badly damaged by bombing.

=== Modern (1945–present) ===
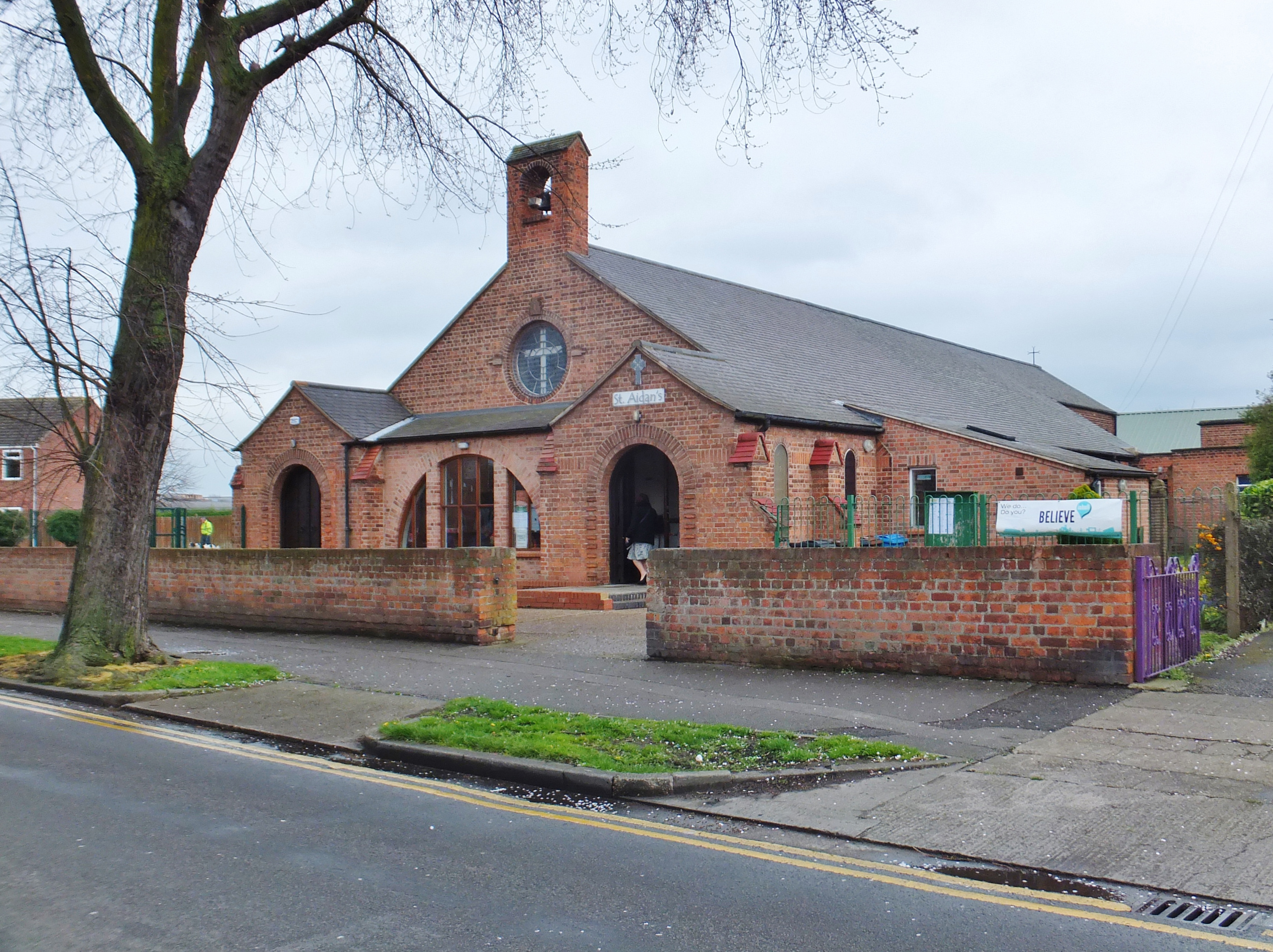
St Aidans church (2014)

Excluding some minor infill housing developments in the late 1940s the pattern and scope of housing development in Southcoates remained essentially unchanged in the second half of the 20th century. Estcourt Street Infant School, (Note: 53.75290°N 0.30671°W, Estcourt Street School) and Alderman Cogan High School, (Note: 53.76139°N 0.29376°W, Alderman Cogan High) were opened in 1954 and 1957 respectively. In 1955 St Aidan's church was consecrated. (Note: 53.75989°N 0.29385°W, St Aidan's church) In 1957 a new chapel for the Primitive Methodists was built in Southcoates Lane, (Note: 53.75343°N 0.2954°W, Southcoates Lane Methodist church (site of)) to replace the Hedon Road chapel which had been destroyed by bombing in 1941. In 1960 the site of the former Drypool and Southcoates cemetery and chapel was converted into a public garden. A new secondary school 'David Lister', began construction in 1963. (Note: 53.75430°N 0.30146°W, David Lister School)

In 1976 a serious three-day riot took place at Hull Prison.

Southcoates Lane School was given listed building status in 1994. Crowle Street School was demolished 1996. Hedon Road maternity hospital closed in 2003, and was demolished. and David Lister School closed at the end of the 2012 academic year, having been scheduled for early closure and replacement under the Building Schools for the Future programme.

In 2016 a 162 home residential development was given planning permission for the former barrel works site.

== See also ==
- List of areas in Kingston upon Hull
- Listed buildings in Kingston upon Hull (Southcoates East Ward)
- Listed buildings in Kingston upon Hull (Southcoates West Ward)
