= Joseph Walter West =

Joseph Walter West (born Sculcoates, Yorkshire 3 May 1860; died Northwood, London, 27 June 1933), also known as J. Walter West or Walter West, was an artist, lithographer and designer of bookplates.

West was the son of Alfred West, a seed crusher and corn dealer, and his wife Sarah Ann West, née Petchell. The family were Quakers. West's first employment was as a cashier with the engineering firm of Priestman Brothers of Hull and, whilst working there, he studied art at Bootham School in York. Having saved a modest amount from his wages, in 1883 he travelled to London to study at St John's Wood Art School, then at the Royal Academy Schools and in Paris at the Académie Julian.

== Artistic career ==
In 1887 West was awarded a silver medal by the Royal Academy for a drawing of a head from life. In 1893 he was elected a Fellow of the Royal Society of British Artists and in 1904 he was elected to the Royal Watercolour Society. He was Vice President of the RWS from 1918 – 1920. Between 1916 and 1931 West designed seven posters for London Underground. He often signed his work with a monogram consisting of a weathervane pointing west and the letters of his surname.

== Personal life ==
In 1892 West married Ada Caroline Wise (1860–1952) with whom he had four daughters, one of whom was the artist Cicely West (1897–1977). He was buried at the Friends Burial Ground at Jordans, Buckinghamshire.
