= Drypool =

Area of Kingston upon Hull, East Riding of Yorkshire, England

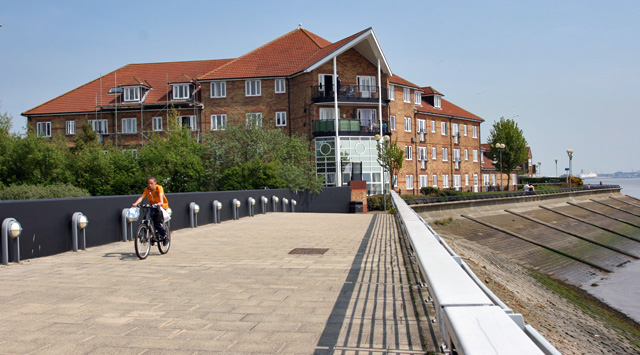
- Housing at Victoria Dock

- Location within the East Riding of Yorkshire
- Population: 12,500
- OS grid reference: TA106286
  - London: 155 mi (249 km) S
- Unitary authority: Kingston upon Hull
- Ceremonial county: East Riding of Yorkshire
- Region: Yorkshire and the Humber
- Country: England
- Sovereign state: United Kingdom
- Post town: HULL
- Postcode district: HU8 & HU9
- Dialling code: 01482
- Police: Humberside
- Fire: Humberside
- Ambulance: Yorkshire
- UK Parliament: Kingston upon Hull East

Drypool (archaic Dripole (Note: Also Dritpole, Dritpol, Dripold, Dripol, Dridpol)) is an area within the city of Kingston upon Hull, in the ceremonial county of the East Riding of Yorkshire, England.

Historically, Drypool was a village, manor, and later a parish on the east bank of the River Hull near the confluence of the Humber Estuary and River Hull; it is now part of the greater urban area of Kingston upon Hull, and gives its name to a local government ward.

Modern Drypool ward is a mixture of light industrial developments and housing, mainly terraced, as well as the post 1980s housing development 'Victoria Dock Village' built on the infilled site of the former Victoria Dock. The area also includes 'The Deep' aquarium, several schools, and a swimming baths.

== Geography ==
=== Drypool ward ===
The local government ward of Drypool (2001) has its north-east border formed by Laburnum Avenue and Chamberlain Road, south-west of East Park, and its western border formed by the River Hull, and its eastern border formed by New Bridge Road, and the eastern limit of the Victoria Dock Village estate (Earle's Road). The population of the ward in 2001 was about 12,500.

The local government ward of Drypool includes the entirely industrial area known as The Groves on Stoneferry Road, a western part of the area of Summergangs including the Garden Village estate and the house and grounds of Holderness House. Also within the ward are the Victoria Dock Village, the area known as Garrison Side including Sammy's Point and The Deep aquarium.

The south-western part of Holderness Road lies in the ward; including the Mount Retail Park (2002), East Hull Baths (1898) and listed James Reckitt Library (1889), and the area known as Witham.

The Drypool Ward includes four primary schools: Buckingham Primary School, Craven Primary School, Mersey Primary School and Victoria Dock Primary School. It also includes much of the catchment area for Westcott Primary School (formerly Archbishop William Temple CoE Primary). The current catchment secondary school is David Lister on Rustenburg Street, but this is due to change to Malet Lambert School on James Reckitt Avenue.

Drypool Ward is an electoral district returning three councillors to Hull City Council. Both Labour and Liberal Democrat party candidates have been elected since 2007 in a roughly two-way split of votes.

=== Drypool Parish ===
The Anglican Parish of Drypool covers a larger area than the council ward, taking in parts of Southcoates West and Holderness Wards, with a catchment population of over 24,000; the parishes regular services take place in the churches of St Columba of Iona, St John the Evangelist, and Victoria Dock Church which (as of 2010) uses Victoria Dock Village Hall for public worship.

In 1891 the civil parish had a population of 8,054. On 25 March 1898 the parish was abolished and merged with Sculcoates.

== History ==
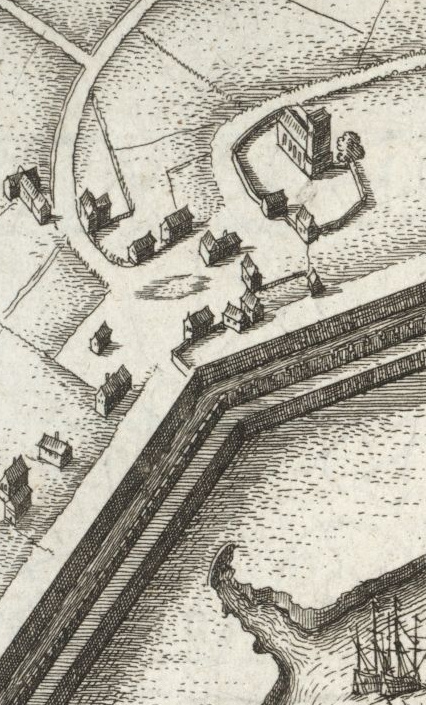
Drypool, with ditch and walls of Hull Castle, c. 1640, from Hollar's map of Hull. (up is roughly east)

The hamlet of Drypool lay on the east bank of the River Hull, roughly opposite the Old Town; it is mentioned in the Domesday Book, where it is said that the two manors of "Sotecote and Dridpol" were worth thirty shillings at the time of Edward the Confessor. Both manors were owned by Drogo de Bevrere, a relative by marriage of William I.

Drypool was a chapelry of the parish of Swine; the region consisted mostly of floodable low-lying land or fen; Drypool, literally meaning "Dried up pool" was one of the areas (along with Southcoates) which was sufficiently raised to be habitable. To the north-east of the hamlet was the area known as Summergangs, a region of Ings only usable in summer. During the early medieval period work was undertaken to improve the land by drainage; in the 13th century Saer de Sutton (Note: Saer de Sutton, was lord of Drypool and Sutton, and had been made custodian of the port of Hull by Henry III.) created a drainage ditch (later known as Summergangs Dike), (Note: Summergangs Dike, later also known as the Lambwath Stream.) and is thought to have diverted the River Hull along a new more easterly route, along the stream known as 'Sayer's Creek'; these waterways, along with the River Wilflete (Note: The Wilflete separated Drypool from Marfleet, its successor is the Holderness Drain.) and the Humber later formed the boundaries of parish of Drypool.

In 1302 a road from Hull to Hedon was made into a King's highway; it which originated at the River Hull, passing through Drypool and then roughly north-eastwards through 'Suttecotes Som'gang' (Summergangs) passing Southcoates at the west side before joining the old Sutton to Hedon road at Bilton; this was later to become Holderness Road (A165).

There were jetties on the river at Drypool, one was removed in 1470, possibly due to silting of the haven, or due to the threat of invasion. There was also a staith for the 'north ferry' across the Hull; it became obsolete after the North Bridge was built as part of Henry VIII's fortifications of Hull.

During the Pilgrimage of Grace (1536) Hull had been taken by the rebels. After the rebellion Henry VIII ordered improvements to the fortifications of the town; these included the construction (1540s) of a castle (Hull Castle) and blockhouses with connecting wall on the Drypool side of the river, as well as a bridge connecting the two banks at a cost of £23,155 17s 5d. After the restoration of Charles II of England the obsolete fortifications on the east bank of the river were extended and improved, at the same time incorporating a garrison into the city which had sided with the Parliamentarians during the Civil War; the new fortress, built in the 1680s, named "The Citadel" was a moated triangular bastioned artillery fortification built in the south-west corner of Drypool; approximately 30 acres (120,000 m^{2}) of land was taken by the new fortification. The area of the citadel became known as Garrison Side, and was an extra-parochial area (1880s).

Drypool fell within the Parish of Swine until the 17th century, when a new parish of Drypool cum Southcoates was created.

By 1821 Drypool had a population of 1409, increased from about 800 in 1811, and about 400 in 1801; by the 1820s the urban growth was such that it had become part of the greater Hull conurbation. Drypool (with the parish of Drypool cum Southcoates) was formally incorporated into Kingston upon Hull in 1837.

By 1849 the Citadel was out of military use, and in 1863–64 the site was sold, and the structure demolished. Victoria Dock had been constructed north-east of the garrison between 1845 and 1850. The Dock company, having acquired the site of the Citadel, began to develop it, laying out streets, a toll bridge connecting to the west bank was also built in 1865 (demolished 1944), known as South Bridge or "Ha'penny Bridge". (Note: 53.740125°N 0.330772°W, South Bridge ("Ha'penny Bridge"), 1864–1944) Building development on the garrison site was limited; by 1890 the site was used primarily for timber storage, with extensive railway sidings.

The area was heavily damaged by bombing during the Hull Blitz of the Second World War. Victoria Dock closed in 1970.

In 1981 the A63 road (Garrison Road section) was constructed through the parish, which included the construction of a new swing bridge over the River Hull, Myton Bridge.

The Victoria Dock site was redeveloped as Victoria Dock Village in the 1990s with about 2,500 houses.

== Architecture ==
=== Churches ===
Anglican

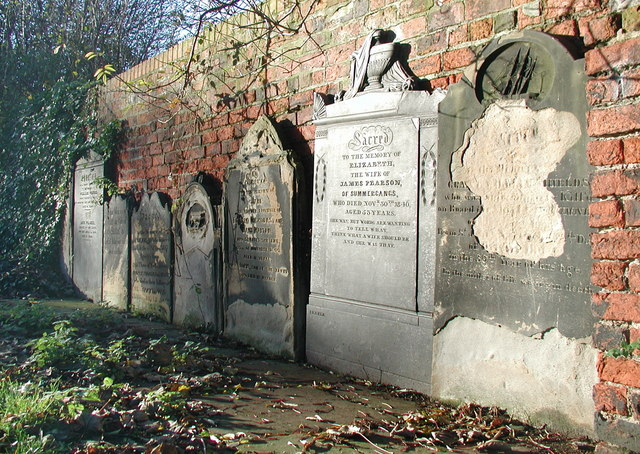
Gravestones, site of the former St Peter's church and graveyard

The Domesday Book does not mention a church in Drypool, though one is shown on a drawing of 1350; some archaeological evidence suggests a date of as early as the 12th century for its construction. The original church of St Peter (Note: Earlier in the 15th century known as St Peter and St Paul.) was demolished in 1822, being in ruinous condition; and with the intention of building a new larger vessel, with over a 1,000 seats, increased from 200. The new church was designed by William Hutchinson and had a four bayed nave incorporating the former church's arches and windows, with a four-storey tower, and was entirely rendered in cement, it was completed in 1823. (Note: 53.744674°N 0.324869°W St Peter's church, on Great Union Street, with Drypool basin of Victoria Dock to the south after the 1850s) The church's chancel was rebuilt in 1867. St Peter's remained in use until 1941 when it was destroyed during the Second World War.

There was briefly a church in the former cemetery on Hedon Road, first called St Nathaniel, later St Bartholemew's; (Note: 53.747904°N 0.302191°W St Nathaniel's, later St Bartholemew's, in the former Drypool and Southcoates Cemetery on Hedon Road cemetery.) it was used to service the growth of population due to the construction, and operation of Alexandra Dock. Initially a sacristy (the mortuary chapel) in the cemetery was used, in 1891 replaced by an iron church of the tin tabernacle type. The church closed and was demolished in 1929; the cemetery was later converted into park gardens by Hull City Corporation.

The church of St Andrew was consecrated in 1878; (Note: 53.751209°N 0.317116°W St Andrew's church, corner of Abbey Street and Holderness Road) designed by architects 'Adams & Kelly' in Geometric Decorated Gothic style of brick with stone; it was built in response to the expansion of the east of the town due to the construction of Victoria Dock, and became the parish church in 1879. The parish church became St Columba in 1961. St Andrews has been demolished.

The church of St Columba in the Garden Village area of Summergangs became the parish church for Drypool in 1961.

On Rosmead Street another temporary church was opened in 1919, but burnt to the ground in 1923. A permanent replacement 'St John the Evangelist' was built 1925, but was bombed in 1941 during the Second World War, after repairs it was reopened in 1952. (Note: 53.753030°N 0.299369°W St John the Evangelist, Rosmead Street)

In The Groves in the parish of Sutton was St Mark's, built in brick with stone facings 1844 in early medieval style. It was bomb damaged during the Second World War and demolished in the late 1950s.

Other denominations

The Roman Catholic church of St Mary's was built in 1890/1891, (Note: 53.750222°N 0.321375°W St Mary's Roman Catholic Church, Wilton Street, south-west end of Holderness Road, Drypool.) supplementing a school with chapel built in 1856. It was demolished in 1982.

The Wesleyan Methodist Holderness Road Methodist Chapel was opened in 1962, replacing the 1877 Brunswick Chapel on the same site, (Note: 53.756184°N 0.31038°W Holderness Road Methodist church.) built to replace a temporary school and church built in 1873 nearby on Durham Street. There was also a church on Lime Street in The Groves built 1826. (Note: 53.75041°N 0.331541°W Lime Street chapel) It was later used as a Sunday School, then by the Methodists, then as a warehouse. Another building on Church Street/Raikes Street corner (Drypool) was built in 1805, used first as Sunday school, and from 1877 (to 1930) as a chapel. (Note: 53.746394°N 0.323775°W Raikes Street / Church Street Wesleyan chapel) Both were superseded by Kingston Chapel, (Note: 53.748718°N 0.323098°W Kingston Chapel, Witham (Holderness Road)) built in a Greek architectural style with an Ionic portico. It opened in 1841, with about 2,000 seats. The chapel was damaged in 1941 by bombing, and later demolished.

An independent church on Holborn Street (Witham) was built in 1830, (Note: Football Association founder Ebenezer Cobb Morley was baptised at Holborn Street in 1831.) (Note: 53.748516°N 0.324546°W Holborn Street Chapel, Witham) after 1860 it was used by the Primitive Methodists. It closed in 1954. (Note: The structure is still extant, the building is in commercial use (2011).) The primitive Methodists also had chapels at Hodgson Street (The Groves), (Note: 53.74976°N 0.32733°W Hodgson Street chapel.) built 1884, closed 1940; (Note: The chapel suffered bomb damage during the Second World War, and was sold in the 1940s, it was part of a factory in 1964. The structure still exists in the first decade of the 21st century.) also at Bright Street (Holderness Road), (Note: 53.750156°N 0.319625°W Bright Street / Holderness Road chapel) an Italianate style red and white brick building with over 1,000 seats opened 1864, it was bomb damaged in 1941, and demolished 1964; and at the Bethesda Chapel, Holland Street (Holderness Road), (Note: 53.754884°N 0.311197°W Bethesda Chapel, Holland Street (Holderness Road)) built 1902, closed 1962; and the Henry Hodge Memorial Chapel in Williamson Street, built 1873 and closed 1940. (Note: 53.747349°N 0.317187°W Henry Hodge Memorial Chapel, Williamson Street, demolished after the 1990s for housing development)

The Congregationalist Latimer Church in Williamson Street, (Note: 53.747806°N 0.318630°W Latimer Church, Williamson Street) was built in 1875 in red and white brick in gothic style. In 1923 it was taken over by the Port of Hull Society for the Religious Instruction of Seamen. (Note: Image Smith, Frederick Schultz. "Latimer church, Williamson Street 1889". hullcc.gov.uk. Hull Maritime Museum, Hull City Museums Collections.) The Salvation Army built a Citadel in Franklin Street in 1970, closed in 2006 and converted to housing. (Note: 53.750246°N 0.318209°W Franklin Street Citadel, Salvation Army)

A Presbyterian church in the Gothic Revival style was built in 1874 on Holderness Road, it was bomb damaged in 1941, and was demolished in 1972 (part of the adjacent Sunday School remains). (Note: 53.749457°N 0.319949°W Presbyterian Sunday School and church.) There is a modern Evangelical Presbyterian church on Holderness Road.

=== Other structures ===
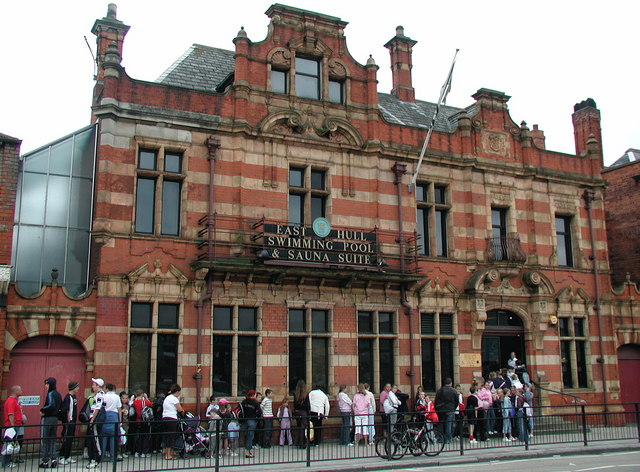
East Hull Baths (2006)

The East Hull Baths (Holderness Road) opened in 1898, and are adjacent to the James Reckitt Library. The building is of red brick with ashlar banding and decoration, the interior includes Art Nouveau tiled decorations. (Note: 53.750323°N 0.318693°W East Hull Baths, James Reckitt Library immediately adjacent to the south-west) The building remained in use as council run public baths until April 2018 when it closed, with swimming facilities transferring to the nearby Woodford Leisure Centre which had been renovated.

The James Reckitt Public Library (Holderness Road) opened in 1889 adjacent to the East Hull Baths to serve the east of Hull. It was Hull's first free library and was established by James Reckitt with more than 8,000 books. The library was donated to the borough of Hull in 1892 when the city adopted the Public Libraries Act. The building, designed by Albert Gelder was built of red brick with some ashlar window and banding features in a gothic revival style, a pyramidal tower roof was lost due to bomb damage during the Second World War, the remainder of the building is a listed structure. The library closed in 2006.

The striking building housing the Deep public aquarium is situated at Sammy's Point, at the confluence of the River Hull and the Humber Estuary. It was designed by Sir Terry Farrell, and construction completed in 2001.

== Notable people ==
- John Venn (1834–1923), logician and inventor of the Venn Diagram, was born in Drypool, son of Rev. Henry Venn, Rector of Drypool
- William Wilberforce MP, the famous anti-slavery campaigner was patron of Drypool Parish
- Isaac Reckitt founded Reckitt & Sons in Dansom Lane, Drypool in 1840, selling starch.
- David Whitfield (1925–1980), a popular British male tenor vocalist born, raised and lived in Drypool, he began his love affair with singing as a choir boy at St Peter's Church.

== See also ==
- Bridges on the River Hull, North Bridge and its ancestors, Drypool, Myton, South and other bridges cross the River Hull into Drypool
- Drypool and Marfleet Steam Tramways Company, early Hull tramway company
- The Garden Village, Kingston upon Hull, model village housing development to the north.
- List of areas in Kingston upon Hull
- Listed buildings in Kingston upon Hull (Drypool Ward)
