= Longhill, Kingston upon Hull =

Residential suburb in the city of Kingston upon Hull

Coordinates: 53.7794°N 0.2665°W

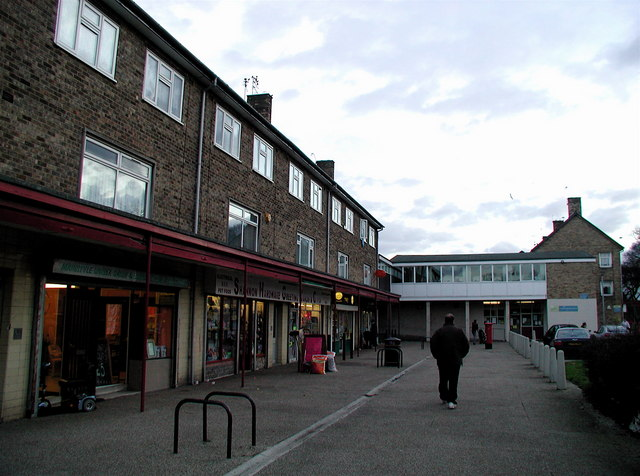
Local shops on Longhill

Longhill is in the north-east of Kingston upon Hull, in the East Riding of Yorkshire, England. It was mainly built during the 1950s, along with Bilton Grange Estate and Greatfield Estate.

On Longhill, there are plenty of facilities for all ages, including a recreational centre known as Eastmount. The local primary schools on Longhill are: Longhill Primary School and Wansbeck Primary School. The nearest secondary schools to Longhill are: The Marvell College, Archbishop Sentamu Academy, Malet Lambert and Winifred Holtby Academy.

Longhill is part of the Longhill and Bilton Grange Ward of the local council, and is represented by Karl Turner, Labour MP for East Hull. Local bus services are provided by East Yorkshire Motor Services - routes 56 and 57.

== History ==
In the reconstruction period after the Second World War the Hull Corporation created several new housing estates in east Hull. These were Longhill, Bilton Grange Estate and the Greatfield Estate . All were designed by Andrew Rankine, Hull's city architect, as independent units, each with its own shops, schools, libraries and other civic facilities. Their design was in a reduced Festival of Britain style, with pantile roofed brick buildings, built along generally short curving roads with generous common open treed areas.

== People ==
- Reece Shearsmith, Actor and Comedian was raised on the estate.

== See also ==
- List of areas in Kingston upon Hull
