= Sculcoates =

Suburb of Kingston upon Hull, England

Coordinates: 53.7608°N 0.339°W

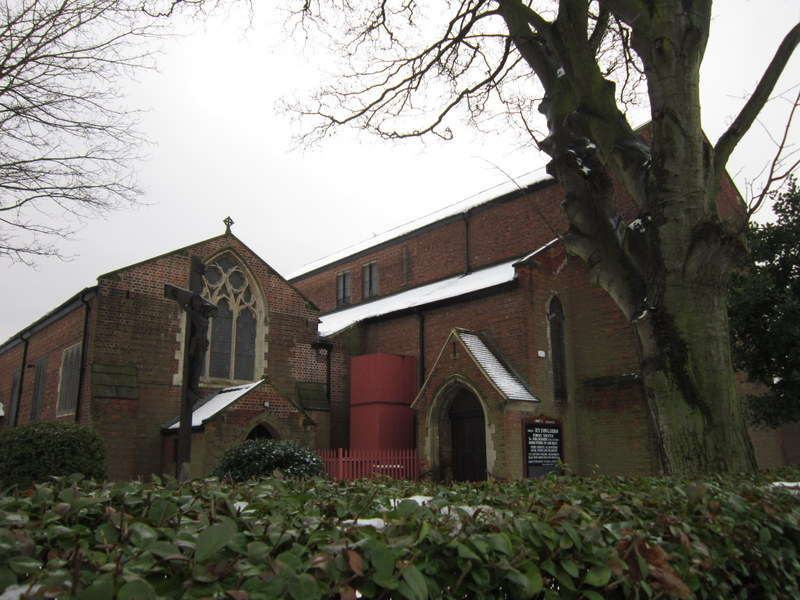

- Location within the East Riding of Yorkshire
- OS grid reference: TA094306
- Unitary authority: Kingston upon Hull
- Ceremonial county: East Riding of Yorkshire
- Region: Yorkshire and the Humber
- Country: England
- Sovereign state: United Kingdom
- Post town: HULL
- Postcode district: HU5
- Dialling code: 01482

Sculcoates is a suburb of Kingston upon Hull, north of the city centre, in the East Riding of Yorkshire, England.

== History ==
Because of increased mobility of an increasing population, the parishes of Drypool, Garrison Side, Hessle Within, Marfleet, Newington, Southcoates and Sutton Within were abolished on 25 March 1898 and added to the parish of Sculcoates. In 1951 the parish had a population of 255,961. On 1 April 1974 the parish was abolished and became part of Kingston upon Hull unparished area.

For many centuries, much of what was called Hull came within the parish of St Mary's Church.

Sculcoates railway station closed on 9 June 1912.

In 2026, alternative rock group, Strange Pink released a song titled, Sculcoates dedicated to the area, and to the rehearsal space, Gorilla Studios which is situated on Sculcoates Lane.

== Amenities ==
Sculcoates has a library, a post office, a high school, two primary schools and a swimming bath called Beverley Road Baths. The baths was opened in 1905, and underwent a £3.75 million refurbishment from June 2020 until reopening in August 2021. The baths are a Grade II Listed building.

== Notable people ==
- Cameron Earl British automotive engineer
- Dorothy Mackaill – actress (1903–1990)
- Joseph Walter West (1860–1933), artist, lithographer and designer of bookplates
