= Fenner (company) =

British-based manufacturer of industrial belting

- Type: Subsidiary
- Industry: Polymers
- Founded: 1861; 165 years ago
- Headquarters: Hessle, England, UK
- Revenue: £655.4 million (2017)
- Operating income: £59.1 million (2017)
- Net income: £34.3 million (2017)
- Number of employees: 4,330 (2017)
- Parent: Michelin
- Website: www.fenner.com

Fenner is a leading British-based manufacturer of industrial belting and other polymer-based products. It is headquartered in Hessle. It was listed on the London Stock Exchange until it was acquired by Michelin in May 2018.

== History ==
The business was founded by Joseph Henry Fenner in 1861 as a manufacturer of leather belting at Bishop Lane in Hull, England. In 1921 it diversified into textile belting and subsequently into polymer belting. In 2006 the Company initiated a major expansion in Ohio, United States.

In March 2018, French tyre maker, Michelin, launched a bid to buy the company for £1.3 billion. The acquisition was completed in May 2018.

== Operations ==
The business is organised into the following units:

- Engineered Conveyor Solutions
- Advanced Engineered Products
