= Liberty Academy =

Academy in Kingston upon Hull, England

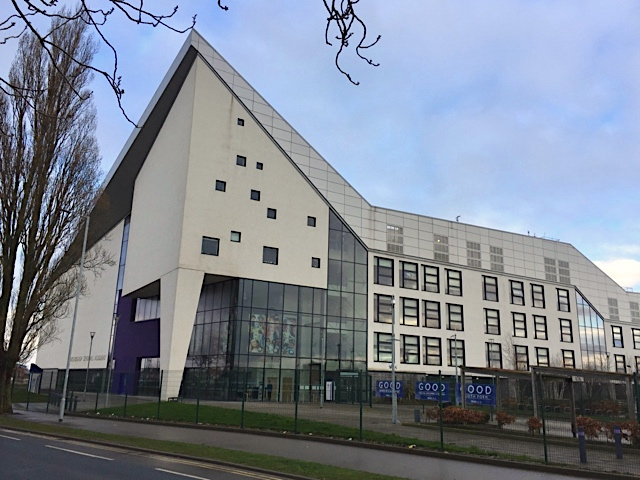
- View from Preston Road

Location
- Preston Road; Preston Road Estate; Kingston upon Hull, East Riding of Yorkshire, HU9 5YB; England
- Coordinates: 53°45′31.2″N 0°16′49.3″W

Information
- Type: Academy
- Religious affiliation: Church Of England
- Local authority: Hull City Council
- Department for Education URN: 135598 Tables
- Ofsted: Reports
- Principal: Louise Beasley
- Gender: Mixed
- Age: 11 to 18
- Enrolment: 1,429 as of February 2016
- Colour: Blue
- Website: www.lib.hlt.academy

Liberty Academy, formerly Archbishop Sentamu Academy, is a mixed Church of England secondary school and sixth form located in the Preston Road Estate of Kingston upon Hull, England. The school used to be named after John Sentamu, who, at the time, was the Archbishop of York.

== History ==
It was first established as Estcourt High School, a technical school for girls before becoming Bilton Grange Senior High School in 1973, a comprehensive mixed school. In 1988 the school became Archbishop Thurstan Church of England Voluntary Controlled School. The school converted to academy status in 2008 and was renamed Archbishop Sentamu Academy. Rebuilding works at the school as part of the Building Schools for the Future programme were completed in 2011.

== Academics ==
Liberty Academy offers GCSEs and BTECs as programmes of study for pupils.

== Notable former pupils ==
- Liam Mower, actor and dancer
