= Marfleet =

Area in Kingston upon Hull, England

Coordinates: 53.7512°N 0.2636°W

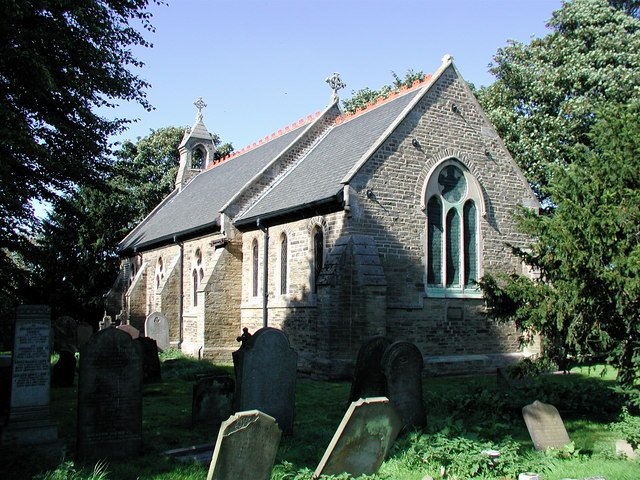

- Location within the East Riding of Yorkshire
- OS grid reference: TA144297
- Unitary authority: Kingston upon Hull
- Ceremonial county: East Riding of Yorkshire
- Region: Yorkshire and the Humber
- Country: England
- Sovereign state: United Kingdom
- Post town: HULL
- Postcode district: HU9
- Dialling code: 01482
- UK Parliament: Hull East

Marfleet is an area of Kingston upon Hull, East Riding of Yorkshire, England, in the east of the city, near King George Dock.

Marfleet was until the late 20th century a small village outside the urban area of Hull – developments including the Hull and Holderness Turnpike (1833), the Hull and Holderness Railway (1854) and the King George Dock (1914), as well as establishments of factories in the area from the late 19th century onwards (notably one by H. H. Fenner & Co., c. 1893) caused the development of the area into an industrial suburb. Parts of the former village, including the church still exist, isolated within the predominately industrial landscape.

== Geography ==
Modern Marfleet is an area within the built up area of Kingston upon Hull on the eastern side of the River Hull – it consists of remnants of the former village, including the historic church, surrounded mainly by industrial buildings and port-side warehousing. Approximate boundaries can be represented by the Holderness Drain to the west; the Old Fleet Drain to the east; and the trackbed (now cyclepath) of the former Hull and Holderness Railway to the north; to the south is King George Dock and the Humber Estuary.

The A1033 Hull to Hedon road passes directly east–west through the area, and the dock end of the Hull Docks Branch railway reaches King George Dock. Marfleet Avenue runs northwards from the A1033, and to the east the original route of Marfleet Lane passes the old village centre. To the west is Alexandra Dock and the area known as Southcoates, beyond which is Drypool; to the north is the urban area of Preston Road and its associated estate, and to the north-east the Greatfield housing estate; to the far east is Salt End and its chemical works. Marfleet is located on low-lying ground – the area is all below 5 metres (16 ft) above sea level.

Marfleet Ward contains the village as well as part of Southcoates south of the Hull Docks branch, as well as large parts of the Preston Road and Greatfield Estate – it extends as far east as the Old Fleet Drain. The ward's population in 2011 was 13,633.

=== Marfleet village ===
The former village has an 'island' like character in the industrial setting is now surrounded – the village was designated as a conservation area in 1994. Older buildings surviving in the area include "The Grange" (18th century farmhouse); cottages and buildings associated with a former brickyard (pre-1850); St Gile's church (1883–84); the Primary School (1892); the Vicarage (1908); and the Church Institute (1914).

== History ==
The village is a small place, chiefly of scattered farm houses, [...] A large old farm-house, with a rookery attached, and a small chapel are the only things worth noticing.

— Poulson 1841, p. 322

Marfleet was mentioned in the Domesday Survey, as Mereflet, part of the manor of Mappleton. The etymology of the name is thought to refer to a "pool stream" – the area is low lying and likely to flood, with several drains or streams in the area outfalling onto the Humber.

A church at Marfleet dates to at least the early 13th century. It was rebuilt in 1793, repaired 1875, and rebuilt again in 1883–4. Marfleet began a separate parish from Paull by the 18th century.

Land around Marfleet was enclosed by the Marfleet in Holderness Inclosure Act 1763 (3 Geo. 3. c. 30 Pr.) Taxes were levied during the medieval period for upkeep of drains and a sluice – work on the outlet of the modern Holderness Drain at Marfleet began 1832.

A direct turnpike road between Hull and Hedon was established by an act of Parliament, and opened 1833 (the turnpike trust discontinued in 1881).

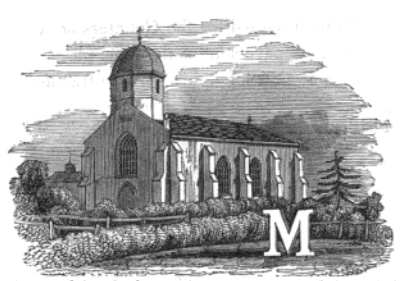
Historiated initial "M" of Marfleet church from Poulson 1841

The church in the 1840s was a slated roofed brick building with buttresses, with a wooden cupola at the western end.

A twelve sided turf maze of the Chartes type once existed in the area, known as the Walls of Troy, near the Humber banks, it was destroyed sometime in the mid 19th century. Other lost features include two non-conformist chapels (19th century), a manor house (in existence in the late 18th century).

In 1854 the Hull and Holderness Railway and its Marfleet railway station opened. In the mid 19th century Marfleet consisted of a few farms; the railway station; a Wesleyan Methodist chapel; the church (St Peter's) and its parsonage; and an inn, the Wheelwright's Arms (later Marfleet New Inn) on the Hull and Hedon Trust turnpike road – at this time the road was 500 feet (150 m) or less from the Humber Estuary itself. The village was well outside the urban spread of Hull, with approaching 2 miles (3.2 km) of enclosed fields between it and the furthest extend of urban Hull at Drypool. Marfleet Lane ran roughly north–south through the village, connecting to the turnpike, with the short Church Lane running east to the church; Back Lane also connected to the turnpike west of Marfleet Lane branching from Marfleet Lane near the station; the only other road was Poorhouse Lane, which branched north-east from Church Lane.

In 1891 the civil parish had a population of 235. On 25 March 1898 the parish was abolished and merged with Sculcoates.

The turnpike trust was discontinued in 1881, and Marfleet became part of the borough of Hull (Hullshire) in 1882. In 1885 the Drypool and Marfleet Steam Tramways Company was formed with the aim of operating steam tram service from Drypool terminating at Marfleet – the company was acquired by the Hull Corporation in 1899, and by the early 1900s an electric tram service was running along Hedon Road to Marfleet.

The situation was little changed by the first decade of the 20th century – a leather works (Providence Leather Works) had been established by H. H. Fenner & Co., (built c. 1893, the company also built some housing for workers) and a railway line branching from the Holderness line for a new dock had been built west of the village; the Hull Joint Dock Act 1906 was passed allowing the construction of a new large dock east of Alexandra Dock jointly by the North Eastern Railway and the Hull and Barnsley Railway – this was opened as the King George Dock in 1914. The works had included reclamation of land at the Humber foreshore, extended the river frontage much further south, essentially to the line of earlier low water mark on the Humber Bank, colinear with the 1880s Alexandra Dock development.

Following the construction of the new dock there was extensive development around Marfleet, including extensive railway sidings for the dock; there was also new housing around Frodsham Street and Ceylon Street, west and south of the village; additionally Back Lane had been straightened or widened, and renamed Marfleet Avenue; other developments included a brickworks, church institute, school, and other factory works.

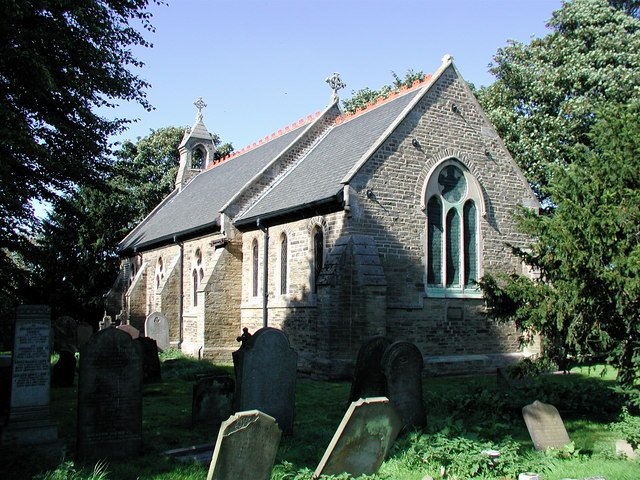
St Giles church, 1883-4 (2006)

A Jewish cemetery had been established off Delhi Street in 1858. The site was extended northwards in 1903. In 1923 another Jewish cemetery was established directly south of the Anglican church. The current church of Saint Giles was built 1884 to the design of J. T. Webster. It is of stone in an Early English style, with a slate roof. The church became a listed building in 1994, together with its churchyard wall and gate. Marfleet Primary School was established by the school board in 1892.

During the Second World War the area, specifically the docks, was bombed during the Hull Blitz – Fenner's factory was destroyed in 1941, and rebuilding began 1947.

By 1950 and more housing had been built – on Marfleet Avenue, and along Hedon Road (the former turnpike) – most of the development had taken place to the south-west of the church; to the east the landscape was still essentially rural. To the north-west the urban spread of Hull had encroached on the village – Preston Road and its associated estate had begun development in the 1920s east of Southcoates – by 1938 the new estate had reached the north-western side of the Holderness railway line, and a new straight section of Marfleet Lane had been built connecting Preston Road to Marfleet Avenue via a flyover bridge crossing the railway.

Prefab housing was built along Hedon Road east of Marfleet after the Second World War. In the decade after the end of that war several large factories were established to the east, north of Hedon Road, including a typewriter works (Imperial Typewriters, est.1954, closed c. 1975); a Cod Liver Oil factory (British Cod Liver Oil Producers Ltd., later Seven Seas, est.1935, closed c. 2015); and, to the far east, adjacent west of the Old Fleet an Engineering works (Priestmans, est. c. 1958, closed c. 1985) and Humbrol (est. 1947, closed 2006).

In 1961 Fenners opened a new research facility, and in 1971 added a new factory for conveyor belts.

Marfleet railway station closed to passengers in 1964, and for all services in 1972. As of 2014 the station house is a private house, and some of the station's platforms are still extant along the current cycle path.

The pattern of industrial and warehousing usage east of the village continued up to the end of the 20th century, with some further infill industrial or warehousing development, so that most of the area was in industrial use by 2000.

In 2005 planning permission was granted for an estate of 95 houses between Marfleet Avenue and Lane. (Built as 'Acasta Way'.)

== See also ==
- Listed buildings in Kingston upon Hull (Marfleet Ward)
