= Greatfield Estate, Kingston upon Hull =

Estate in Kingston upon Hull, East Riding of Yorkshire, England

Coordinates: 53.754369°N 0.252868°W

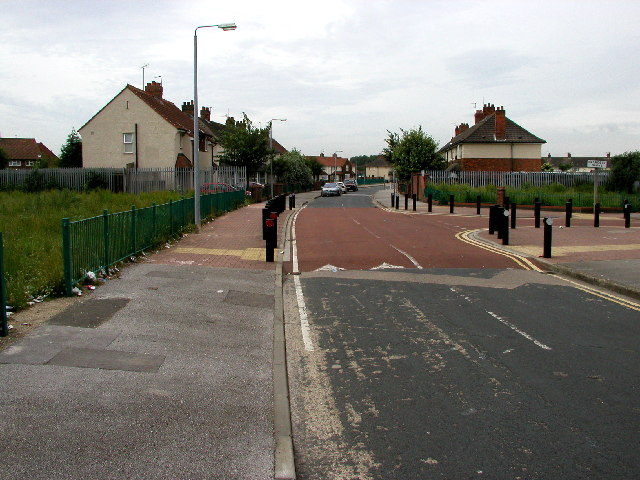
Lingdale Road, Greatfield Estate (2005)

Greatfield Estate is a housing estate in the east of Kingston upon Hull, East Riding of Yorkshire. England, built in the late 1950s.

== Geography ==
Greatfield Estate is in the east half of Kingston upon Hull, close to the eastern boundary of the city, formed by the Old Fleet Drain. To the south it is bounded by the former Hull and Holderness Railway (now a cycle track), beyond which is a portside industrial area, and the King George Dock; to the west is Craven Park rugby ground, and the Preston Road Estate beyond; to the north-west is the Bilton Grange Estate; and to the east is open farmland in the East Riding of Yorkshire – Preston is around 4 miles (6.4 km) to the east. The estate is low-lying, under 5 metres (16 ft) above sea level. Annandale Road is the main road of the estate which bends, coming from the north-west and exiting to the west, connecting with Preston Road.

In 2007 the area was classed as an economically deprived area, with many residents in lower socioeconomic classes – people in the estate are predominately white British ethnically, with 93.1% classed as white.

== History ==
Before the construction of the estate the land at 'Greatfield' was undeveloped; in 1850 it was enclosed drained fields with no roads, and this continued until the estate's construction. The Hull and Holderness Railway which later bounded the estate to the south was constructed in the early 1850s. The Preston Road estate immediately to the west was under development by the 1930s, and the nearby Eastern Cemetery came into use in 1931.

In the reconstruction period after the Second World War the Hull Corporation created several new housing estates in east Hull. These were Bilton Grange Estate, Longhill and the Greatfield Estate. All were designed by Andrew Rankine, Hull's city architect, as independent units, each with its own shops, schools, libraries and other civic facilities. The idea was to create a near-classless village or small town social structure. Their design was in a reduced Festival of Britain style, with pantile roofed brick buildings, built along generally short curving roads with generous common open treed areas. Greatfield estate consisted of 823 houses.

The Greatfield estate was completed in 1960. It included the Anglican church of St Hilda, a subsidiary of the parish of Marfleet. A dedicated library was opened in 1963, and the Roman Catholic St Stephen's church opened in 1966. The estate had three public houses, all Hull Brewery tied houses: the Lord Charles (permanently closed in 2015) on Annandale Road to the rear of the shopping parade; The Falcon, midway along Falkland Road; and The Goat and Compasses (permanently closed in 2019) at the southern end of Falkland Road before the railway line and footbridge.

The estate suffered through lack of employment in the later 20th century, though it is said to have retained community spirit.

In 2015 local events were organised to celebrate 60 years of the estate's existence.

== Schools ==
Primary Education provision.

On its construction, the estate had numerous schools to cater for the post-war baby boom. Primary level education was covered by Ashwell Infants School (intake ages 5 - 7) and Ashwell Junior School (intake ages 8 - 11), both the schools were accessed from Ashwell Avenue and shared different sides of the 'H' shaped building), Oldfleet Infants School (off Bradford Avenue), and Stockwell Infants School (off Dodswell Grove). Changes made by the City Education Committee in the city's educational framework in 1969 saw the two Ashwell Schools on the same site becoming a Junior High School (intake ages 9–13) and being fed by the other two infant schools, due to demographic changes.

Following Local Government Reorganisation in 1974, the new County Council Education Committee responded to further changes to demographics in the 1990–2000 period across the east of the city with Ashwell JHS being closed, and subsequently being demolished in 2009, with the two remaining Infant Schools (Stockwell and Oldfleet) becoming County Primary Schools (intake ages 5–13).

Secondary Education provision.

Greatfield Senior High School was established in 1957 on a tripartite educational system – it consisted of three separate buildings named after halls: Newton Hall, a Technical school (600 places, intake ages 11–16); Elizabethan Hall, a secondary modern (450 places, intake 11–16); and Shakespeare Hall, a Grammar school (450 places). The original three schools occupied a campus ground, the buildings in an 'L' formation next to each other to the west of Greatfield Estate, located south of Preston Road, opposite the Eastern Cemetery, west of the housing estate along Hemswell Avenue, and east of Poorhouse Lane. In 1969 the 11-plus was abandoned across the City and the City Education Committee decided that Newton and Elizabethan Hall were to be merged into a Senior High school (intake ages 13–16), whilst Shakespeare became a new Junior High School (intake ages 9–13).

Local demographic changes saw the then County Education Committee decide that Shakespeare JHS was to be closed in 1988 and soon after the building was demolished, and a new discount supermarket (KwikSave) being built on the former school building site. The new (and current) Craven Park rugby ground was built on the school playing fields to the south of the former Shakespeare JHS site along Poorhouse Lane in the late 1980s, following the rugby club selling off its former ground on Holderness Road to the Co-operative supermarket chain. The Greatfield Senior High School (Newton Hall and Elizabethan Hall) were themselves demolished in the early 2010s, although the gym building was retained as a community facility. In 2014 construction began of a new special alternative provision academy school, "Aspire Academy", on the site of the Isaac Newton school. The school opened 2015.

== People ==
- Mick Ronson, musician; a nearby road was named 'Ronson Close' after his death.
- Lene Lovich, singer, lived on the estate as a teenager.
- Paul Spencer Denman, musician, was raised on the estate.

== Gallery ==
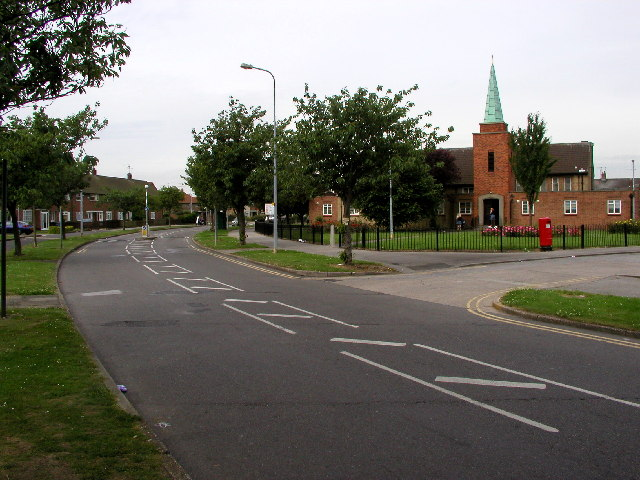
St Hilda's church, Annandale Road. (2005)

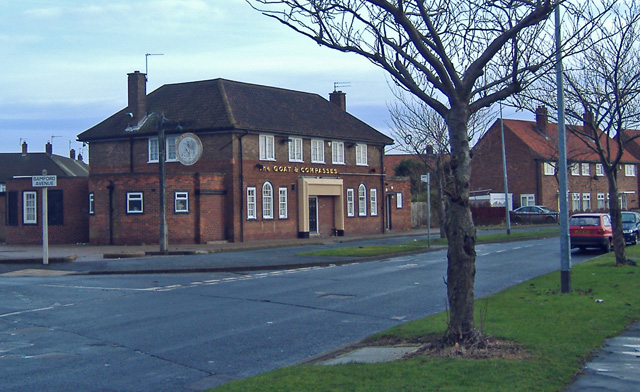
Goat and Compasses pub (2007)

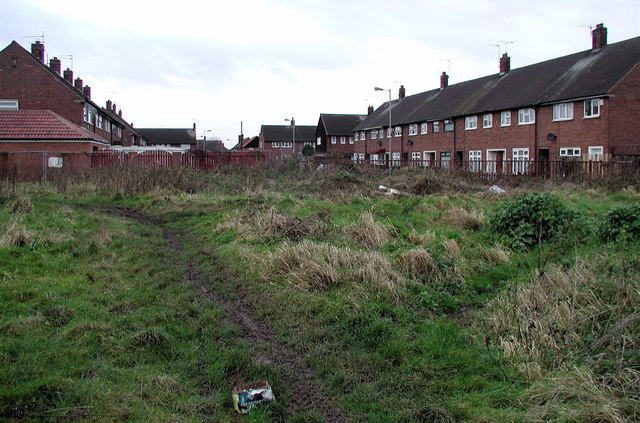
Bamford Avenue viewed from fields (2007)

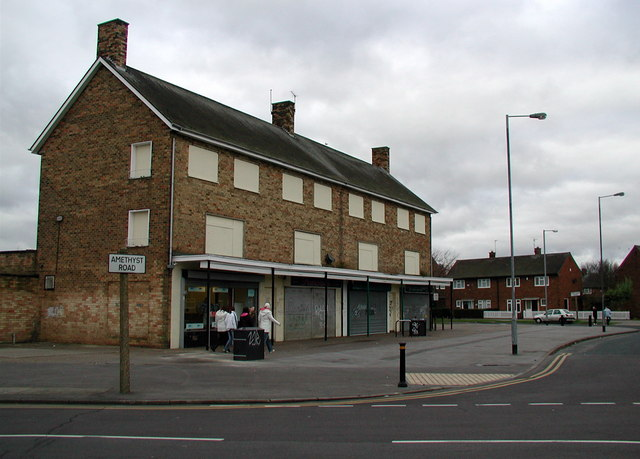
Shops on Amethyst Road. (2007)
