= Hull Blitz =

Aerial bombardment during World War II

- Part of the Strategic bombing campaign of World War II
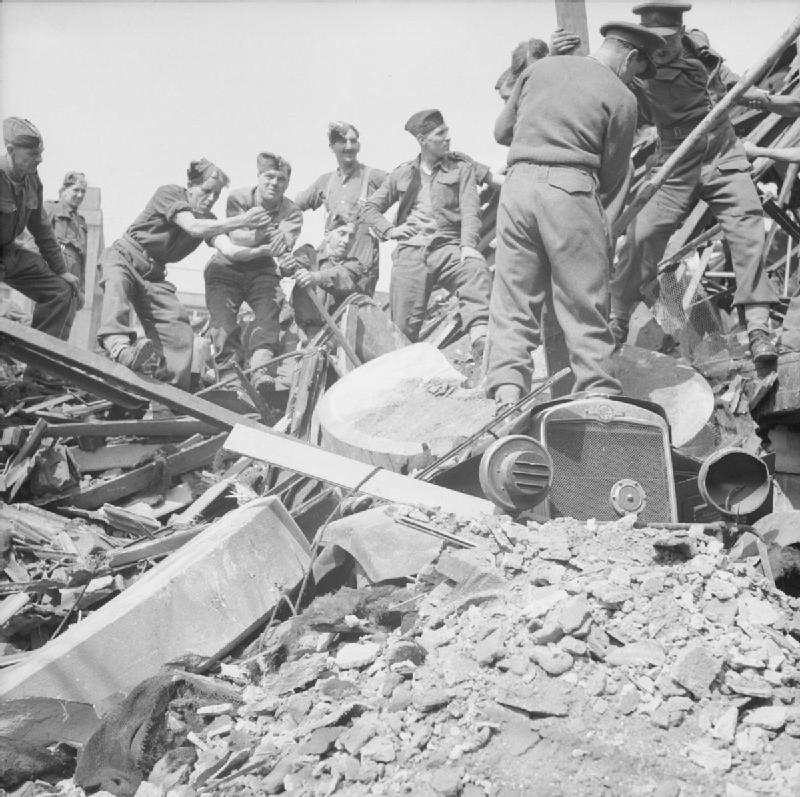
- Troops of 9th Battalion, The Hampshire Regiment, helping to clear bomb damage in Hull.
Date	1940–1942
Location	Kingston upon Hull
Result	Hull damaged by German air raids

Belligerents
Nazi Germany	United Kingdom

Casualties and losses
Unknown	~1,200 dead ~3,000 injured

The Hull Blitz was the bombing campaign that targeted the English port city of Kingston upon Hull by the German Luftwaffe during the Second World War.

Large-scale attacks took place on several nights throughout March 1941, resulting in over 200 deaths. The most concentrated attacks were on the nights of 7/8 and 8/9 May 1941, resulting in just under 400 deaths, and another large-scale attack took place in July 1941 with 143 fatalities.

The city spent more than 1,000 hours under alert during raids from 19 June 1940 to 1945, with almost 1,200 people in the city killed as a result of the bombing.

== Overview ==
Hull was the most severely damaged British city or town during the Second World War, with 95 percent of houses damaged. It was under air raid alert for 1,000 hours. Hull was the target of the first daylight raid of the war and the last piloted air raid on Britain.

Of a population of approximately 320,000 at the beginning of the war, approximately 152,000 were made homeless as a result of bomb destruction or damage. Overall almost 1,200 people were killed and 3,000 injured by air raids.

More than 5,000 houses were destroyed and half of the city centre destroyed. The cost of bomb damage was estimated at £20 million (1952, £501,034,038 as a consumer price equivalent), with 3,000,000 square feet (280,000 m^{2}) of factory space, several oil and flour mills, the Riverside Quay and 27 churches, 14 schools or hospitals, 42 pubs and 8 cinemas ruined; only 6,000 out of 91,000 houses were undamaged at the end of the war. The extent of the damage was similar to that of the Plymouth Blitz.

Despite the damage the port continued to function throughout the war.

We lived in the middle of an industrial area that was a regular target for German bombers .. One night as we were all filing into the air raid shelter Mam dashed back into the house. "Where are you going, Mary", said Dad. "Back for my false teeth", she replied. "Come back here, the Germans are dropping bombs not meat pies", shouted Dad.

— Norman Collier, Comedian, Hull,

== History ==
=== Background ===
During the First World War Hull was bombed several times by Zeppelin airships. An intended raid on London by Zeppelin L9 was diverted to Hull owing to bad weather and on 6/7 June 1915 dropped 13 explosive and 50 incendiary bombs, destroying 40 houses and killing 24, and led to mobs attacking shops belonging to people believed to be of German origin. In this June bombing, a device dropped through the roof of the original Edwin Davis department store on South Churchside, destroying it; Holy Trinity, Hull's central church sited opposite, was miraculously spared. An attempted raid on Hull on 8/9 August 1915 bombed Goole by mistake owing to a navigation error. On 5 March 1916 two Zeppelins L11 and L14 were diverted to Hull from an attack on the fleet at Rosyth. Bombs were dropped on Earles shipyard (Docks) and on Paragon station (city centre) resulting in deaths. The raids showed that Hull was completely unprotected from aerial attack and public anger led to service personnel being mobbed. Further attacks came on 25 September 1917 and 10 March 1918.

A programme of building air raid shelters was instigated in 1938 and more than £1.5 million was spent building 40,000 shelters.

At the beginning of the Second World War, in 1939, ten primary targets had been identified in Hull: three near Stoneferry, the water works, gas works, Sculcoates power station, the oil refinery (Saltend) and the six docks. Additional targets included large grain mills on the River Hull.

=== Chronology ===
==== 1940 ====
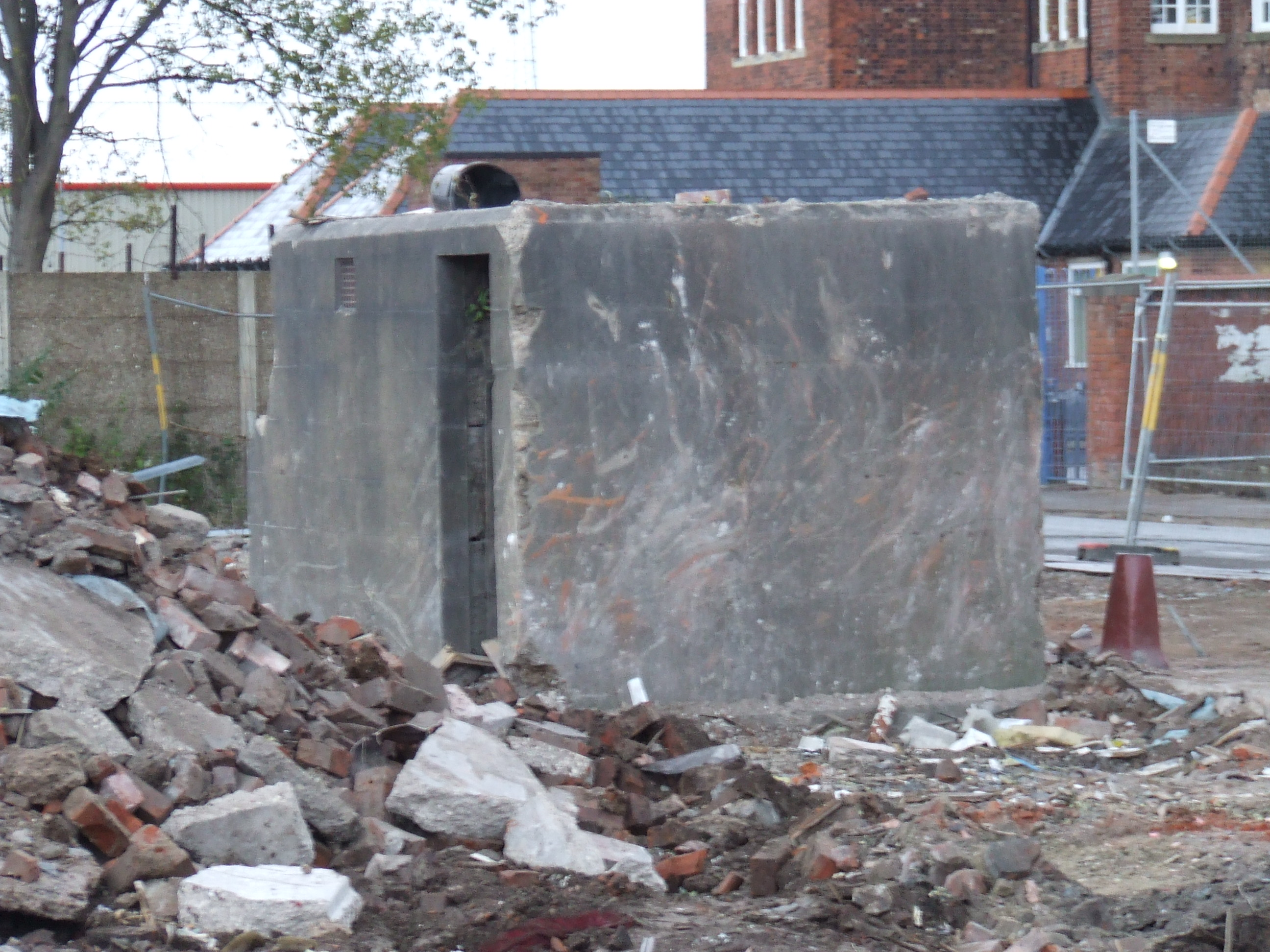
An Air raid shelter in the city seen in 2010

Hull's first air-raid warning was at 02:45 on Monday 4 September 1939 (the day after war was declared): as an 'air-raid yellow' all operational crews were called to their posts. The public siren sounded at 03:20 and the all-clear at 04:08. No raid occurred. The attacks on Hull during 1940 were at a relatively low level and scale, carried out by single or small numbers of planes. The first recorded bombing raid on Hull was during the night of 19/20 June 1940, with minor damage to Chamberlain Street. By the end of the year around 20 raids had taken place and 12 people had been killed by the bombing.

An air raid on the oil depot east of Hull at Saltend caused a serious fire owing to ruptured fuel-storage tanks and five men were honoured with the George Medal for their bravery in containing the fire: two firemen: Jack Owen, and Clifford Turner; and three Saltend workers: George Archibald Howe, George Samuel Sewell, and William Sigsworth.

==== 1941 ====
Bombing intensity increased in the early part of 1941. In February several attacks resulted in multiple casualties, with around 20 people killed. In March major raids took place on the nights of the 13/14, 14/15, and 18/19. The first large attack targeted the River Hull corridor with damage to paint businesses in Stoneferry; the second on St Andrew's Dock, a public shelter in Bean Street nearby was hit by a parachute mine (also known as "naval mines") causing multiple deaths; the third major raid lasted six hours, and resulted in nearly 100 deaths, bombs dropped over a wide area of Hull, concentrated on the River Hull corridor, with many bombs also causing damage west of the river. On 31 March/1 April the city centre was targeted, with predominant use of parachute mines. From the beginning of March to April bombing resulted in 200 deaths.

Attacks continued in April, with a major attack taking place on the 15/16th focused on Alexandra Dock, additionally a parachute mine hit a public shelter resulting in over 4 deaths, further mine attacks took place on the two nights between 25 and 27 April – six people were killed by a mine hitting the Gipsyville estate.

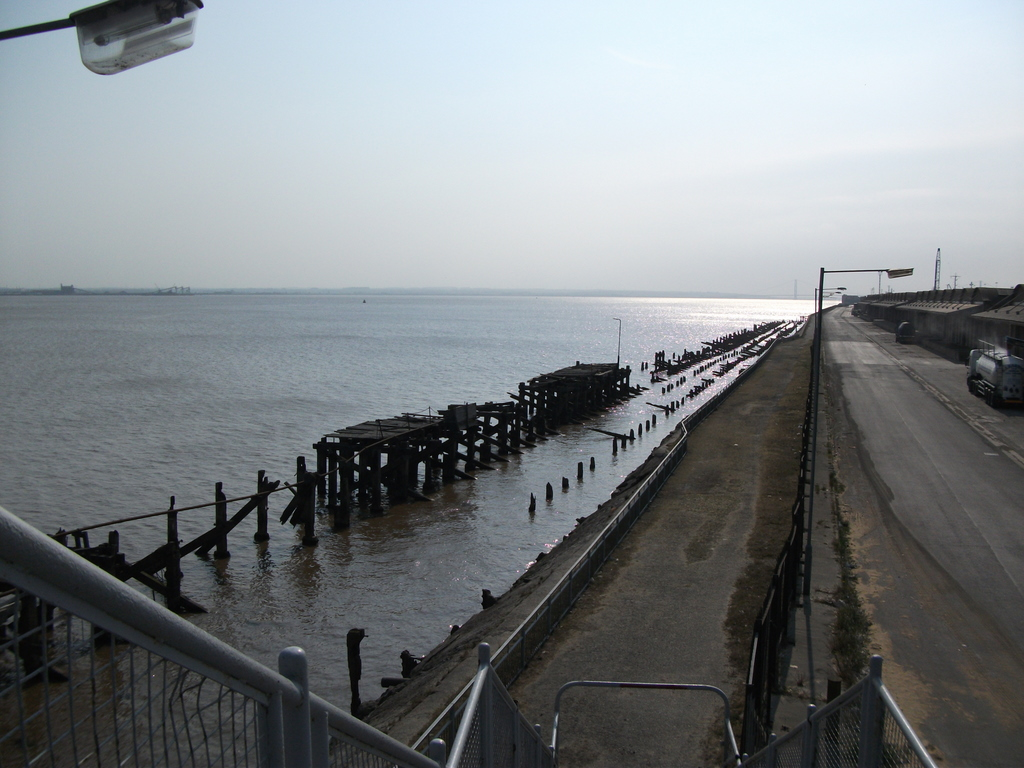
Remains of the burnt out Riverside Quay (2011)

From 3 to 9 May the docks and city centre became the target- these attacks came in the context of Luftwaffe attack on other ports and shipping centres including Merseyside, Belfast, Clydeside and on London before the German invasion of the Soviet Union in June, (see Operation Barbarossa). Two major attacks took place on the nights between 7 and 9 May, each lasting around 5–6 hours, the bombing included high explosives, parachute mines, and extensive use of incendiary bombs. During the attacks many well known buildings were damaged or destroyed including the department stores of Hammonds, Edwin Davis, and Thornton-Varley and other buildings in the commercial centre. On the docks the Riverside Quay was destroyed by fire, and major fires created at timber storage around the Hedon Road area. The Rank Flour Mill was directly damaged, as was the Corporation bus depot, and the buildings of the Hull Corporation telephone system. In addition to the areas of concentration bombs fell on area across the whole town. Over 400 people were killed during the attack, with many casualties due to bombs hitting communal bomb shelters.

The anti-aircraft guns and searchlights of the Humber Gun Zone under 39th Anti-Aircraft Brigade struggled to defend the city against the onslaught, though they and the night fighters from RAF Kirton in Lindsey scored some successes. In one notable engagement on 8/9 May, Gunner Maycock in a searchlight detachment from 40th (Sherwood Foresters) Searchlight Regiment, Royal Artillery, aboard a river barge named Clem, brought down a low-flying Heinkel He 111 bomber with a light machine gun.

After the start of the German campaign in Russia attacks on England diminished as much of the Luftwaffe moved east. Attacks continued sporadically through late May, June and July, with a major attack on east Hull and the Victoria Dock on the night of 18/19 July. Reckitt's (Dansom Lane) and the East Hull gas works were also badly damaged. Around 140 people were killed by the bombing, many from the areas around the works.

The practice of 'trekking', or travelling to the countryside to sleep in the fields when bombing was expected, had begun in the First World War and by 1941 an estimated third of the population were leaving the city at night. In August 1941 King George VI and Queen Elizabeth visited Hull to see the damage.

Minor attacks continued approximately monthly until the end of the year, with serious bombing in the early morning of 18 August and the night of 31 August/1 September.

==== 1942–1945 ====
Attacks were reduced in 1942 compared to 1941, a major bombing raid on 19/20 May targeted Alexandra and Victoria docks and the surrounding area. Also in the Marlborough Avenue and Blenheim Street and Warneford Gardens where 4 people were killed. It is thought the attacks on the docks served the objective of diminishing supplies shipped to Russia. By this stage bomb weight had increased, with 500 kg bombs in common use. On 1 August another raid centred on the eastern docks killed 24 people at Grindell Street when a 1,800 kg bomb was dropped on it. There were attacks in October and December, with comparatively limited damage, each killing two people.

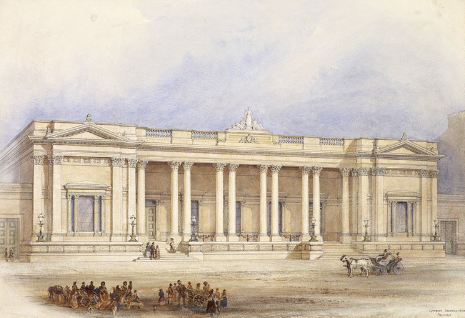
Sketch of a plan for Hull's Royal Institution by architect Cuthbert Brodrick. It was located on Albion Street and destroyed in 1943 during the Blitz

Minor attacks took place on 3 and 15 January 1943, with phosphorus bombs being identified as used as incendiaries in the second attack.

On 24 June a larger-scale attack took place, with the city centre targeted again. During this attack the well-known Hull Municipal Museum was destroyed by fire. The government allowed Hull to be named specifically as the target of the attack and the Hull Daily Mail ran a front-page headline the next day. Another attack took place on 13/14 July, which appears have been intended to damage the railway system and caused more than 20 deaths. Two further attacks later in the year failed to penetrate the city's defences.

No bomb fell on the city in 1944.

In March 1945 the city came under ground attack with cannon shells being fired. There was an attack on 17/18 March, with fragmentation grenades being dropped.

=== East Yorkshire ===
The bombing campaign in Britain resulted in 121 people in the East Riding of Yorkshire being killed – 82 civilians and 39 military deaths. The Luftwaffe targeted coastal towns such as Bridlington, Hornsea and Withernsea, killing a total of 44 people, as well as RAF airfields such as RAF Driffield, RAF Catfoss and RAF Leconfield. An attack on RAF Driffield on 15 August 1940 killed 15 people.

Other attacks on East Yorkshire were on the outskirts of Hull and included the first daylight raid on British soil at the Saltend oil terminal and the attack on the Blackburn Aircraft factory at Brough. Bombs were also dropped in error owing to poor navigation or the Hull Docks decoy. These attacks killed 22 people in Hedon, Bilton and Preston. Other bombing activity was caused by the Luftwaffe dumping bombs after abandoning raids not just on Hull but also on Manchester, Liverpool, Leeds and other northern targets. Death and destruction inflicted by the enemy also included sea mines exploding as they hit the coast and enemy aircraft shooting down allied aircraft over East Yorkshire.

On 24 December 1944 a massed aerial V-1 flying bomb attack was launched on Manchester, one of the bombs impacting prematurely at Willerby, just outside Hull, damaging housing and the Springhead Pumping Station.

=== Evacuees ===
Around 38,000 children were evacuated from Hull. In addition to rural East Yorkshire and Lincolnshire children were evacuated to Lancashire, Norfolk, Northumberland, Leicester and elsewhere. Entire secondary schools were relocated: for example Hymers College had pupils in Pocklington and Market Weighton whilst Newland High School moved to Bridlington and later Malton. However many pupils remained in the city and most evacuees returned from the end of 1942 onwards.

=== Reporting ===
As with many towns and cities, contemporary radio and newspaper reports did not usually identify Hull by name but referred to it as a "north-east coast town," "north-east town," or "northern town" to avoid providing the enemy with tactical information of damage. After the major raids of 18/19 March 1941, 18 July 1941, 18 August 1941 and 24 June 1943 the city was named but in the reporting of the attacks of 7–9 May 1941, the target was referred to by the Air Ministry as being in the Humber area. The Hull Daily Mail referred to victims by name but locations and industrial damage were not. Damage to schools and churches was freely reported and German press releases were quoted verbatim in the British press, including the name of the town.

OUR OBJECTIVE: THE SUPPLY PORT OF HULL The British Port of Hull, with its multi-purpose dockyards, its wharves and its strategically important industrial sites – this was our target yet again today. Along with the other aircrews of our unit, we took off last night, having taken aboard the bomb load which we intended to deposit to good effect in the middle of the great dockyards .. [...]

— Luftwaffe report (19 June 1941, [translation] German Federal Archives)

== Legacy ==
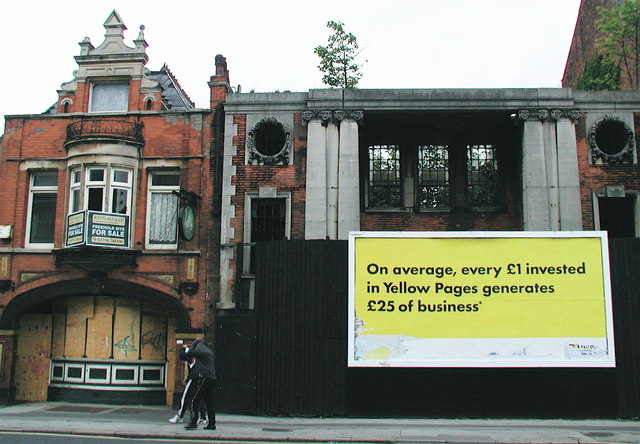
Burnt out National Picture Theatre (right) (2006)

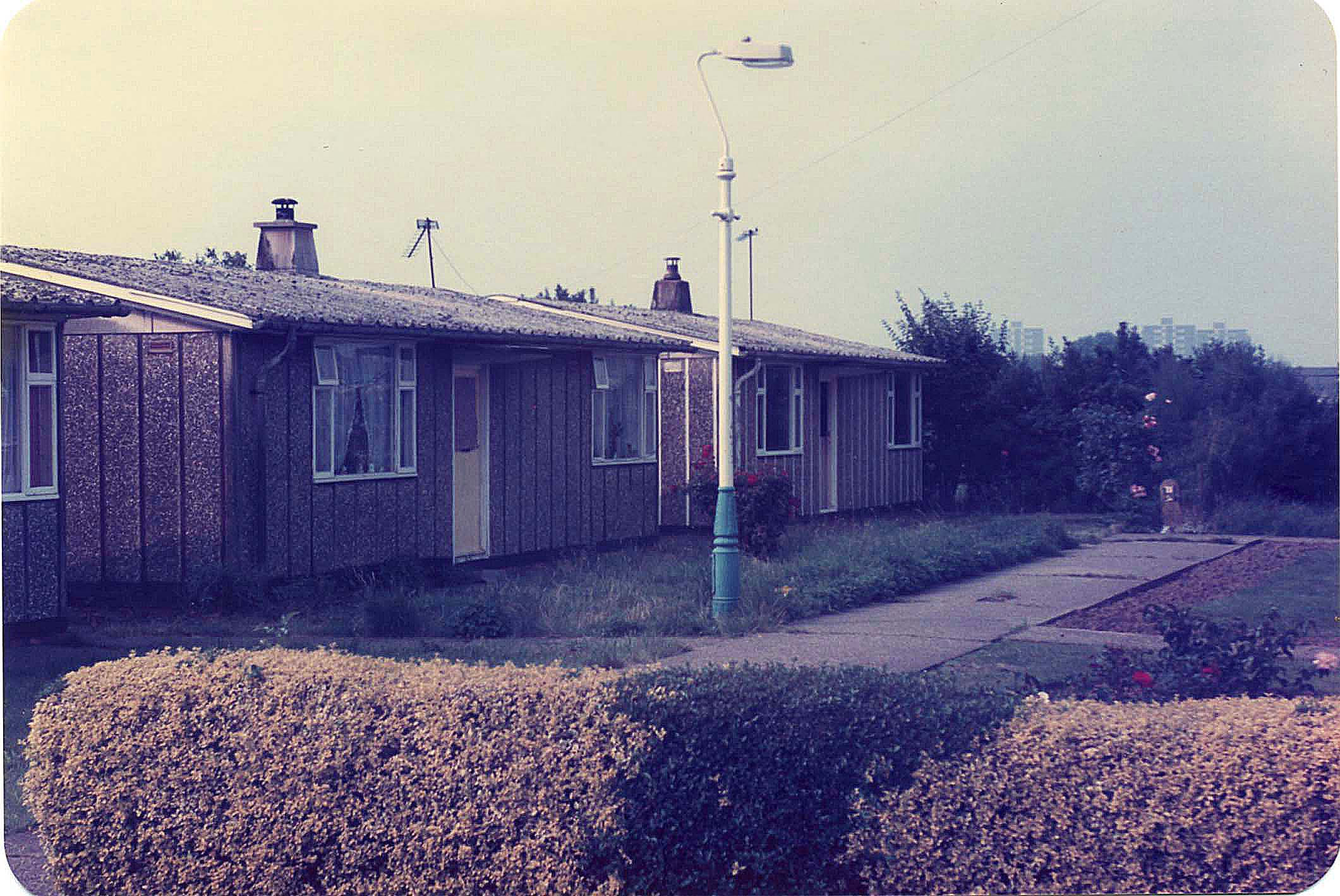
Prefabs like these were built to replace destroyed housing stock (Bilton Grange, 1984)

The city was rebuilt in the post-war period, A grand scheme, the "Abercrombie Plan", was commissioned from Edwin Lutyens and Patrick Abercrombie but not carried out. Several sites remained unredeveloped into the 1980s.

At the site of the Hull Municipal Museum, destroyed by fire during the Blitz, many items of the collection were rediscovered during redevelopment during the 1990s and recovered as part of an archaeological excavation.

The former National Picture Theatre was hit by a parachute landmine (1,600 lb) in 1941, it blew the whole of the back end off the auditorium. The shell of the building remained unredeveloped and undemolished for sixty years, becoming one of the last visible bomb sites in Britain, as a consequence of which the building was listed in 2007.

One oddity of the bombing campaign was the Hull works of the National Radiator Company Ltd.; not a single German bomb fell on the works throughout the entire war despite it occupying a 55 acres (22 ha) site, having been used for munition production during the First World War and having been identified as a Gewehr- und Kleinmunitionsfabrik ("rifle and small munitions factory") on German bombing maps. Captured documents later showed it was the intended target of a raid in April 1941.

The Hull Blitz was also a large part of the light show in Queen Victoria Square, Hull, in January 2017, an event that celebrated the history of the city, as part of Hull UK City of Culture 2017.

== See also ==
- Closed cinemas in Kingston upon Hull
- Strategic bombing during World War II
