= Stepney, Kingston upon Hull =

Area of Kingston upon Hull, England

Coordinates: 53°45′31″N 0°20′57″W

Stepney
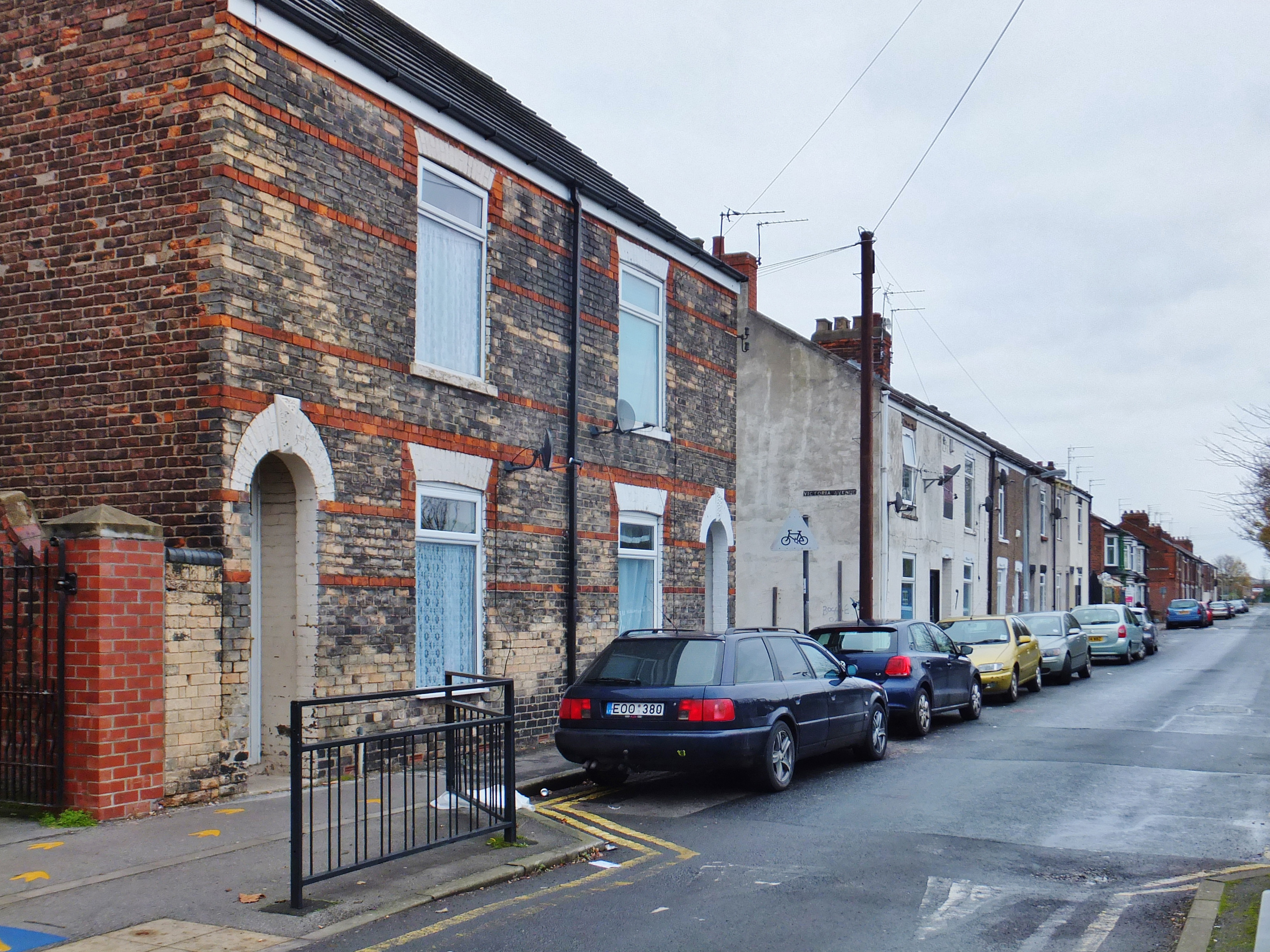
- Stepney Lane, Stepney
- OS grid reference: TA088304
- Unitary authority: Kingston upon Hull
- Ceremonial county: East Riding of Yorkshire
- Region: Yorkshire and the Humber
- Country: England
- Sovereign state: United Kingdom
- Post town: HULL
- Postcode district: HU5
- Dialling code: 01482
- UK Parliament: Kingston upon Hull North

Stepney is an area of Kingston upon Hull within the larger area of Sculcoates, north of the city centre on the (A1079) Beverley-Hull main road. Before the mid-19th century the place was a small hamlet outside the urban area of Kingston upon Hull.

== Geography ==
Modern Stepney is absorbed into the urban sprawl of Hull. The (A1079) Hull to Beverley main road passes directly through the area, with Stepney centred on its junction with Stepney Lane. To the west is Pearson Park; approximate boundaries are formed by Queens Road/Sculcoates Lane to the north; the Beverley and Barmston Drain to the east, beyond which is Wincolmlee (Sculcoates); to the south is further urban development along Beverley Road, leading to the city centre.

Stepney is an urban area, mostly housing, with shopping and services along the main road, and some light industry. The original (pre 1850s) village street survives as a minor kink in Beverley Road, and is indicated by a narrowing of the street, and by a section of more modest two-storey houses.

The area falls within the Beverley Road and Sculcoates areas of Hull.

== History ==
Following the foundation of Hull by Edward I in 1293 proceedings were undertaken to create permanent roads to the neighbouring towns, including one to Beverley; in 1302 a jury decided on the best routes for the roads. The road to Beverley became a turnpike under an act of Parliament of 1744, the Kingston-upon-Hull and Beverley Road Act 1743 (17 Geo. 2. c. 25).

The Beverley and Barmston Drain was authorised by an act of Parliament, the Beverley and Barmston Drainage Act 1798 (38 Geo. 3. c. lxiii), and was the largest of local drains, running roughly north–south about a third of a mile east of Stepney. A bridge on Stepney Lane dating from around 1800 crosses the drain, and is still extant. A smaller drain ran north–south between Barmston Drain and Beverley Road, Cottingham Drain – it was culverted in the latter half of the 20th century and part it now forms a cycle or footpath, other parts built over.

The name "Stepney" is thought to derive from "Stepping Stone" or "Stepstone", from the presence of a mounting block near the place.

An estated house, Stepney Lodge was built in around the end of the 18th century, by 1817 housing had been built along Stepney Lane.

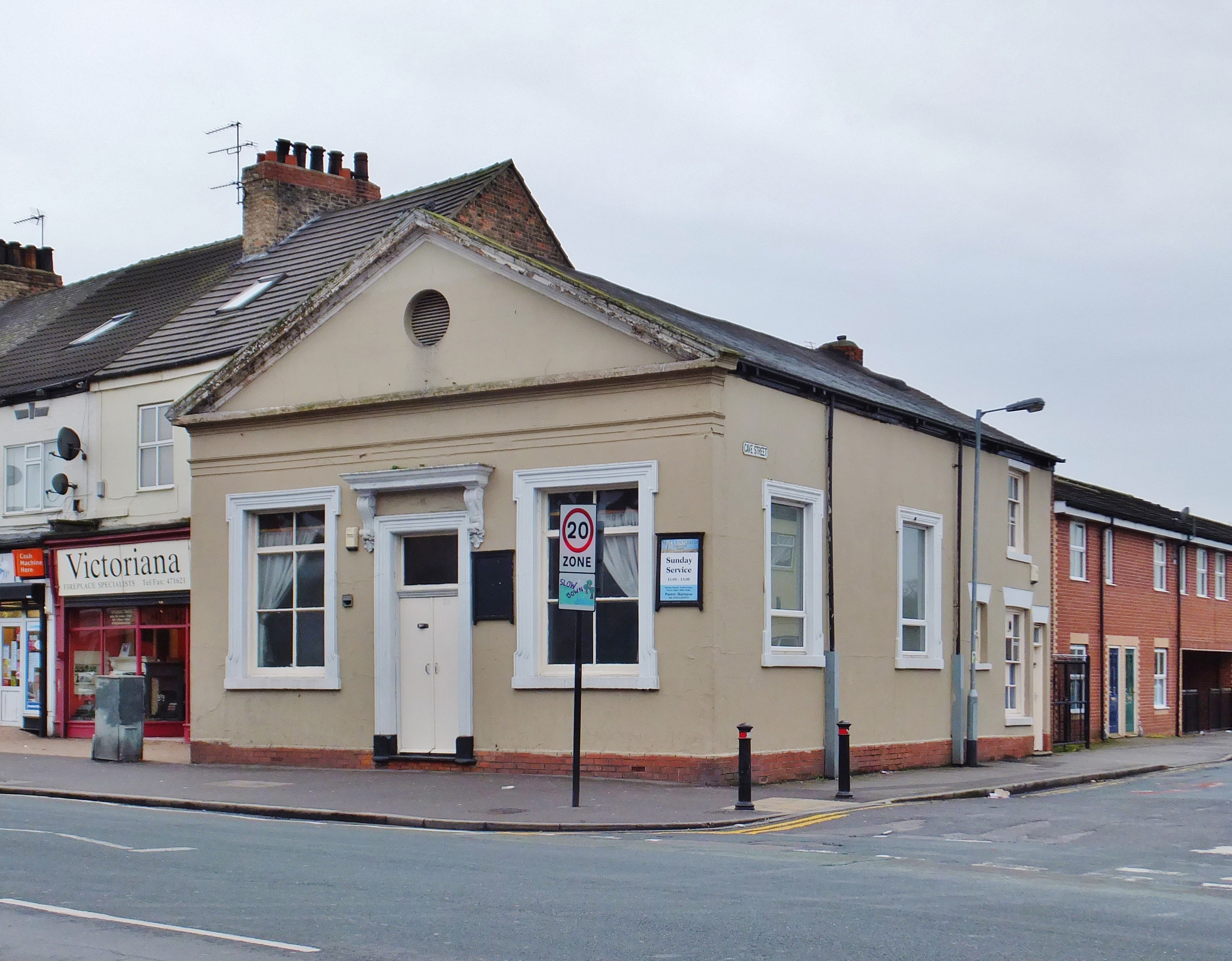
Zion chapel, built 1849 for the Methodist New Connexion (2013)

By the 1850s Stepney included houses along the south side of Stepney Lane; the Bull Inn and Rose Tavern at the junction of Stepney Lane and the Beverley Road; a paper mill, Stepney Mills; (Note: Operating as Smithson & Mayfields of "Stepney Mills" (1866), by 1871 as J.R. & A Mayfield, as A. Mayfield & Sons in 1920, as Mayfield A. & Sons in 1958, as Mayfield & Sons. Ltd. in 1968. The company was wound up in 1966. The site was cleared in the 1980s.) as well as houses "Stepney House" north along Beverley Road, and Stepney Lodge north of Stepney Lane. Zion Chapel (or Stepney chapel) was built in 1849 in a simple classical style with a stuccoed front for the New Connexion Methodists, James Rank (father of Joseph Rank) had a mill in Stepney in the mid-1800s. The mills were initially wind powered. (Note: Sheahan (1864, p. 215) describes a fire (1863) in one of the windmills which is described as having a tower of at least 30 feet (9.1 m) high with five sails, supported on beams 2.5 feet (0.76 m) square and 35 feet (11 m) long. The mill was used for corn and cattle food) In the 1850s and 60s the area was still extensively agricultural, there were vineries at Stepney Lodge, and a large plant nursery was cultivating exotic and other greenhouse plants.

From the 1850s onwards the area around and in Stepney developed substantially: the Victoria Dock Branch Line opened in 1853, on a circular route around Hull, passing through Stepney east-west approximately 600 feet (180 m) south of Stepney Lane. A station, west of the Hull to Beverley road, Stepney station, designed by William Botterill opened at the same time; Pearson Park opened 1862; and in 1869 the 1849 Methodist chapel was replaced by a larger red and white brick Gothic Revival building to the design of W. Hill of Leeds, demolished c. 1982. Some substantial buildings were built along Beverley Road and on the road leading to Pearson Park in the 1860s and 70s, including Dorchester House. By the 1890s the northern urban spread encompassed Stepney, and had gone further north to St John's Wood; the Hull and Barnsley Railway (1885) now passed on the east side along the Barmston Drain; most of the area was now built up with the exception of the grounds of Stepney Lodge north of Stepney Lane, and allotments to the south; there was a small goods yard at Stepney station, and sidings associated with Sculcoates Goods station to the east. (Note: Also known as Temple Street goods yard. In the mid-20th century the site included a goods shed. (OS. 1:2500, 1928, 1950–1, 1960)) Housing on streets off the main road was generally of a more modest scale than the large houses on the main road.

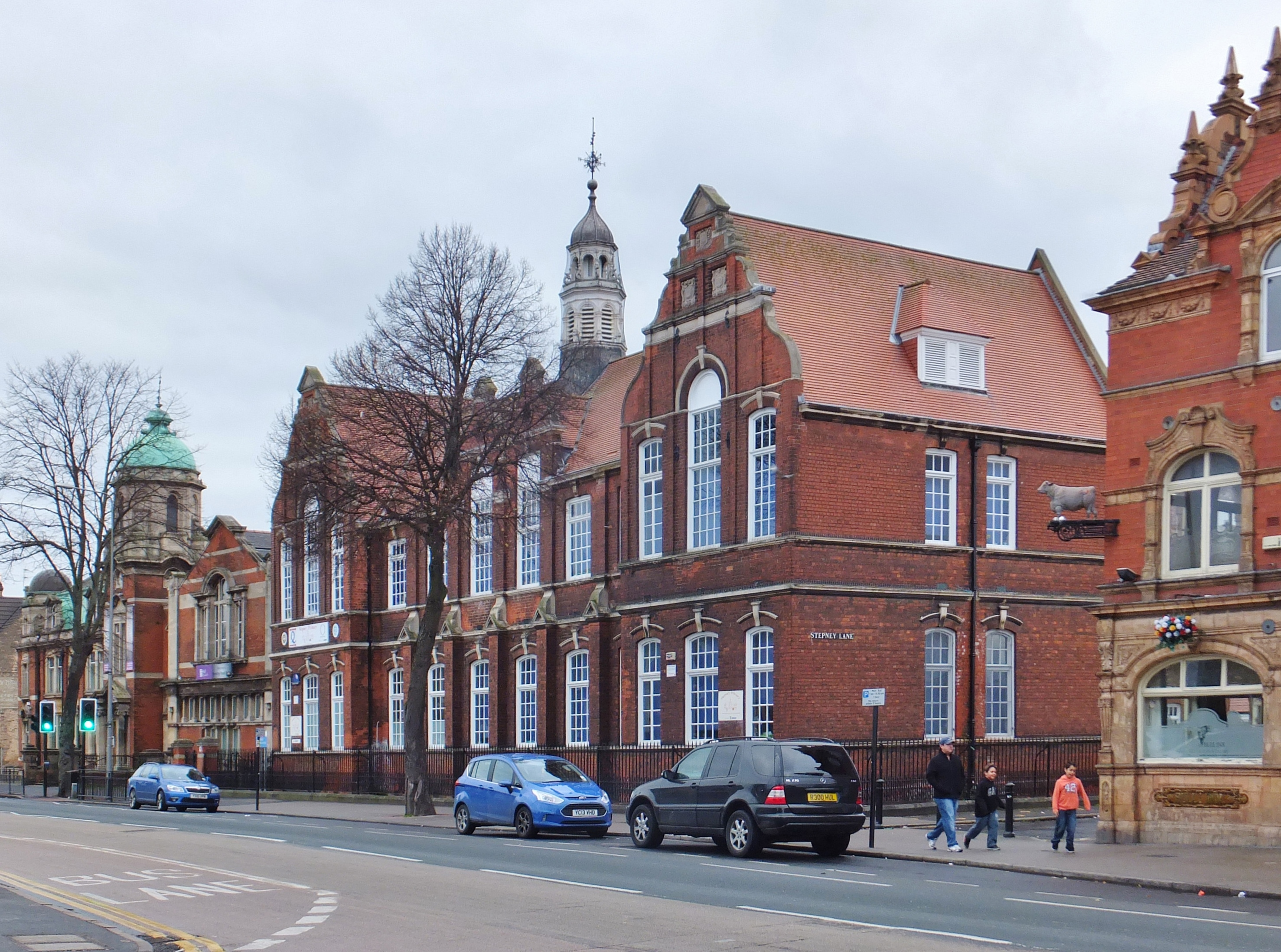
Stepney School, built 1886 for the Hull School Board (2013)

In 1886/7 the Hull School board (formed 1872) opened, at a cost of £11,470, a new school in Stepney to a Queen Anne revival design by William Botterill, built by J. Skinner of Hull. The building had a two main story block with attics and an octagonal bell turret/lantern providing ventilation, with boys accommodated on the ground floor and girls on the first; infants were housed in a separate department. The new school provided places for 889 children, and replaced some earlier schools. In 1908 the school was extended with a separate block for infants.

The Hull Street Tramways opened a horse operated tram route on Beverley Road in 1875. In the 1890s the company was acquired by the Hull Corporation and the decision made to electrify the route. A depot was opened south of Stepney Lane in 1898. (Note: The site was also known as Corporation Yard in the mid-20th century. Parts of the site were rail connected from the Victoria Dock Branch Line after the tram connections were removed. (OS 1:2500 1910, 1928, 1950–1, 1960))

South of the railway line on Beverley Road the Northern Library opened in 1895 in a gothic brick design. A branch of the Hull Savings Bank opened in 1901 across the Beverley Road from the railway station. The 'Bull Inn' was rebuilt c. 1903 to a design by Freeman, Son & Gaskell, the Rose Tavern was also rebuilt at around the same time. Beverley Road Baths opened in 1905 adjacent north of the 1886 Stepney school in an Edwardian Baroque design with a copper dome octagonal cupola, and an Art Nouveau tiled entrance hall within. The baths underwent a £3.75 million refurbishment from June 2020 until reopening in August 2021. The baths are a Grade II Listed building. The land of Stepney lodge was built over from the 1890s to the 1920s.

At around the beginning of the 20th century a bottling factory was built on the north side of Park Lane (demolished in the late 20th century), over the site of James Rank's mill. The coal sidings and timber yard south of Stepney station became a saw mill by 1910, and by the 1920s had become a billiard hall and cinema, The Coliseum (opened 1912); whilst a saw mill, later a furniture factory developed further west, south of the Victoria Dock Branch Line.

Stepney station closed in 1964, and in 1969 the Victoria Dock Branch Line closed. The track bed at Stepney was later converted to a foot and cycle path. The former "Coliseum" cinema (later the Rialto; and after the Second World War The National) closed in 1961 and became a bowling alley, but burnt down in 1974. (See also Closed cinemas in Kingston upon Hull.) By the 1980s the site including the former sawmill was empty, and was used for parking. In 1966 the paper manufacturers A. Mayfield and Sons of Stepney Mills ceased trading.

In 1976 General Accident built office buildings on Beverley Road south of the former station. The "Coliseum" cinema site was redeveloped as an Aldi supermarket in the 1990s. A small industrial estate Temple Street Industrial Estate was developed in the late 1980s / early 1990s. (Note: e.g. see Hull City Council planning applications: 90/01259/PO, 90/01292/PF, 89/01867/PF, 89/01880/PF, 86/01033/PF) A housing development for Chinese people was built on Park Lane opposite the Bull Inn c. 1995. The former "Temple Street goods yard" and "corporation yard" site was developed as playing fields with a sports hall in the early 2000s (used by Endeavour High School). A combined medical centre and supermarket with car park and takeaway restaurant was developed on the site of the former "General Accident" building in 2002.

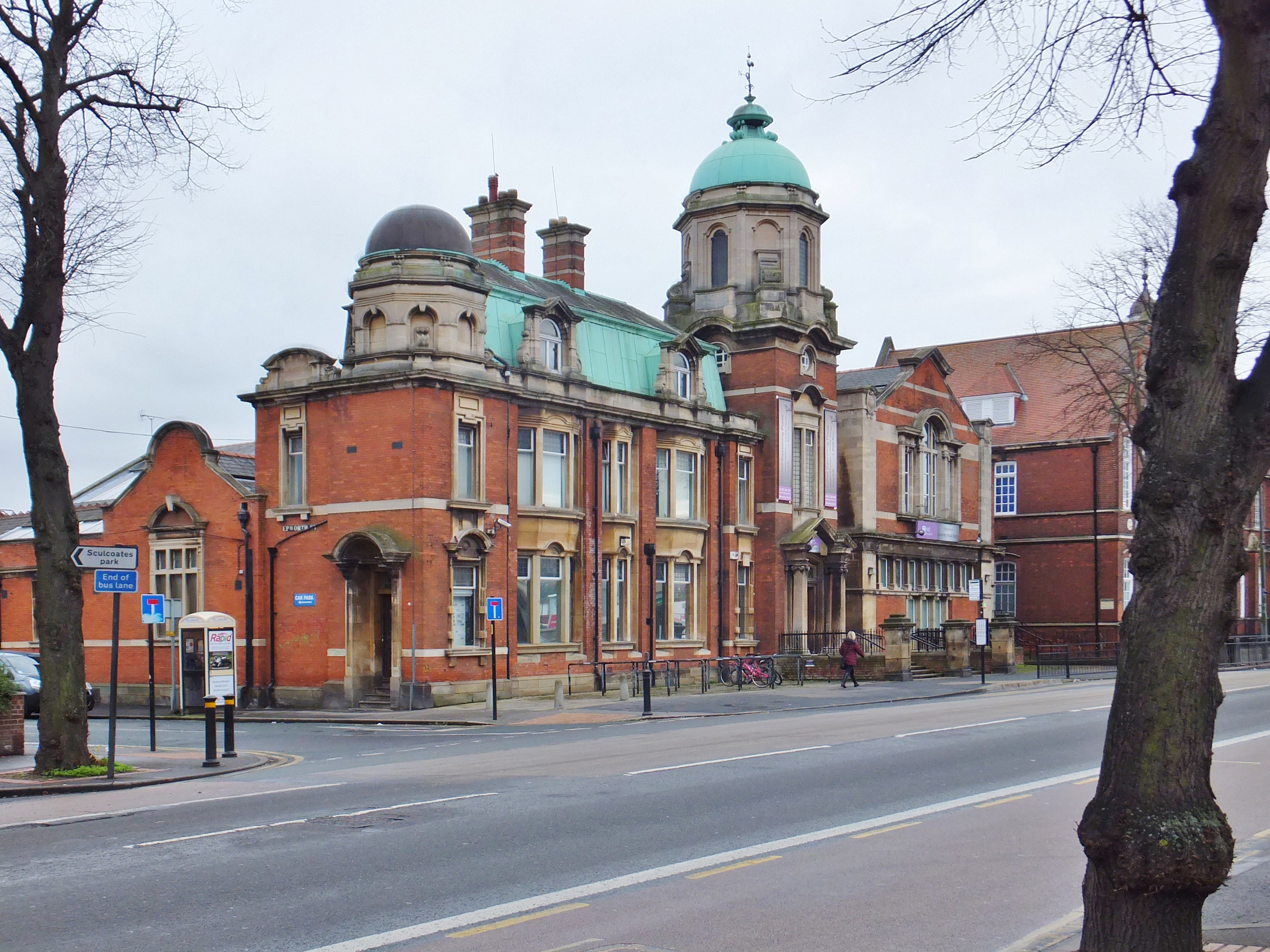
Beverley Road Baths, built 1905 (2013)

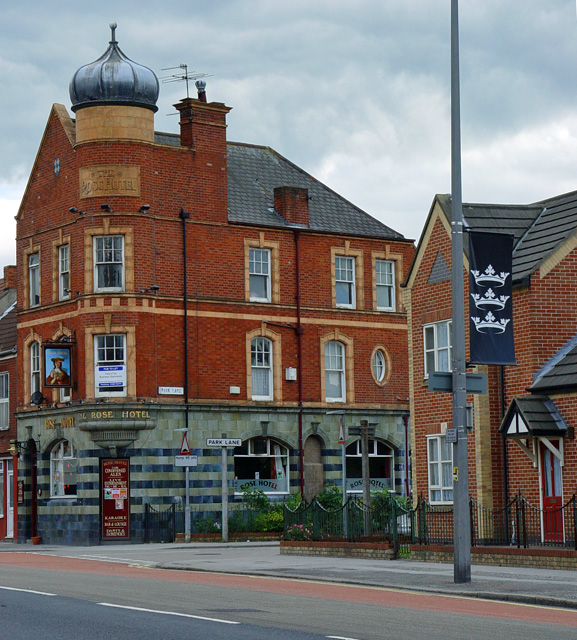
The Rose Hotel, built c. 1900 (2008)

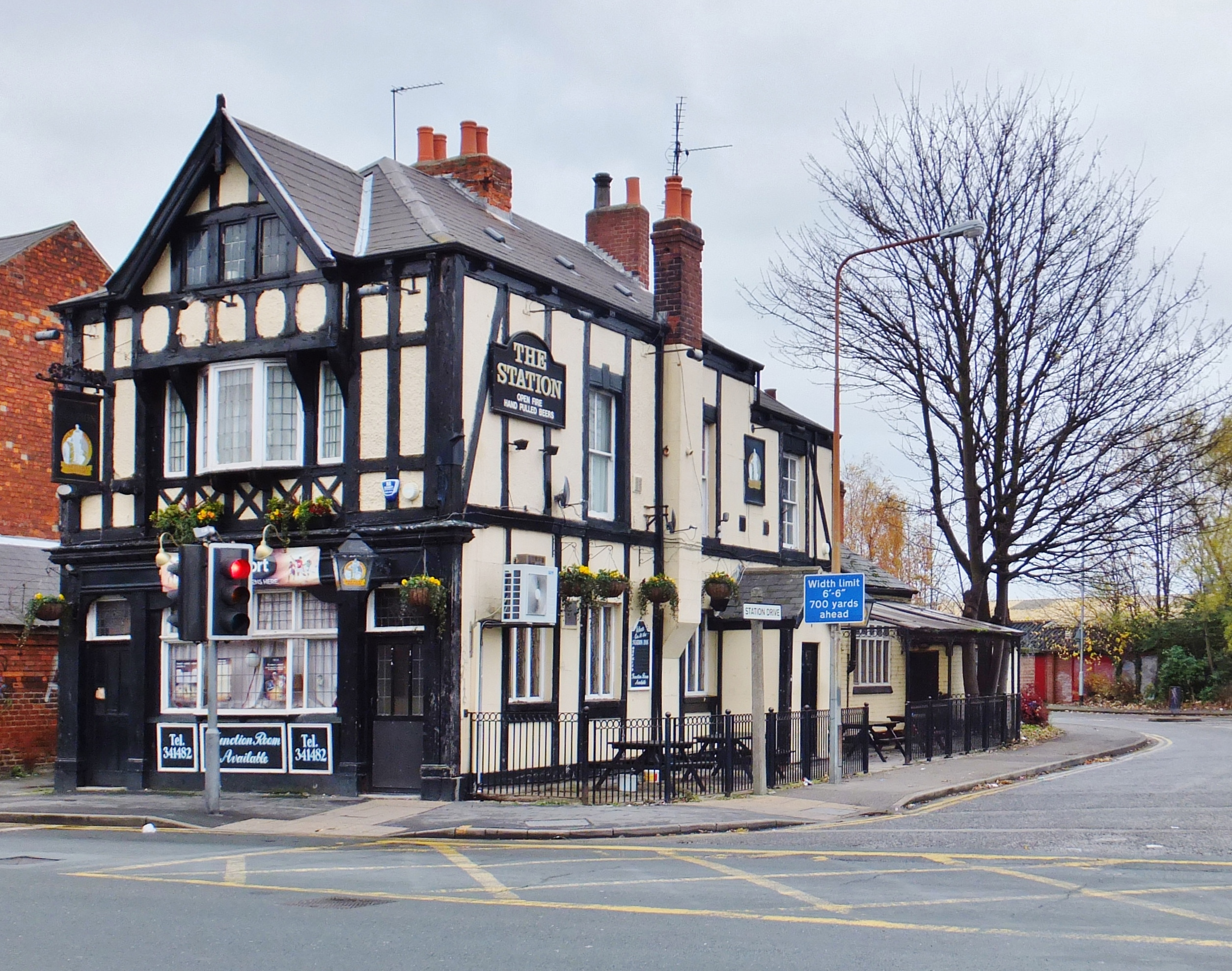
The Station Inn, formerly adjacent to the Victoria Dock Branch Line (2013)

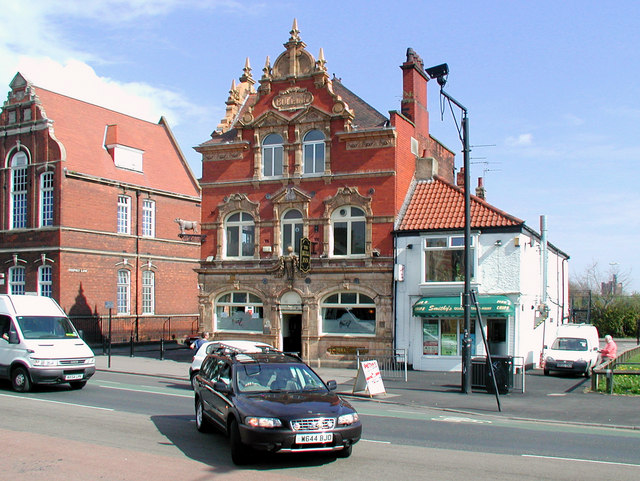
The Bull Inn, built 1903–4 (2009)

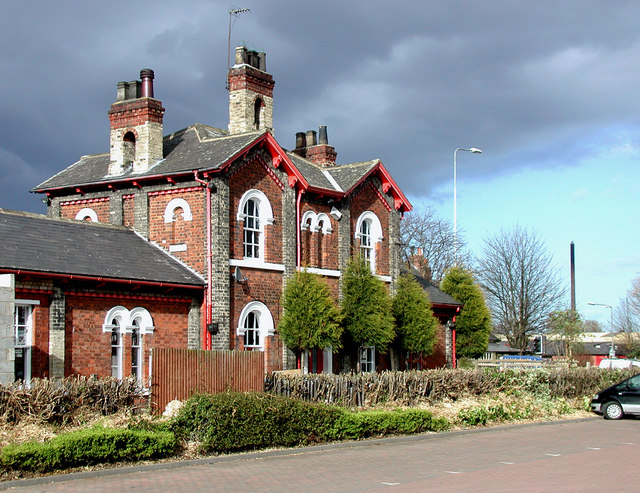
Stepney Railway station building (rear), built 1853 (2009)

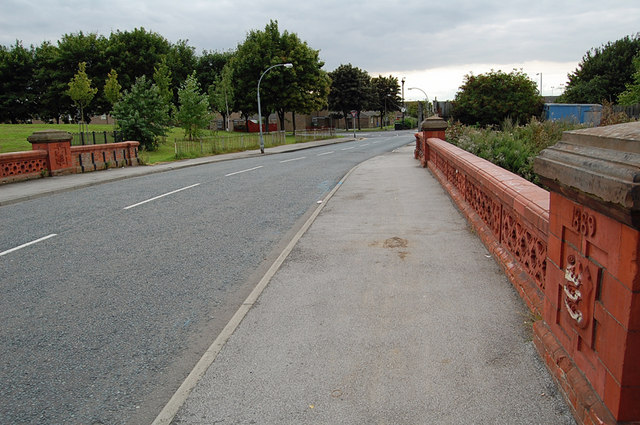
Bridge over the Beverley and Barmston Drain, on Sculcoates Lane, built 1889 (2008)

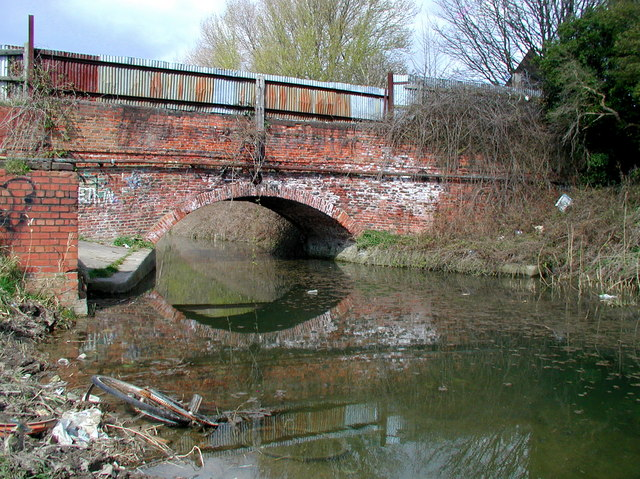
Bridge over the Beverley and Barmston Drain, on Stepney Lane (2009)

== In popular culture ==
Poet Douglas Dunn's 1967 Terry Street takes its name from the street in Stepney where he lived in the late 1960s.

== See also ==
- List of areas in Kingston upon Hull
