= Kingston Hospital (disambiguation) =

Kingston Hospital is in Kingston upon Thames, England.

Kingston Hospital may also refer to:

- HealthAlliance Hospital (formerly The Kingston Hospital), Kingston, New York, U.S.
- Kingston General Hospital, Kingston, Ontario, Canada
- Kingston General Hospital, Kingston upon Hull, England (closed)
- Princess Royal Hospital, Kingston upon Hull, England (closed)
- Kingston Public Hospital, Kingston, Jamaica

== See also ==
- List of places called Kingston
