= Wilmington, Kingston upon Hull =

Area of Kingston upon Hull, East Riding of Yorkshire, England

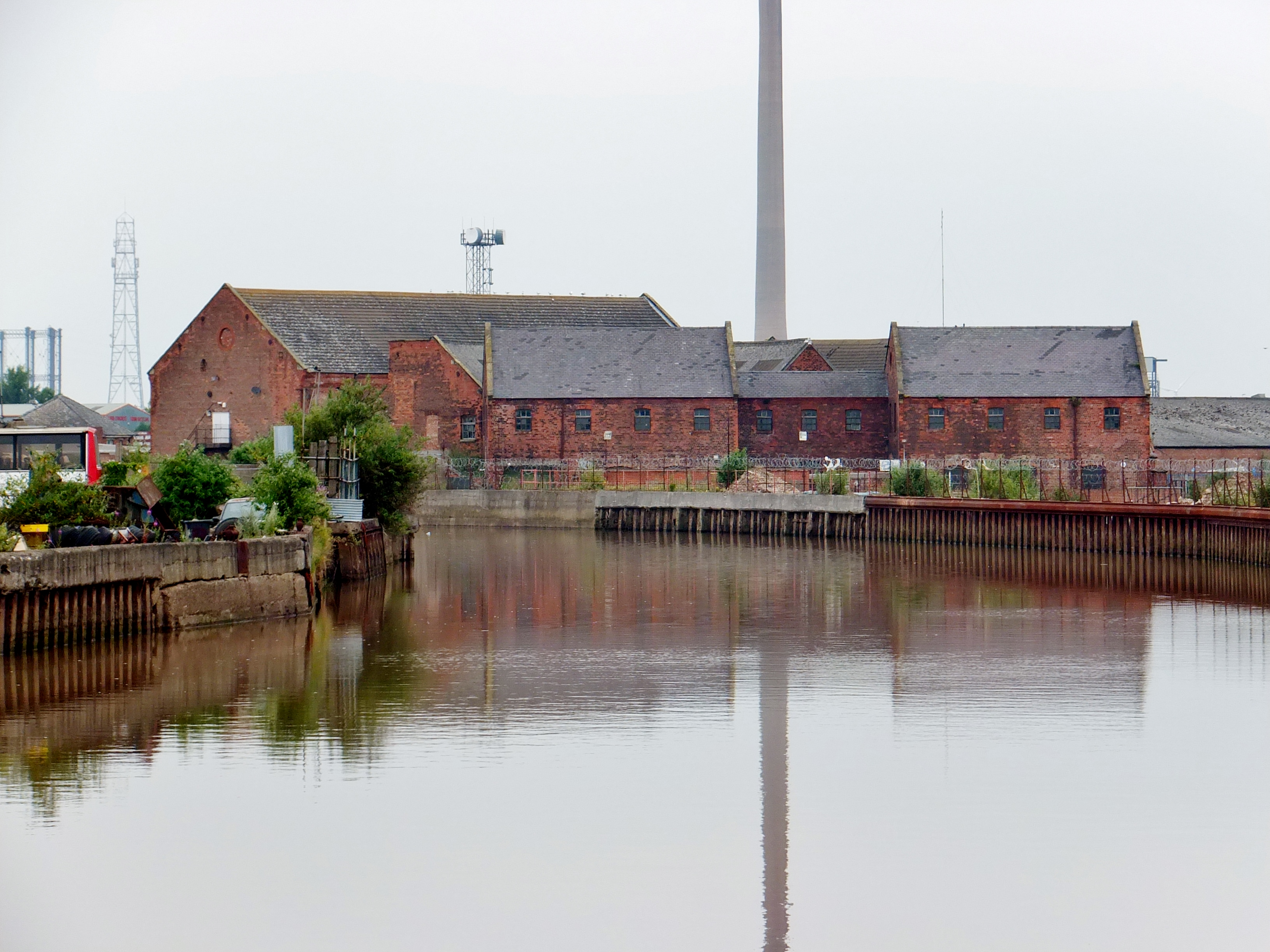
Glass House Row and late 19th century mill buildings from the River Hull (2013)

Wilmington is an industrial area east of the River Hull in Kingston upon Hull, England.

== Geography ==
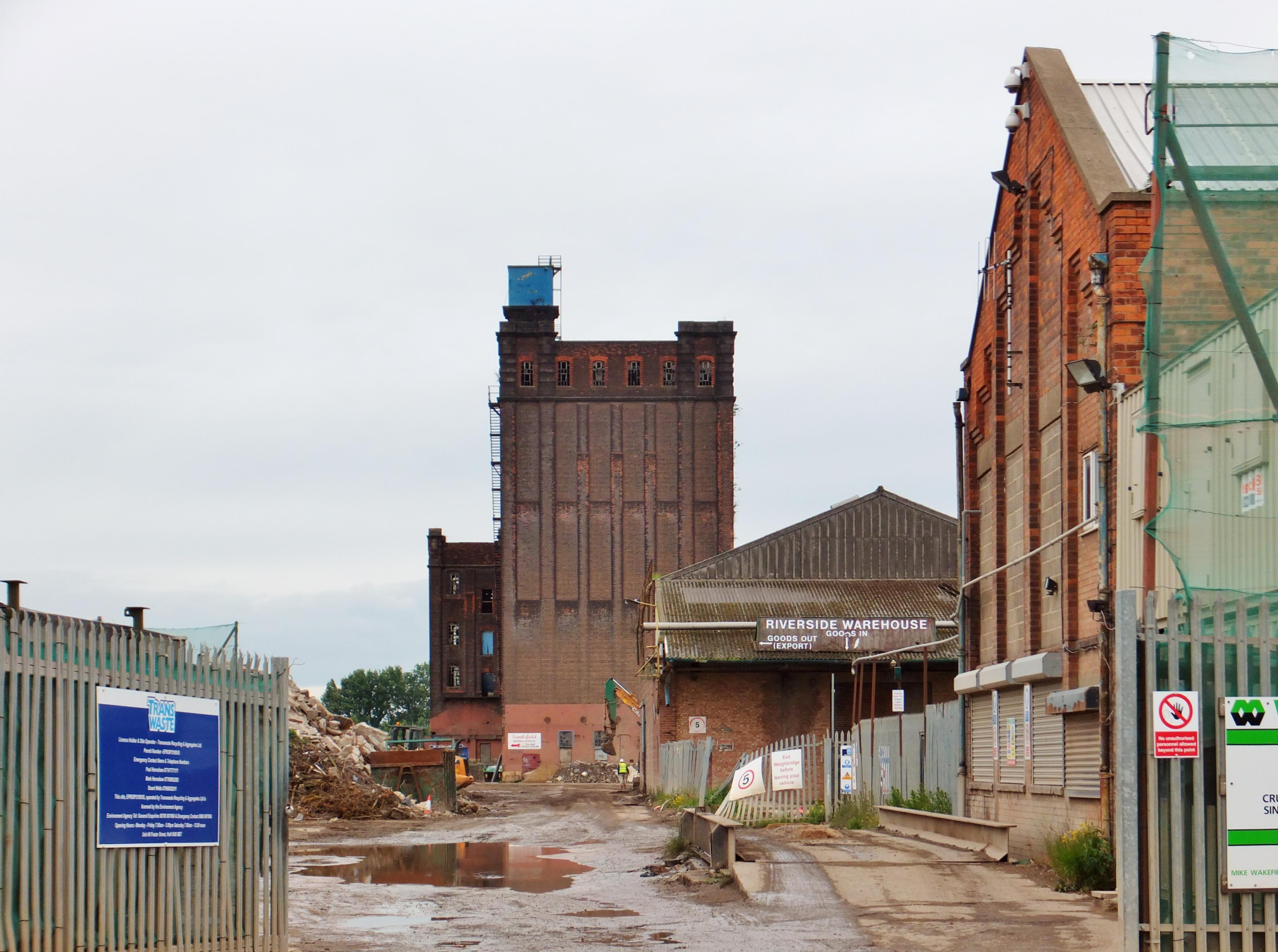
British Extracting Co. silo from Foster Street (2013)

Wilmington is bounded by the River Hull to the west, with Wincolmlee and Sculcoates beyond; Stoneferry is to the north; and to the south is the area known as The Groves in Drypool; to the east is Summergangs and the Garden Village. The area is primarily industrial, with activities including recycling, aggregates, manufacturing; as well as sales and service businesses, including those service industrial clients, and the building trade. Larger businesses and activities include the Robin Concrete Waste Disposal Ltd. plant, and the Stagecoach Hull bus depot.

Main roads are the A1033 (Stoneferry Road / Mount Pleasant) and A1165 (Cleveland Street) which run from the A63 Hull-Hedon main road in the south to Stoneferry in the north. The Hull Docks elevated railway also passes through the area. Crossings of the river are by the dock branch Hull Bridge swing railway bridge, and by the Sculcoates Bridge on Chapman Street at the northern and southern fringes of the area respectively. A former railway bridge, now a foot and cycle path, Wilmington Swing Bridge crosses the river roughly halfway between the two.

There is very little housing in the area, with the exception of a permanent caravan site, Wilmington Park. The area has some pollution/nuisance smell/dust problems: contributors include road traffic, factories, and waste-management facilities, the former cocoa factory was also a contributor.

== History ==
=== 19th century ===
In 1846 the Hull Glass Company was set up in Wilmington, on the north side of the street now known as Glass House Row. The company rapidly went out of business, being inactive by 1850. (Note: 53.7573°N 0.3285°W, Hull glass works)

The Victoria Dock Branch Line opened in 1853, passing east–west through Wilmington, crossing the River Hull at a new single track swing bridge Wilmington Bridge. (Note: 53.75878°N 0.33594°W, Wilmington swing bridge (1853))

By the mid 1850s development in Wilmington included the buildings of the glass works; a cement works and brick field; and in the southern part along the river a number of industrial buildings including the Phoenix Mill (oil), and Wilmington (oil and glue) and Greenland yards. (Note: The name "Greenland" often indicates a site used for processing whale, such as a whale oil manufactury. The Greenland Yard had a 'boiling house' (OS 1:1056 Town plans) – a necessity for the rendering of fat such as when extracted from a whale carcass.) Much of the area was undeveloped; the area was outside, and on the edge of the growth of the town of Hull.

The Hull and Hornsea Railway opened in 1864, initially terminating at Wilmington station, (Note: 53.7586°N 0.3277°W, Wilmington station (1854)) just before the junction with the dock line, in the same year the Victoria Dock Branch Line, excluding the River Hull bridge, was doubled. Sidings south of the junction between the Hull–Hornsea, and Victoria Dock Branch lines developed from a coal drops and a single siding in the mid 19th centuries, to a full goods station, Wilmington goods by the beginning of the 20th. (Note: 53.7574°N 0.3272°W, Wilmington goods station)

In 1866 Earle's Cement acquired the cement works on the near the river bank and land south of the Victoria Dock Branch Line; the works was connected by rail sidings to the dock branch. (Note: 53.7580°N 0.3333°W, Wilmington cement works) Production was around 3000t pa of Roman cement in 1870. From 1875 bottle kilns were constructed for the production of Portland cement, with a capacity of 38t per week by around 1882. From 1888 chamber kilns were installed, with 28 in total by 1898 with a total capacity of 980t per week. The first two Rotary kilns were installed in 1906, adding a capacity of 860t per week. Further rotary kilns were added in 1912 and 1920, by which time the location of the plant was seen as non-optimal, Earle's large plant in Hope, Derbyshire being preferred.

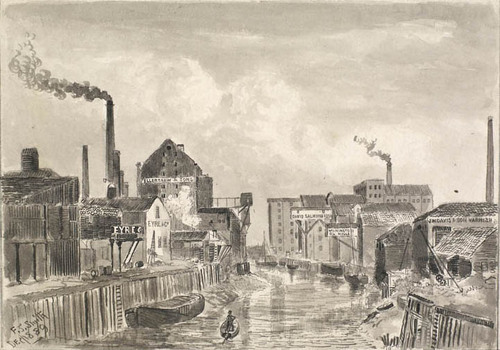
Sculcoates (left) and Wilmington (right) from Sculcoates Bridge c. 1889 (F. S. Smith)

At the southern edge of the area a swing bridge road crossing the River Hull, Sculcoates Bridge, was opened in 1875. (Note: 53.7542°N 0.3290°W, Sculcoates Bridge (Chapman Street)) The bridge consisted of a fixed span on the east bank of 27 feet (8.2 m) and a counterbalanced swing span made of 113 feet (34 m) girders, with a river span of 56 feet (17 m). The design was by J. Fox district engineer, the bridge was constructed by the Bridge and Roofing Co. of Darlaston. Total cost was £18,000. In 1885 the Hull and Barnsley Railway opened, with a branch to the new Alexandra Dock passing on an embankment through the northern extremity of the Wilmington area, crossing Cleveland Street at height; (Note: 53.76155°N 0.32846°W, Hull and Barnsley Railway dock branch bridge) a swing bridge was built over the River Hull. (Note: 53.76312°N 0.33389°W, Hull and Barnsley swing bridge "Hull Bridge") An embanked chord was built to connect the line to the Victoria Dock Branch Line, adding a third railway bridge over Cleveland Street. (Note: 53.76016°N 0.32827°W, Hull and Barnsley Railway, Victoria Dock Branch Line connecting chord bridge) (Note: The H&B constructed the infrastructure for a connecting chord between their line and the Victoria Dock Branch Line, but refused to complete the actual junction connecting their line and NER system.Tomlinson (1915, p. 707) Part of the line was later used for a branch to the sidings of the British Extracting Company. Barnett, A. L., ed. (1980). The Hull & Barnsley Railway. Vol. 2. The Branch was out of use by the 1970s (OS 1:10000 1971) As of 2006 the line nor embankment is no longer extant, though some land boundaries evidence the former route (OS 1:25000 2006).)

By the late 1880s urban growth in east Hull northwards from Drypool through the Groves had reached the edges of Wilmington; a school, Chapman Street school, was established on Chapman Street by the school board in 1888 for 866 children, it was expanded to a capacity of 1,163 students in 1902. (Note: 53.7546°N 0.3267°W, Chapman Street school) In 1898 an iron church was opened; it was replaced in 1903 by a brick church, St Saviour, architects Brodrick, Lowther, and Walker. (Note: 53.7593°N 0.3287°W, St Saviour's church)

=== 20th century ===
The large Swan Flour Mill (Rishworth, Ingleby & Lofthouse Ltd. (Note: Rishworth, Ingleby & Lofthouse Ltd. had Swan Mill built 1897 onwards. Capacity was doubled by the First World War. In 1921 the company merged into Spillers. The mill was badly damaged during the Second World War. Reconstruction of the mill took place from 1948–53, including a reinforced concrete silo.)) was built in 1897, (Note: 53.7548°N 0.3280°W, Swan flour mills) and expanded in 1898, with the silo added 1906. Also established by this time, north adjacent to the Swan Flour Mill were the Hull Varnish works; Wilmington Yard, later Cleveland Oil Refinery; Wilmington works; the Wilmington Oil Mills; (Note: Wilmington Mill, extant by 1874, sold by David Salmon & Co. to Edwin Robson 1889, merged into BOCM 1899, seed crushing ended 1931.) and a flour mill, later expanded as Wilmington Flour Mill. (Note: Wilmington Floor Mill acquired by the Cooperative Society in 1918.) Further north on Glass House Row was the Anglo-American mill, (Note: 53.7569°N 0.3301°W, Anglo-American Oil mills) also the Bon Accord Mill. (Note: John and James Stephenson (J. & J. Stephenson) built a mill with hydraulic presses in 1879–80, known as the 'Anglo-American mills', acquired by BOCM 1920–1, oil milling ceased 1930. The 'Bon Accord Mill' was built by the Stephen's Bros. in 1895, merged into BOCM in 1899. Oil milling ended in the 1929, restarted in the Second World War and closed 1942.)

In the early 1900s a canister (metal tins) works was established by John Wilson (Shipley); (Note: 53.7614°N 0.3293°W, Stoneferry Canister Works (Reckitt), later within 'Stoneferry business park') Reckitt and Sons acquired the works in 1907. (Note: The works remained a feature, with some expansions up till the late 20th century when a new industrial estate was developed in the area. (Ordnance Survey. 1:10560/10000 1893–4, 1911, 1938–46, 1956–7, 1969, 1971–7, 1982, 1992–4))

By 1910 urban growth north had reached the Victoria Dock Branch Line, mostly high density terraced and court housing, around Withernsea, Dalton, Cornwall and Chapman streets.

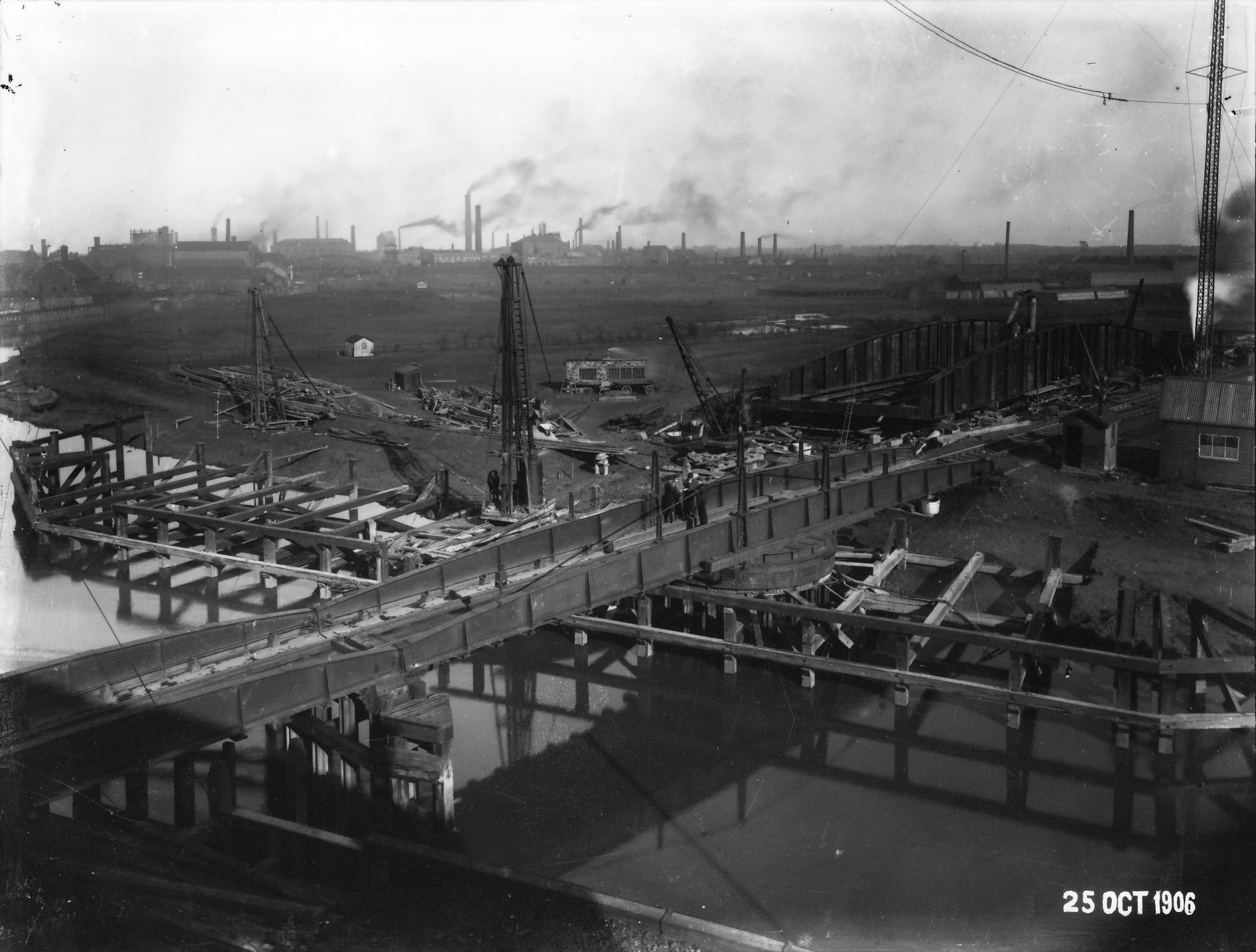
Wilmington Bridge undergoing replacement, old bridge over river, new bridge behind on far bank. (1906)

Between 1910 and 1912 the railway layout at Wilmington was altered: a new station was constructed west of the original on the Victoria Dock Branch Line, (Note: 53.75932°N 0.33168°W, Wilmington station (booking office)) and the level crossing at Cleveland Street replaced with a bridge. A new double track swing bridge had also been constructed over the Hull, c. 1905, slightly to the north of the original single track bridge. (Note: 53.75886°N 0.33606°W, Wilmington swing bridge (1912)) The bridge was designed by NER staff J. Triffit under W. J. Cudworth, and erected by R Woods (Westminster) with steelwork from John Butler & Co. (Stanningley): a 75°33' skew, made of plate girders to a 14 feet (4.3 m) maximum depth hogback design, 160 feet (49 m) long total. The bridge turning mechanism was electrically powered, using Siemens Bros. equipment, and controlled by a cabin above the bridge; the designer was Wilson Worsdell, also of the NER, and the contractors Cowans and Sheldon.

A cinema, the Cleveland on Cleveland Street, was opened in 1914.

In 1915 the British Extracting Co. (subsidiary of British Oil and Cake Mills) acquired the site of a former brickyards, and began oil processing operations; a large silo and river in-shipment facility was completed in 1919, to the design of architects Gelder and Kitchen. The plant was connected to the rail network by a branch line running off the Hull Docks Branch. The plant concentrated on the production of cooking fat and margarine. An extension factory for the production of New Pin Soap was opened in 1921. The British Soap Company entered into vigorous competition, affecting the soap business of Lever Brothers; in 1925 Lever Brothers acquired the parent company British Oil and Cake Mills, ending the cut-throat competition; the factory closed by 1934.

In 1940 Gill & Duffus established a cocoa mill, British Cocoa Mills (Hull) Ltd., at Cleveland Street, on the site of the former Wilmington works. (Note: Gill and Duffus part of Dalgety Group in 1985, part of E. D. & F. Man in 1990, In 1997 ADM acquired E. D. & F. Man.) (Note: 53.7566°N 0.3283°W, British Cocoa Mills)

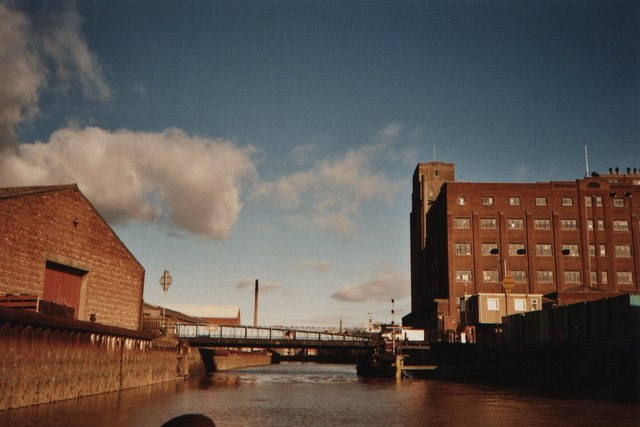
Sculcoates Bridge of 1875, and rebuilt Swan Mill, right, c. 1950. (2005)

The River Hull corridor was one of ten primary Luftwaffe targets during the Hull Blitz, and the focus of the attack on the nights of 13 and 18 March 1941. Spillers Mill was practically destroyed by the bombing, Also damaged were the Chapman Street school, and the Cleveland cinema. Spillers Mill was rebuilt in the late 1940s and early 1950s, including a reinforced concrete silo 160 feet (49 m) high with a capacity of 10,000 tons.

In 1948 an explosion and fire destroyed the Hull cocoa factory resulting in several deaths; a tank containing petrol used in the cocoa manufacturing process ruptured, and was ignited. A mill was rebuilt by 1952.

Wilmington station closed in 1964, the Victoria Dock Branch Line closed 1968. The Wilmington cement works closed in 1969. The Cleveland cinema was demolished in 1960.

Also in the 1970s the pattern of housing established c. 1900 was removed; by the 1980s practically none of the Victorian housing remained, and the area became predominately industrial or undeveloped. A caravan site opened in Wilmington in 1976. (Note: 53.7569°N 0.3270°W, Wilmington permanent caravan site) St Saviours church was demolished 1981.

In the 1990s the former Stoneferry canister works, with other land between the Victoria Dock and Hull and Barnsley railway branches west of Cleveland Street was redeveloped into an industrial estate Stoneferry Park; the 32 acres (13 ha) area included over 900,000 square feet (84,000 m^{2}) of old buildings, of which 200,000 square feet (19,000 m^{2}) were kept, and by 2002 a further 220,000 square feet (20,000 m^{2}) of new industrial accommodation had been built. In around the same time period a new bus depot for the Hull bus fleet (Stagecoach in Hull) was constructed to the south, the depot opened 1 September 1996.

=== 21st century ===
In 1999/2000 planning applications were submitted for a waste handling facilities including composting and incinerating facilities at Foster Street, with an incinerator on the site of the former British Extracting Co. works. The plans were submitted in relation to a 25-year waste management contract made with Waste Recycling Group by Hull City Council. The works included a 263 feet (80 m) chimney, and buildings of around 151 and 125 feet (46 and 38 m) high. The proposed £30 million works was to burn around 150,000 tonnes of waste per year, generating electricity plus 850 tonnes of ash re-usable for construction and 120 tonnes of ash requiring landfill disposal per year – the plans generated significant opposition. The incinerator was recommended for approval but refused by the council in 2001, and refused on appeal in 2003. (Note: The location moved to a site near Salt End. The incinerator plan at Saltend was opposed by the "Holderness Opposes the Incinerator" (HOTI) group and others, and the plan was terminated in 2011 due to increased costs, and higher levels of recycling.)

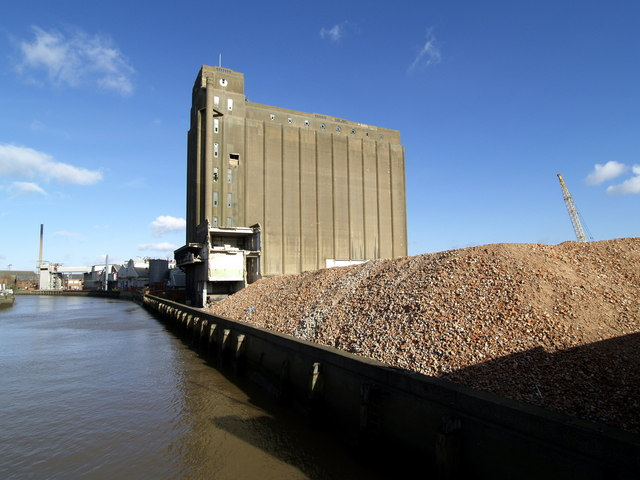
Remains of demolished Spillers mill, with 1950s concrete silo behind (2008)

The Spillers' Swan Mill was demolished c. 2007.

In 2010 ADM Cocoa closed the cocoa mill, citing overcapacity and a move of confectionery production to eastern Europe.

In June 2011 a planning application was submitted by Spencer Group for a waste-to-energy plant designed to generate 25.5 MW electrical and 3.4 MW gas energy via gasification and anaerobic digestion respectively. The plant was split over two sites, part on the site of the former cocoa and Spillers mills; and the second part to the north, west of Glass House Row. The plant was to use approximately 150,000 tonnes of waste wood, plus 37,000 tonnes of locally sourced commercial and industrial waste. The application was accepted in October 2011 and the project received a £19.9 million grant from the UK government (via the European Regional Development Fund) which was authorised by European Union in 2012.

In 2014 a joint venture of Spencer group and MWH Global subsidiary MWH Treatment was selected to build the first stage of the £150 million project. The plant obtained via auction CFD funding in early 2015, with a £119.89 per MWhr strike price. In late 2015 Spencer Group announced that funding for the scheme had been arranged, with construction to start early 2016, with the facility expected operational by early 2018.

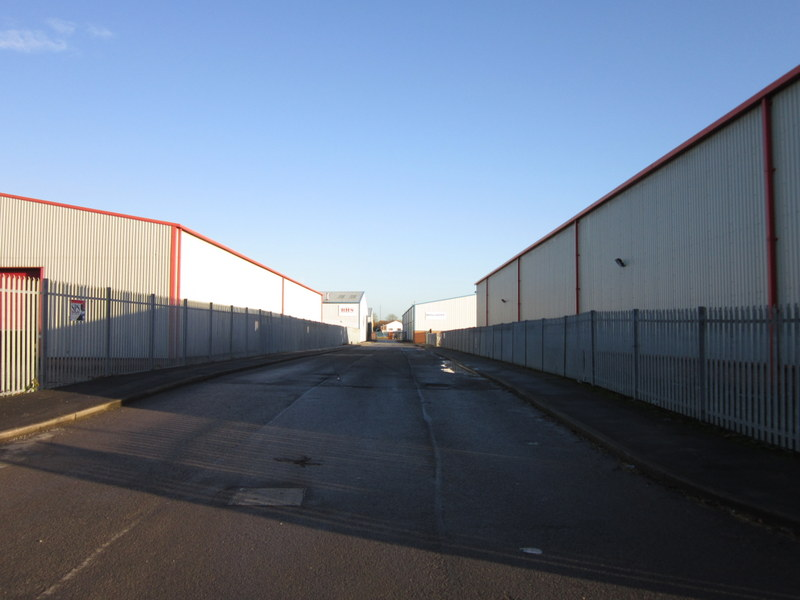
Stoneferry Park industrial estate (2012)

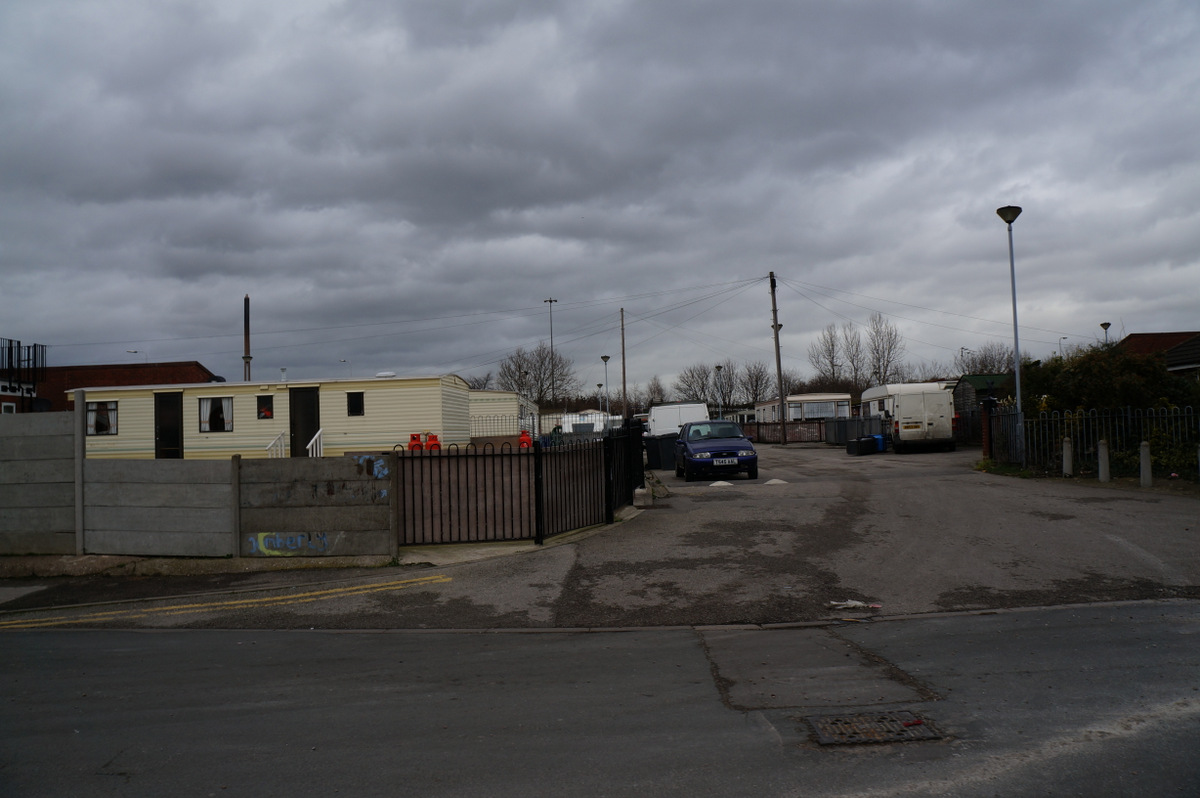
Bedford Street travellers site (2014)

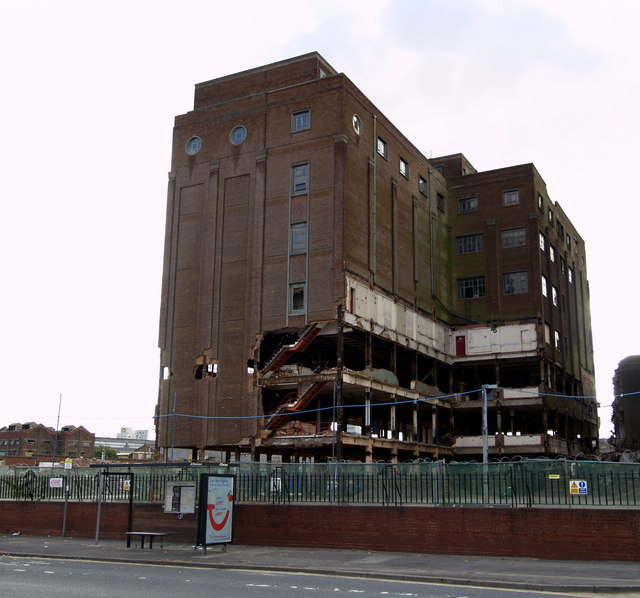
Spillers Mill under demolition (2007)

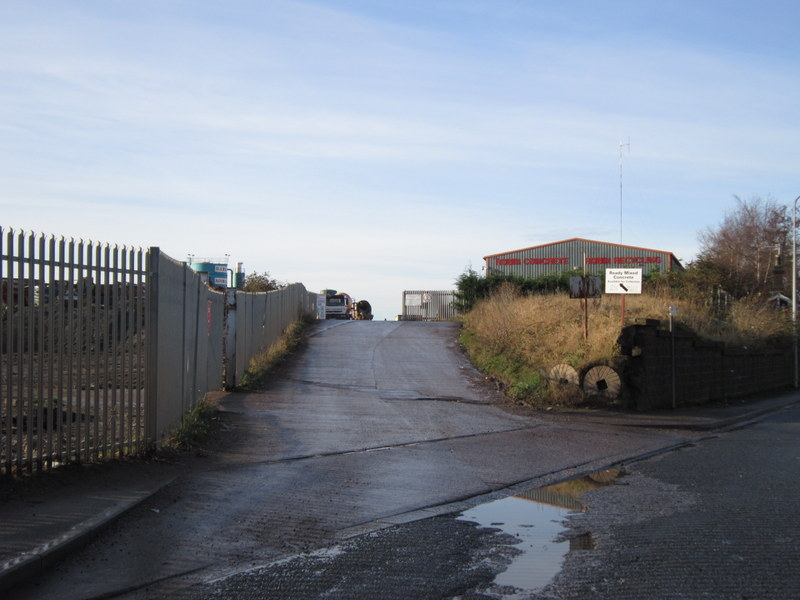
Robin Concrete entrance (2012)

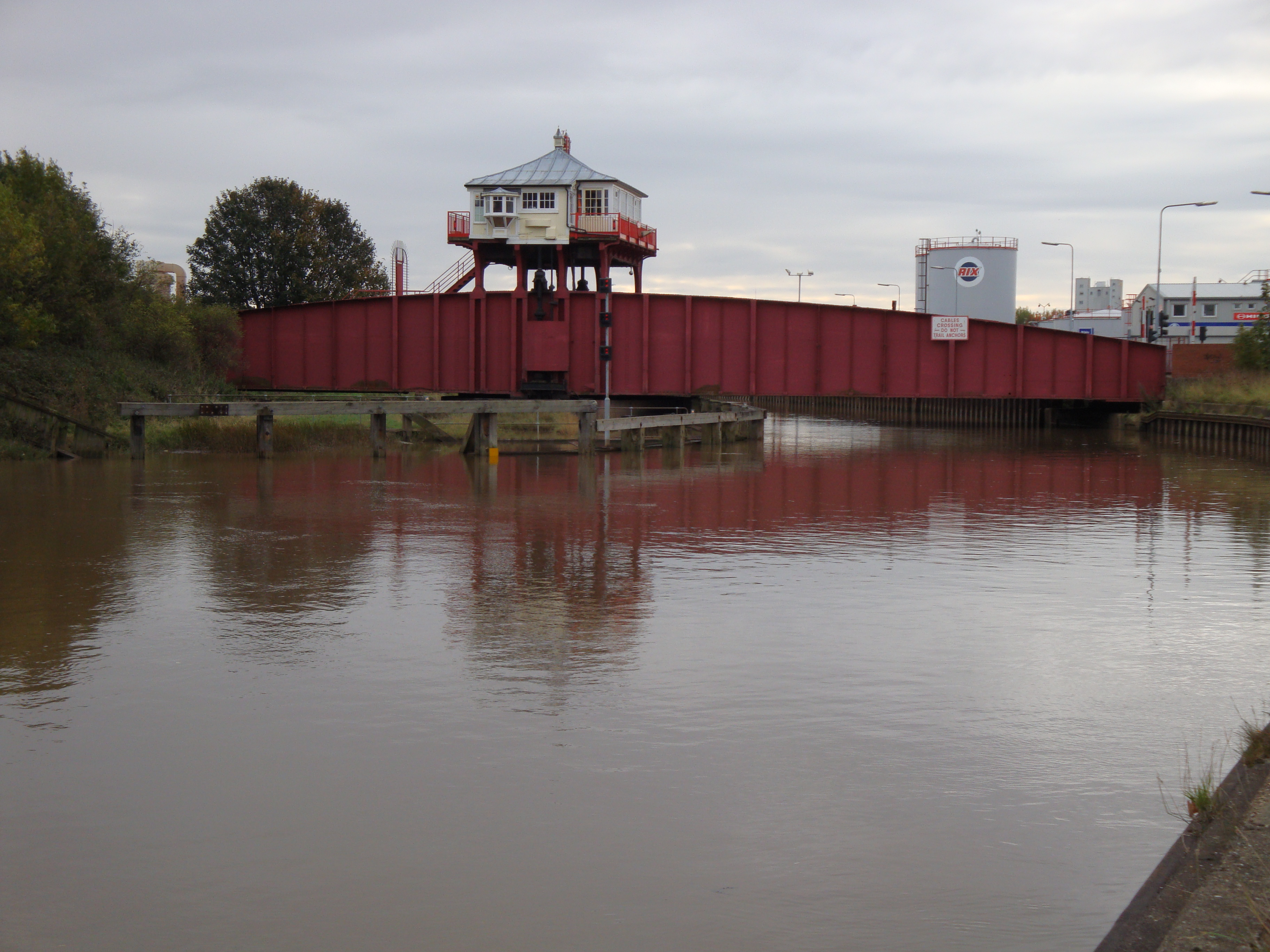
Wilmington railway bridge, now used as a footpath (2008)

== See also ==
- List of areas in Kingston upon Hull
