= Stepney railway station =

Stepney railway station may refer to:

- Stepney railway station, now known as Limehouse station, in the east of London, England
- Stepney railway station (East Riding of Yorkshire), in Stepney, Kingston upon Hull, England

See also

- Stepney Green tube station
