= Wilmington railway station (England) =

Disused railway station in Wilmington, East Riding of Yorkshire, England

Wilmington

General information
- Location: Hull, East Riding of Yorkshire; England
- Coordinates: 53.7596°N 0.3300°W
- Grid reference: TA102305
- Platforms: Two (1864), One island (1912)

Other information
- Status: Closed

History
- Original company: Hull and Hornsea Railway
- Pre-grouping: North Eastern Railway
- Post-grouping: London and North Eastern Railway

Key dates
- 1864: Opened
- 1912: resited
- 1964: Closed
Location

Wilmington railway station served the suburb of Wilmington, Hull, East Riding of Yorkshire, England. It was on the Hull and Hornsea Railway and acted as a temporary terminus of the line.

It was replaced in 1912 by a station of the same name west of Wilmington junction on the Victoria Dock Branch Line. The station closed 1964.

== History ==
=== 1864–1912 ===
53.7586°N 0.3277°W

The station was constructed at the Hull end of the Hull and Hornsea Railway, directly east of its junction (Wilmington junction) with the Victoria Dock Branch Line. The Hull and Hornsea opened 28 March 1864, with services terminating at Wilmington. Through running from Hornsea to Paragon station was planned from 1 June 1864, but delayed until 1 July due to the safety requirements of the board of trade.

The station closed after 9 June 1912.

=== 1912–1964 ===
53.75932°N 0.33168°W

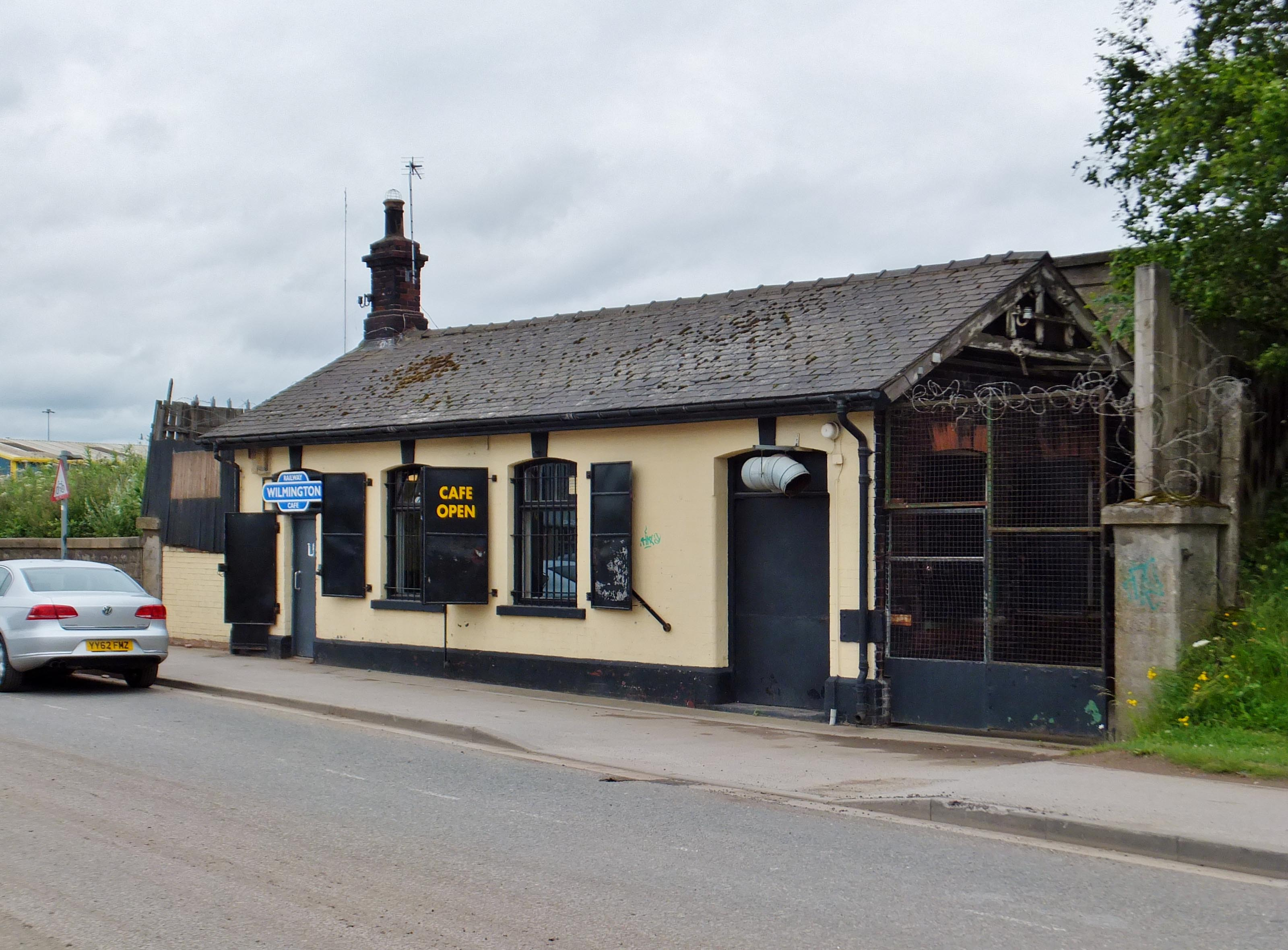
Former station booking office (2013)

In 1912 a new station was constructed west of the original on the Victoria Dock Branch Line; the level crossing at Cleveland Street was replaced with a bridge, at the same time a new double track swing bridge was constructed over the River Hull, slightly to the north of the original single track line. The station was built to an island platform design, accessed via a subway at the booking office on Foster Street.

The new station came into use in June 1912, replacing both the 1854 Wilmington station, and Sculcoates station to the west.

The station closed to passengers on 19 October 1964. As of 2010 the 1912 booking office and an entrance to a subway under the former trackbed are still extant, (as of 2014 in use as cafe).

Preceding station	Disused railways	Following station
Sculcoates	North Eastern Railway; Hull and Holderness Railway	Southcoates
Sculcoates	North Eastern Railway; Victoria Dock Branch Line	Southcoates
Sculcoates	North Eastern Railway; Hull and Hornsea Railway	Sutton-on-Hull
