= Closed cinemas in Kingston upon Hull =

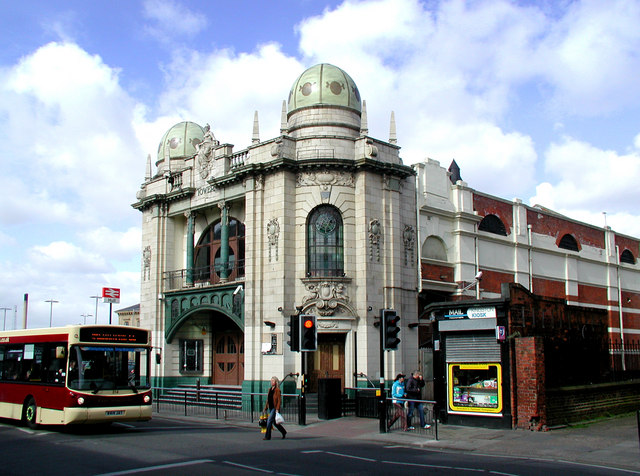
The Tower

In 1898, William Morton's Theatre Royal showed a 'Veriscope' film, probably the first time any film was shown in a Hull theatre. The Prince's Hall was the first purpose-built cinema in Kingston upon Hull, and was opened in George Street by Morton in 1910 (renamed the Curzon 1955). As Hull embraced the new age of public entertainment, attendances at traditional theatre declined. Luxurious cinemas, taking their inspiration from theatres and music halls, were built to accommodate audiences in almost every neighbourhood in the city. By 1914, there were 29 cinemas, theatres and halls showing films in the city. The London and Provincial Cinema Company owned the Hippodrome; the National Electric Picture Theatres owned the Theatre de Luxe, but Morton's was the largest and most influential cinema chain in Hull.

Since 1895, Morton had been a leading light in theatre and then, from 1910, also cinema. However, in 1935, with decline in theatre going, his long reign and businesses came to an end. Associated Hull Cinemas Ltd became the largest circuit in the city, owning 11 cinemas, and this enabled them to command the best films. The consortium later bought the Prince's Hall. Another expanding speculative group, City and Suburban Cinemas (Hull) Ltd, built the Regal, the Rex, the Regis, and the Royalty in rapid succession.

The number of cinemas in Hull peaked at 36 in 1938. British film making flourished during the war years and cinema attendances were much higher, but by the end of the Second World War there were only 25 (several had been bombed). By 1964, competition from radio and television (and latterly bingo) had reduced the number of cinemas to 10.

A number of old picture houses remain around Kingston upon Hull; one, the former National Picture Theatre is a ruin from the Hull Blitz, while others have been converted to different uses.

== Early days ==
=== William Morton ===
The first building in Hull expressly constructed for the 'exhibition of animated pictures' was undertaken by William Morton, Hull's theatre magnate, later known as 'Grand Old Man of Hull'. Morton entered into partnership with the New Century (Leeds) Circuit and registered a new private company (called Prince's Hall (Hull), Ltd.) with a capital of £10,000 in £1 shares to take over the site of the Victoria Hall, formerly the George Street Baptist Chapel. The picture house, with 1,500 seats, opened in 1910.

Morton's business life bridged the national and local development from theatre to cinema. In 1895, while still living in Greenwich, he took on the lease of Sefton Parry's Theatre Royal (built in 1871) on Paragon Street and appointed his son W. F. Morton as manager. In 1902, he established Morton's Ltd with two of his sons, George and W. F., and built the Alexandra Theatre in Charlotte Street. George was appointed manager. By 1910, cinematograph had long been part of the entertainment there, but that year George Morton brought in back-screen projection, considerably improving quality.

In 1907, Morton bought out the Grand Opera House in George Street, and put in 'W. F.' as manager. In 1909, he gave up the lease on the Theatre Royal (it later became the Tivoli). Then, in 1910 came the Prince's, the first purpose-built picture house. His next project, situated at the junction of Holderness Road and New Clarence Street, was the Holderness Hall. It cost £12,000, seated 2,000 people and opened in October 1912. It was sold in 1931. Eventually all the Morton Theatres were, partly or fully, operated as picture houses.

In 1914, Morton and his sons established another company, Morton's Pictures, Ltd. On 1 February 1915, this company opened their Majestic Picture House on the site of the old Empire Variety Hall in George Street. The work was designed and carried out by local architects, Freeman, Sons, and Gaskell, who had also designed the Prince's Hall and the Holderness Hall. The hall had a built-in wide screen and three projectors. A feature of the programme on opening day was 2,000 feet of Kinemacolor, the remainder of the programme completed by 'the highest class of films'. Tom Bogue, artist and Morton's son-in-law, became manager.

In September 1919, Morton's final venture was to purchase the Assembly Rooms on Kingston Square and to convert the larger hall into a picture house. As a business venture, this was less successful but did much better when converted into a dance hall. A smaller room became the Little Theatre.

In 1935 the Morton family businesses ceased to be financially viable and both their companies closed down. Tributes were paid to their long history of contributions to quality entertainment in the city. W. F. Morton died that June, William Morton, now aged 97, severed his connections with cinema and theatre and finally retired. Tom Morton was licensee of the Prince's Hall. Tom Bogue, son-in-law, manager of the Majestic, became licensee of the West Park Cinema, Anlaby Road. The Grand and the Majestic were sold to a consortium, Associated Hull Cinemas Ltd, and renamed the Dorchester and Criterion respectively, making this consortium the largest cinema group in the town with 11 properties. The Alexandra had been up for sale for 6 months but was then let to Terence Byron Ltd as a variety theatre.

=== Brinley Evans ===
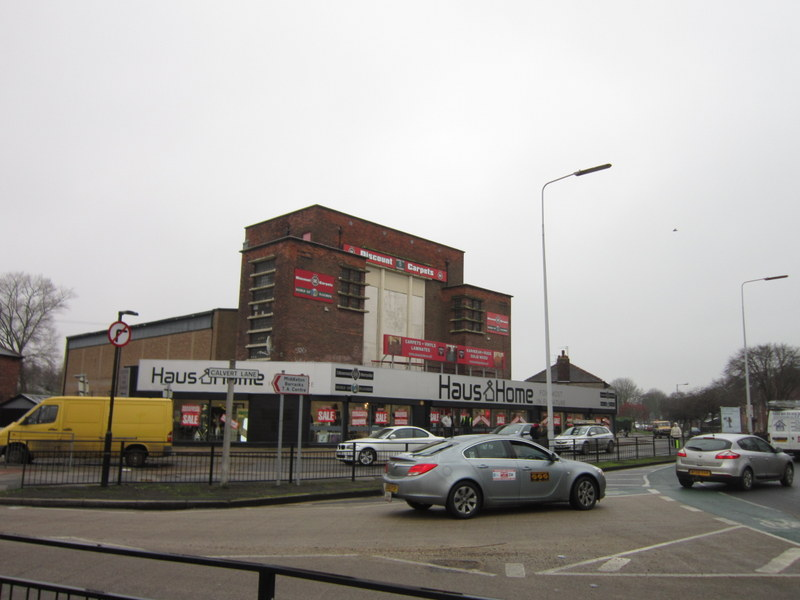
The Priory

Brinley Evans (managing director) came to be known as Hull's "Mr Cinema". The son of a local estate agent, Evans founded (Associated) Hull Cinemas Limited and went on to build up an impressive portfolio of thriving picture houses in and around the Hull area. His first acquisition was the Cleveland. A short time later, he acquired the Monica on Newland Avenue, and the centrally situated Theatre de Luxe, which he renamed The Cecil. Evans went on to acquire The National, on Beverley Road, and the Hessle Picture House. He built the Langham on Hessle Road, (which was the largest cinema in the north of England, at the time, seating 2,800 patrons). Further acquisitions followed – The Carlton on Anlaby Road, and The Savoy on Holderness Road.

By the 1930s Hull Cinemas Ltd also controlled the Plaza in Hessle, The Priory on Spring Bank West, and The Central on Prospect Street.

The Grand Theatre on George Street was bought from the Morton family together with The Criterion and The Prince's Hall. In the post-war 1950s, Mr Evans went on to build a replacement for his flagship theatre, The Cecil. It opened in 1955. His final venture – The Berkley, opened in 1956 just nine days after ITV became available in the area. Located on Hull's Bilton Grange Estate, some five miles to the east of the city centre, the purpose-built cinema, modelled on the new Cecil building, wasn't the success the company had hoped for. Commercial TV had arrived, and for Mr Evans, some difficult choices were to lie ahead.

== Lost cinemas ==
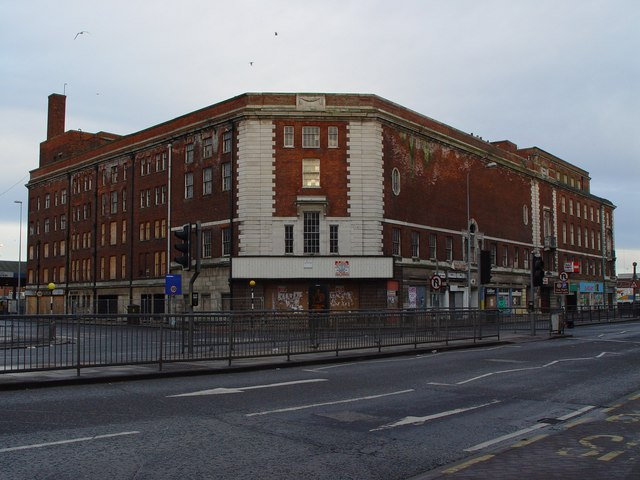
Regal cinema

The lost cinemas that are identified here include their most recent known name and are ordered in their approximate region. The list includes those already mentioned in 'Early days' above.

=== City centre ===
By Paragon railway station at 132 Ferensway, and built by the County Cinema chain, stood the Regal. Completed 6 weeks ahead of schedule and opening on 26 January 1934, the vast Regal Cinema with 2,553 seats in stalls and single balcony, was the centrepiece of a £95,000 development mixing leisure, retail and office units. Three years after opening it was acquired by Associated British Cinemas (ABC) on 8 November 1937. In 1989, amid talks of closure the ABC Regal was renamed Cannon, before finally closing 29 June 1989. The building was demolished in 2004, to make way for the St Stephens development. The other three ABC cinemas – the Royalty, Rex and Regis – were built in 1935 for City and Suburban Cinemas (Hull) Ltd., before being acquired by the larger national company.

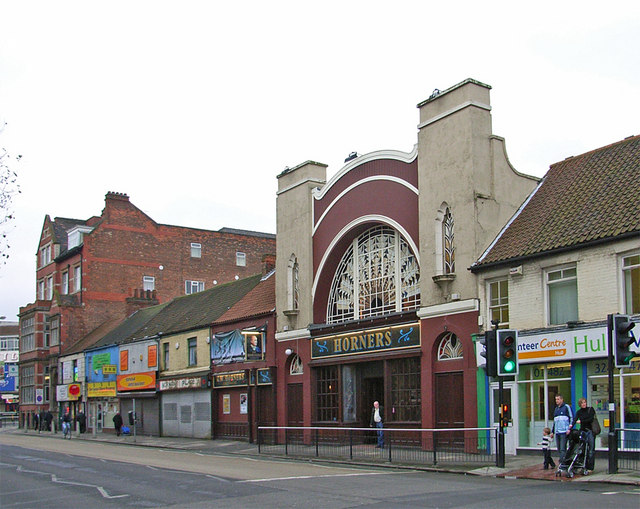
Regent Cinema

=== Anlaby Road ===
On Anlaby Road were the Cecil (by Ferensway), the Tower (built 1914), and the Regent (built 1910 as Kinemacolor Palace; renamed 1919), all within the city centre.

The original Cecil was called the Theatre De Luxe and opened in 1911. In 1925 it was demolished and rebuilt to a radically changed ground plan. The auditorium had been along Ferensway, now it was perpendicular to that road. It re-opened as the Cecil on Monday 28 September 1925. That theatre was destroyed during a night of air raids on 8 May 1941 but the remains were not cleared until 1953. Work on the new Cecil was begun in April 1955, on the site of the former Mariners' Hospital diametrically across the junction from the 1925 Cecil. It opened on 28 November 1955 with 1,374 seats in the stalls and 678 in the balcony. The cinema operation was closed on 26 March 1992. The building continued to be maintained by Mecca Leisure Group as a bingo hall following the closure of the cinema, however the bingo hall was closed in February 2023, leaving the building currently unoccupied.

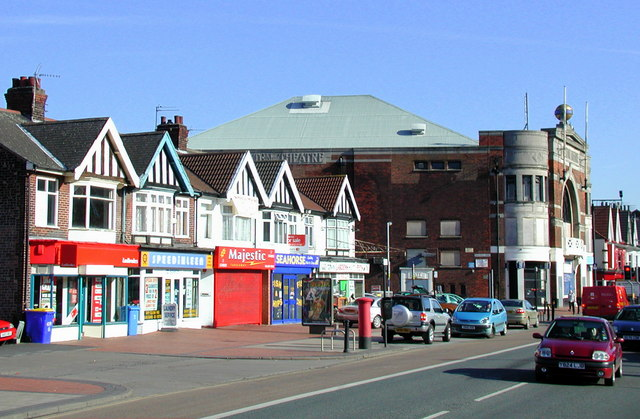
Carlton Picture House

Anlaby Road was also home to a short lived open air cinema. The Garden Cinema lasted just four months, between July and October 1912. Managed by Arthur Graham, it was situated on open land to the west of the Emigrants Station. The Pavilion Picture Palace opened on the same site in the summer of 1915. It closed in 1917.

The West Park Palace at 419–421 Anlaby Road, was opened in 1914 and later known as the West Park Picture Theatre. By 1935 it was licensed as the West Park Theatre and in 1950 was referred to as the West Park Cinema.

Further west at 474 Anlaby Road was the Carlton Picture Theatre, opened on 9 September 1928, designed by Blackmore & Sykes and built by Greenwood & Sons. It was run by Hull Picture Playhouse Ltd. It continued unaltered (save for minor war damage) until April 1967, after which it became a Mecca Bingo Club until 2008.

=== West ===
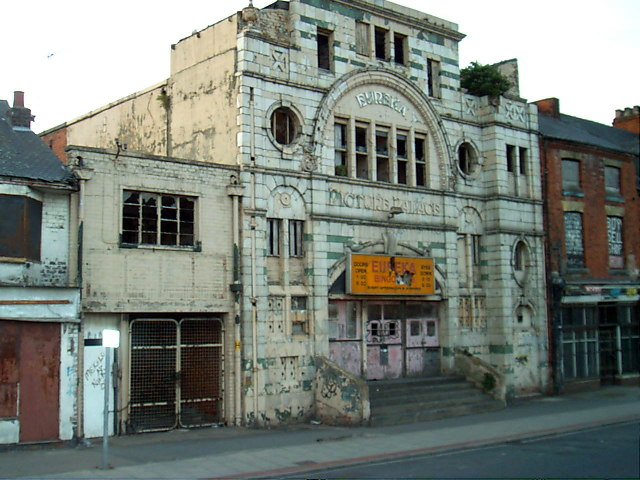
Eureka Picture Palace

On Spring Bank West from 1938 to 1959 was a large cinema, the Priory, since used as retail premises.

Travelling west on Hessle Road the first cinema reached was the Langham. Built in 1929, it was on the sites of both the Magnet (in West Dock Avenue) and the Hessle Road Picture Palace (both of 1912). Next reached was the Eureka of 1912, then ABC Regis, and finally the Plaza at Hessle Square.

Much later, the 8-screen UCI opened on 16 November 1990 in the St Andrews Quay development near Hessle Road. It was closed on 1 July 2004. Taken over by the Terra Firma Group who operated Odeon Theatres Ltd. on 28 October 2004. At that time Odeon were already operating their own purpose built 10-screen cinema and they never re-opened this one. It was demolished in early-2005 and a Currys electrical store was built on the site. Seating capacities in the screens were; 172, 172, 152, 174, 468, 275, 134 and 152.

=== East ===
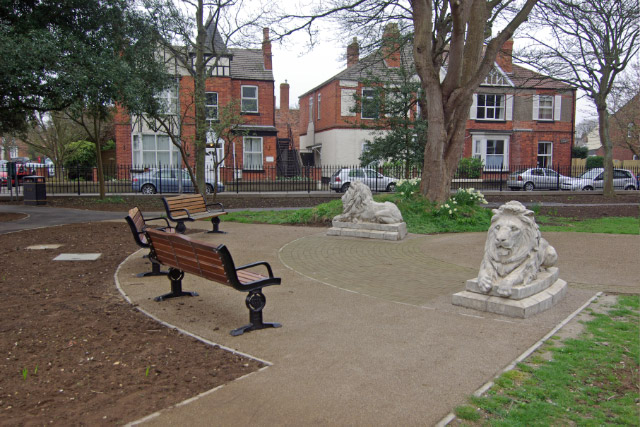
The lions of the Criterion, now at the Memorial Gardens in Hornsea.

Cleveland Street had one cinema – the Cleveland, built 1914, damaged and re-opened in 1941 and finally closed in 1960.

Heading east, the only cinema on Hedon Road had been the short-lived Picture Palace of 1912–1914.

On George Street were the Dorchester (renamed and remodelled in 1935 from the Grand by Associated Hull Cinemas Ltd. It opened on 30 December with Will Hay in “Boys Will Be Boys”); the Curzon (renamed from the Morton's Prince's Hall, built 1902) and the Criterion (renamed under new ownership after renovation in 1935; formerly the Majestic, built 1915). In 1950 the Criterion was owned by Associated Hull Cinemas Ltd. (The lions which originally guarded the approach steps to the cinema are now in Hornsea Memorial Gardens.) The Alexandra on Charlotte Street (built by Morton in 1902) was destroyed by enemy bombing in May 1941.

Continuing on to Witham along Holderness Road, at the corner of New Clarence Street was the Gaumont (renamed from the Holderness Hall in 1950). It was opened on 16 November 1912 by Morton's Ltd. as the Holderness Hall Cinema, a large luxurious cinema with a cafe. It was sold to Gaumont British Theatres in 1931, but not renamed Gaumont until 3 July 1950, by which time the company was owned by the Odeon. It closed just nine years later on 10 November 1959. It reopened as the Majestic Ballroom and when this closed on 7 March 1965 bingo took over. Eventually it was gutted to form a large furniture warehouse. It was demolished in early 2004.

Also on Holderness Road was the Ritz at 110 (opened as the East Hull Picturedrome in 1912), the Savoy at 310 (built 1923); off on Southcoates Lane was the ABC Royalty; further out on Holderness Road was the Astoria and on post-war Bilton Grange's Greenwich Avenue, stood the Berkeley which was opened in 1956.

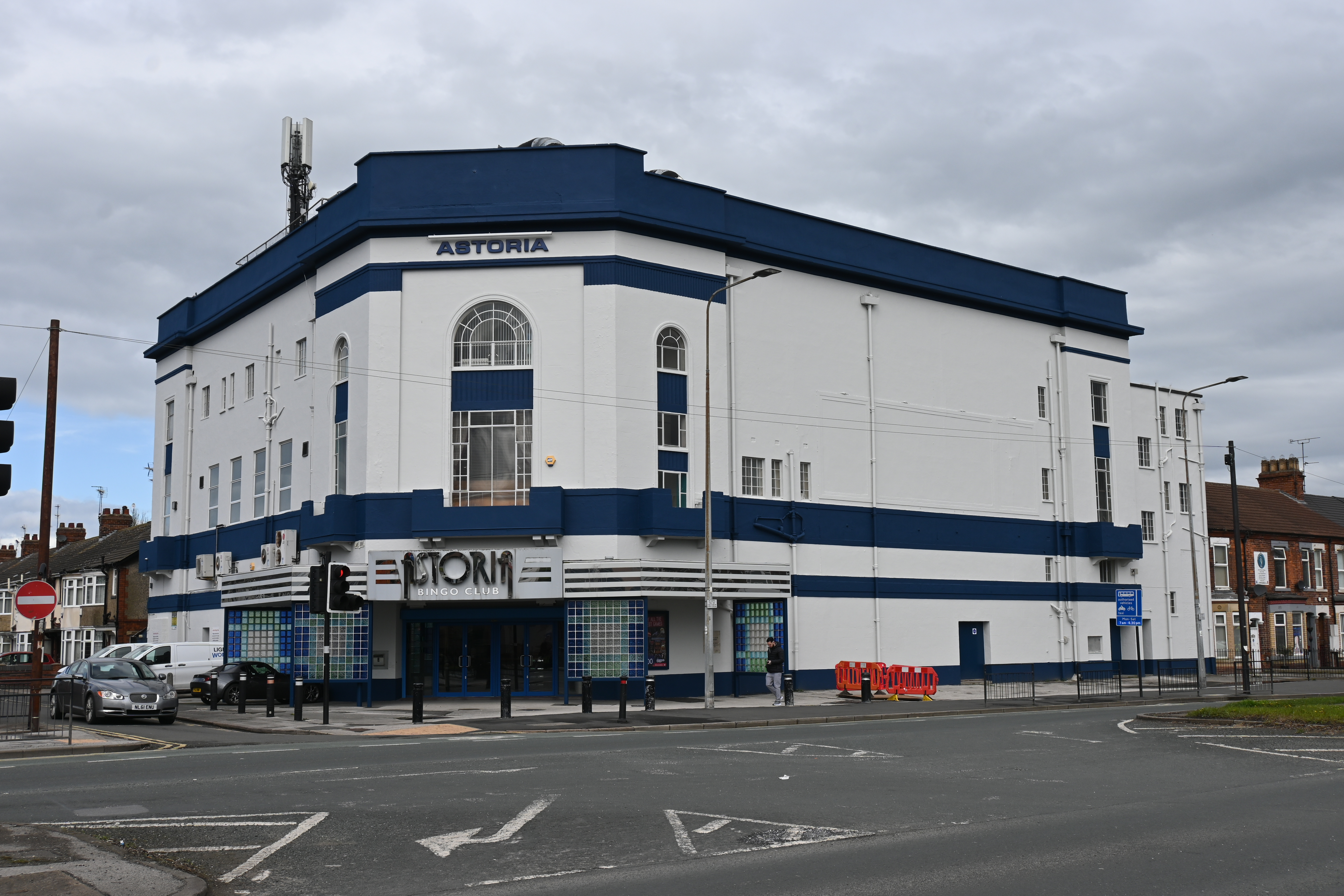
Astoria Cinema

The Astoria Cinema opened on 30 July 1934 on Holderness Road at the junction with Lake Drive near East Park. Designed by architect James E. Adamson of London and Hull and constructed by Messrs Markwell, Holmes and Hayter Ltd. Seating was 1,000 in the stalls and 500 in the single balcony above which was a large saucer dome with concealed lighting. In 1935 it was taken over by the County Cinemas circuit, but returned to an independent operator a year later. It closed on 7 June 1963 and immediately reopened as the Astoria Bingo Club and continues to this day. Film composer, John Barry, performed here in the late 1950s, leading his band The John Barry Seven.

=== North ===
The Waterloo, open from 1920 to 1959, was in Waterloo Street.

Beverley Road had the Strand (built 1914, closed 1960 and demolished after a 1965 fire). The National had been opened as the Coliseum in 1912, renamed the Rialto in 1920, later becoming the National, taking its name from the National Picture Theatre which had been gutted by fire during the Hull Blitz. The National became a bowling alley in 1961 and burnt down in 1974. The Mayfair was a cinema from 1929 to 1964; from 1965 it was used as a bingo hall. In 1998 it reopened as a pub, the Hogshead then became The Hollywood & Vine until 2011 where it lay disused. In 2015 it underwent a £1 million transformation into a complex of 30 "smart flats".

The Monica (built 1914) was on Newland Avenue, closing in 1961, and since 1965 has been the Piper Club. On North Hull Estate's Quadrant was the ABC Rex.

The Londesborough was situated on Wenlock Street. Built in 1926, it closed in 1959. It was demolished in the 1970s after being used as a warehouse for a removal company.

== Second World War in Hull ==
=== March 1941 ===
On the 17th and 18th, several cinemas were destroyed, including the National Picture Theatre on Beverley Road. This was the third major raid that month and lasted six hours with bombs dropped over a wide area of Hull. It resulted in nearly 100 deaths. The Alexandra was also destroyed that year. And also the Ritz (formerly the Holderness Road Picturedrome), the Picture Playhouse on Porter Street, the Central in Prospect Street and the Sherburn (Sherburn Street).

=== May 1941 ===
Two major air attacks took place on the nights of 7 and 8 May and the Cecil Cinema, the Ritz and the Alexandra Theatre were destroyed. So also were many major and well known buildings including the department stores of Hammonds, Edwin Davis, and Thornton-Varley. On the docks the Riverside Quay was destroyed by fire. The Rank Flour Mill was directly damaged, as was the Corporation bus depot and the buildings of the Hull Corporation telephone system. Over 400 people were killed with many casualties due to bombs hitting communal bomb shelters.

=== March 1945 ===
The area around the Savoy on Holderness Road was attacked on 17 March by a Heinkel He 111. Twelve people were killed and twenty-two injured, many leaving the theatre after a film. They were the last civilians casualties of the Second World War in Britain to be caused by a crewed aircraft. A memorial plaque is mounted on a wall at this site.

=== National Picture Theatre ===
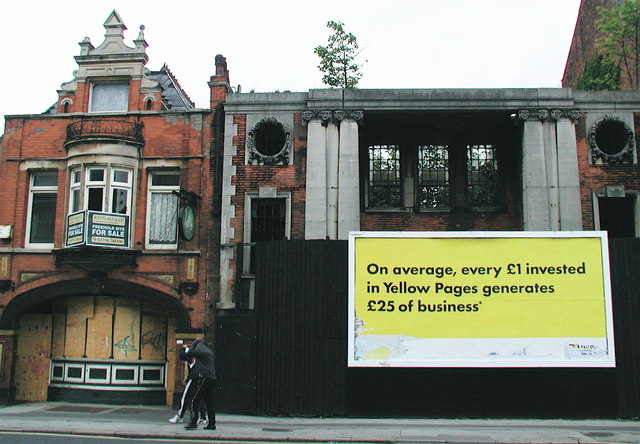
The Grade II listed National Picture Theatre, bombed in the Hull Blitz.

The original National Picture Theatre was built at Beverley Road and opened on 23 December 1914. It was run in conjunction with the Theatre de Luxe (Anlaby Road). During heavy raids on the night of 17/18 March 1941, along with five other theatres, the National Picture Theatre fell victim. At approximately 10 pm, the cinema suffered a direct hit to the rear of the auditorium from an air-borne-mine. This caused destruction to a large part of the building and the collapse of the roof. Fortunately the audience on that night, who had been watching Charlie Chaplin’s The Great Dictator, had heard the air-raid warning and gathered in the cinema's foyer; remarkably, the 150 people sheltering escaped with their lives.

As of 2016 the site has not been redeveloped and the remains of the building still stand. What is left now is a grand classical façade, behind which are the remains of the foyer, ticket booth, stairways and the rear section of the gallery. The site of the auditorium to the rear was reduced to rubble by the bombing.

The National Picture Theatre is the last surviving ruin of a blitzed civilian building left standing in Britain. Its cultural significance as a building of particular national importance & special interest was marked in 2007 by a Grade II listing, thus protecting it as a memorial for future generations.

A campaign was initiated by the National Civilian WW2 Memorial Trust, to have the remains of the Cinema and the adjoining Swan Inn developed into a memorial and tribute to all those who endured the Blitz during the Second World War.

In March 2020, work was undertaken to stabilise the foundations of the structure. Funds for the building's full restoration, awarded by Hull City Council (£178,300) and the National Lottery Heritage Fund (£277,600), will commence in 2024.

== See also ==
- J. Arthur Rank, 1st Baron Rank, Hull born founder of the Rank Organisation
- Former cinemas in Harringay
