= Endeavour Learning and Skills Centre =

Adult education centre in Kingston upon Hull, England

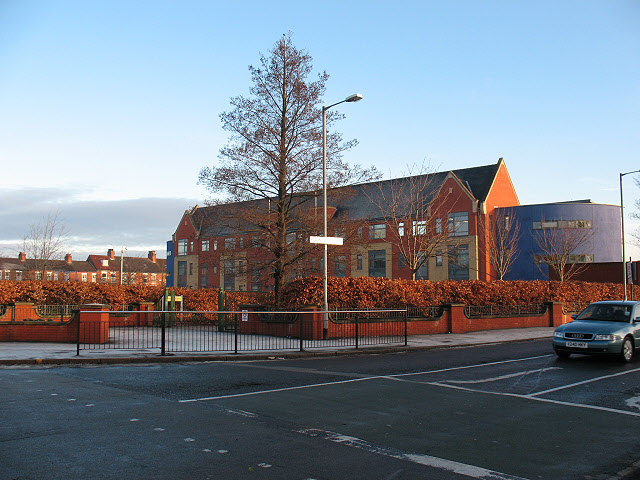

Location
- Beverley Road; Kingston upon Hull, East Riding of Yorkshire, HU3 1UR; England
- 53.755765°N 0.346649°W

Information
- Type: Adult and further education
- Established: September 2001
- Gender: Mixed
- Age: 16+
- Website: http://www.hcctraining.ac.uk/

Endeavour Learning and Skills Centre was a centre operated by Hull Training & Adult Education (formerly HCC Training) offering adult education and further education.

== History ==
=== Endeavour High School ===
Endeavour High School was created in 2001 from a merger of two existing schools: William Gee and Amy Johnson. In the same year the planning process began for a new school on the site of the former Kingston General Hospital, together with sports facilities on a former council depot site. It moved to a new £15 million site on Beverley Road in 2003, construction of the school was funded by cash raised by the sale of shares in Kingston Communications by the City Council. A sports facility north of the school in Temple Street, Stepney was also built.

In March 2004 Endeavour was placed in special measures, following an inspection by Ofsted. The school came out of special measures in December 2005. The school was placed in special measures again in 2009.

In the five years to 2009 the school's pass rate improved from 9% to 35%. In 2010 the school achieved its best ever GCSE results with 73% of students leaving with 5 A*–C and 99% of pupils leaving with at least 1 GCSE A*–G, or equivalent pass.

It was reported in 2011 that the council was considering closing the school and using the site for a work training centre. The school was put in special measures for a third time in 2012.

By 2013 the school had only 500 pupils out of a capacity of 1200, with the school population expected to fall further; in addition the school had failed to find a sponsor for it to gain Academy status; the low pupil numbers made the school financially unviable. Additionally, between 2005 and 2013 the City participated in the Building Schools for the Future (BSF) programme, refurbishing or rebuilding over 20 schools; and many other secondary schools had spare places (2011). As a result, Hull City Council began examining the case to begin the closure procedure.

In November 2013 Hull City Council announced a consultation on the possible closure of Endeavour High School. The council proposed to transfer pupils in years 7, 8 and 9 to different schools in September 2014, with full closure of the school commencing in August 2015. In March 2014 Hull City Council formally made the decision to close Endeavour High School as of summer 2015. The remaining 210 students continued with their GCSEs while the other 170 switched schools.

In June 2015 it saw the last of its 101 pupils leave, with the school officially closing on 31 August 2015.

=== Endeavour Learning and Skills Centre ===
In May 2014 HCC Training announced plans to offer adult education and training courses from the site, starting September 2014; as well as opening the sports facilities up for community use. As a result, adult education provision at a number of sites in the city ceased and transferred to the Beverley Road site in September 2014. After Endeavour High School closed in June 2015 the site was renamed Endeavour Learning and Skills Centre.
