= Sculcoates railway station =

Disused railway station in the East Riding of Yorkshire, England

Sculcoates
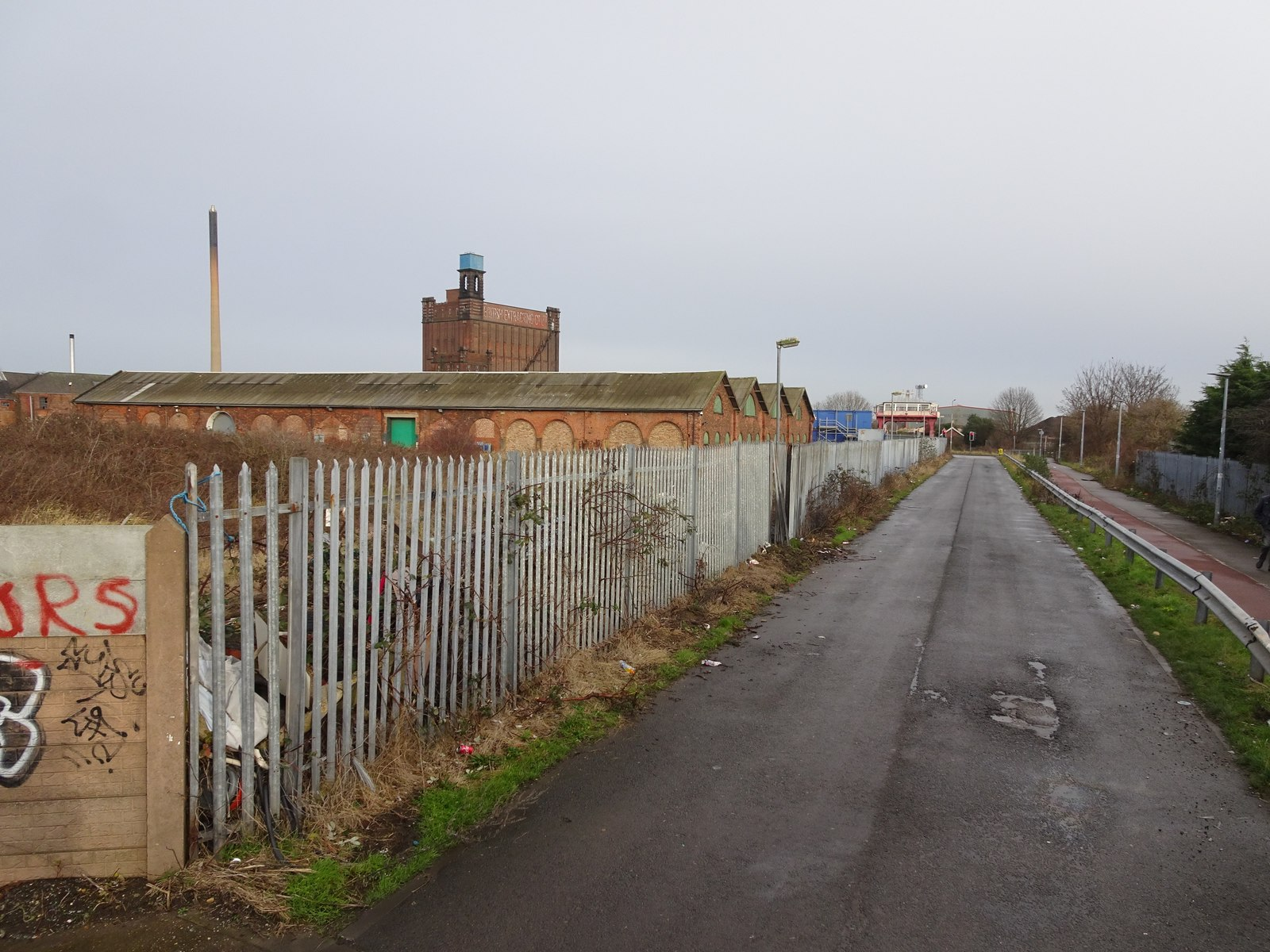
- The site of the station in 2018

General information
- Location: Hull, East Riding of Yorkshire; England
- Coordinates: 53.7587°N 0.3366°W
- Grid reference: TA097304
- Platforms: 2

Other information
- Status: Disused

History
- Original company: York and North Midland Railway
- Pre-grouping: North Eastern Railway

Key dates
- 1853: opened
- 1854: closed
- 1865: reopened
- 1912: closed
Location

Sculcoates railway station was a railway station on the North Eastern Railway's Victoria Dock Branch Line in Hull, East Riding of Yorkshire, England. It was first opened by the York and North Midland Railway on 1 June 1853 and closed in November 1854. It was reopened in August 1865, before closing permanently on 9 June 1912.

The station has been demolished but an associated railway goods shed remains in use by a road haulage firm.

Preceding station	Disused railways	Following station
Stepney	North Eastern Railway; Hull and Holderness Railway	Wilmington
Stepney	North Eastern Railway; Hull and Hornsea Railway	Wilmington
Stepney	North Eastern Railway; Victoria Dock Branch Line	Wilmington
