= Hull Botanic Gardens railway station =

Disused railway station in the East Riding of Yorkshire, England

Hull Botanic Gardens
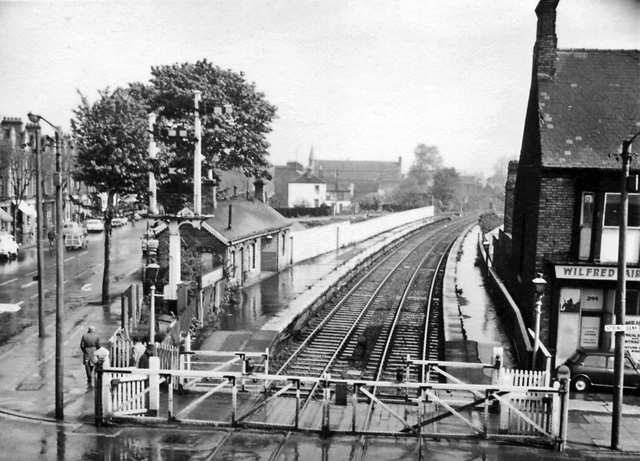
- Botanic Gardens in 1967

General information
- Location: Hull, East Riding of Yorkshire; England
- Coordinates: 53.7519°N 0.3606°W
- Grid reference: TA082296
- Platforms: 2

Other information
- Status: Disused

History
- Original company: North Eastern Railway
- Pre-grouping: North Eastern Railway
- Post-grouping: London and North Eastern Railway

Key dates
- 1 June 1853: Opened as Hull Cemetery
- November 1854: Closed
- September 1866: Reopened as Hull Cemetery Gates
- 1 November 1881: Renamed Hull Botanic Gardens
- 19 October 1964: Closed for passengers
- 4 October 1965: Closed for freight
Location

Hull Botanic Gardens railway station was an intermediate stop on the North Eastern Railway's Victoria Dock Branch Line in Hull, East Riding of Yorkshire, England.

== History ==
It was opened on 1 June 1853, by the North Eastern Railway, and was originally known as Hull Cemetery. It closed to passengers in November 1854, before being reopened and renamed Hull Cemetery Gates in September 1866. It was renamed Hull Botanic Gardens on 1 November 1881, and remained thus until final closure on 19 October 1964.

== Location ==
The station was at street level immediately to the north of a level crossing across Spring Bank, just east of the junction with Princes Avenue. The building was demolished in 1976. The site is now occupied by a public house, Pearson's (formerly The Old Zoological) and car park.

The station was named after the former Hull Botanical Gardens, which were located opposite the station until their closure in 1889. The gardens site is now the location of Hymers College.

Preceding station	Disused railways	Following station
Hull Paragon	North Eastern Railway; Hull and Holderness Railway	Stepney
Hull Paragon	North Eastern Railway; Hull and Hornsea Railway	Stepney
Hull Paragon	North Eastern Railway; Victoria Dock Branch Line	Stepney
