= Hull Botanical Gardens =

Botanical garden in Hull, England

Coordinates: 53.7479°N 0.3651°W

Hull Botanical Gardens were established in 1812 on a 5-acre (2.0 ha) site near what is now called Linnaeus Street, Hull, England.

In 1877 they moved to a 49-acre (20 ha) site in Spring Bank, Hull, but closed in 1889 due to financial difficulty. In 1893 the site became the location of Hymers College.

The Hull Botanic Gardens railway station is a disused railway station named after the nearby gardens.
