= HCC Training =

- Hull Training Logo

Location
- (Head Office) Endeavour Learning and Skills Centre; Hull, East Riding of Yorkshire, HU3 1UR; England
- Coordinates: 53.755765°N 0.346649°W

Information
- Type: Training Provider
- Established: 1980
- Ofsted: Reports
- Age: 14–16, 16–18, 18++
- Enrolment: 200
- Website: http://www.hcctraining.ac.uk

Hull City Council Training (HCC Training, informally known as Hull Training) is a further education and higher education training provider in Hull, England. It is a separately run department of Hull City Council.

Hull Training offers apprenticeships and professional development courses, and is registered with 12 awarding bodies. It consists of seven separate centres based around Hull, where each centre specialises in a different industry.

== Training Centres and Specialisations ==
Hull Training & Adult Education offers industry-specific training across its various locations, including:

- Endeavour Learning and Skills Centre
- Orchard Park Campus – Engineering, CNC
- Craven Park Training and Enterprise Centre – IT, Business Administration, Customer Service
- Youth Enterprise – Business Studies

=== Recognition and Standards ===
In 2010, Hull Training was rated as "Good" (Grade 2) by Ofsted, acknowledging the quality of education and training provided.

== Notable alumni ==
- Karl Turner (British politician), Member of Parliament.
