= Stepney railway station (East Riding of Yorkshire) =

Disused railway station in the East Riding of Yorkshire, England

Stepney
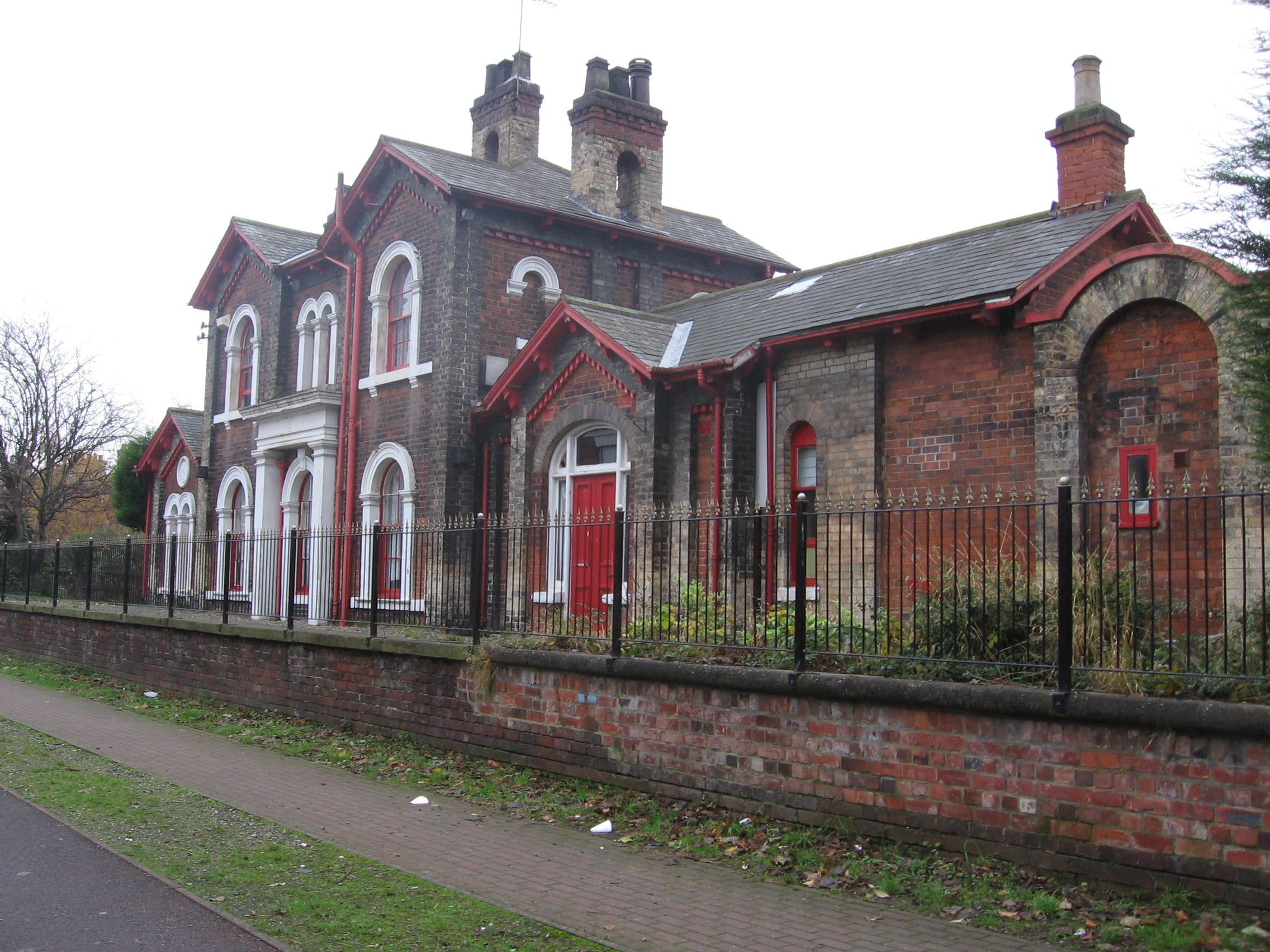
- Stepney railway station, Hull in 2007

General information
- Location: Hull, East Riding of Yorkshire; England
- Coordinates: 53.7570°N 0.3490°W
- Grid reference: TA089302
- Platforms: 2

Other information
- Status: Disused

History
- Original company: York and North Midland Railway
- Pre-grouping: North Eastern Railway
- Post-grouping: London and North Eastern Railway

Key dates
- 1848: Opened
- 1854: Closed
- 1864: Re-opened
- 1964: Closed
Location

Stepney railway station is a disused railway station on the York and North Midland Railway's Victoria Dock Branch Line in Stepney, Kingston upon Hull, East Riding of Yorkshire, England. It was first opened on 8 May 1848 and closed in November 1854. It was reopened on 1 June 1864, before closing permanently on 19 October 1964. Located on the Victoria Dock Branch Line which looped around the old part of the city, people could catch trains to stations on the lines serving the seaside resorts of Hornsea or Withernsea. Tickets were purchased in the small wooden building opposite the station building. Diesels took over from steam in January 1957. After the station closed, the lines through it were still used for goods trains until 1968. The few trains still travelling across Hull were diverted to the high level ex Hull and Barnsley Line which looped the city further north.

The station house is now a grade II listed building. An old map of the area shows coal and timber sidings to the south of the station building. The main station building is now used as a community and education centre.

Preceding station	Disused railways	Following station
Hull Botanic Gardens	North Eastern Railway; Hull and Holderness Railway	Sculcoates
Hull Botanic Gardens	North Eastern Railway; Hull and Hornsea Railway	Sculcoates
Hull Botanic Gardens	North Eastern Railway; Victoria Dock Branch Line	Sculcoates
