= Kingston General Hospital, Kingston upon Hull =

Hospital in Kingston upon Hull, East Riding of Yorkshire, England

Kingston General Hospital
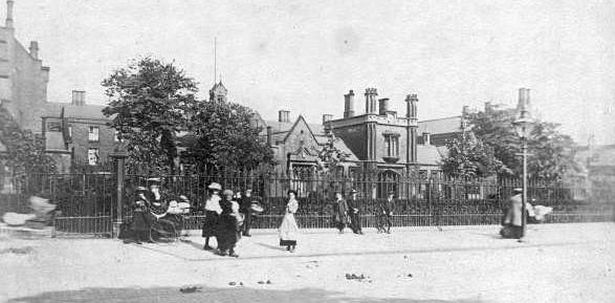
- Sculcoates Union Workhouse from Beverley Road (c. 1913)

- Shown in the East Riding of Yorkshire

Geography
- Location: Kingston upon Hull, East Riding of Yorkshire, England
- Coordinates: 53.755765°N 0.346649°W

Organisation
- Care system: NHS
- Type: District General

Services
- Emergency department: Yes

History
- Founded: 1844
- Closed: 2000

Links
- Lists: Hospitals in England

Kingston General Hospital was an acute general hospital in Kingston upon Hull, England.

== History ==
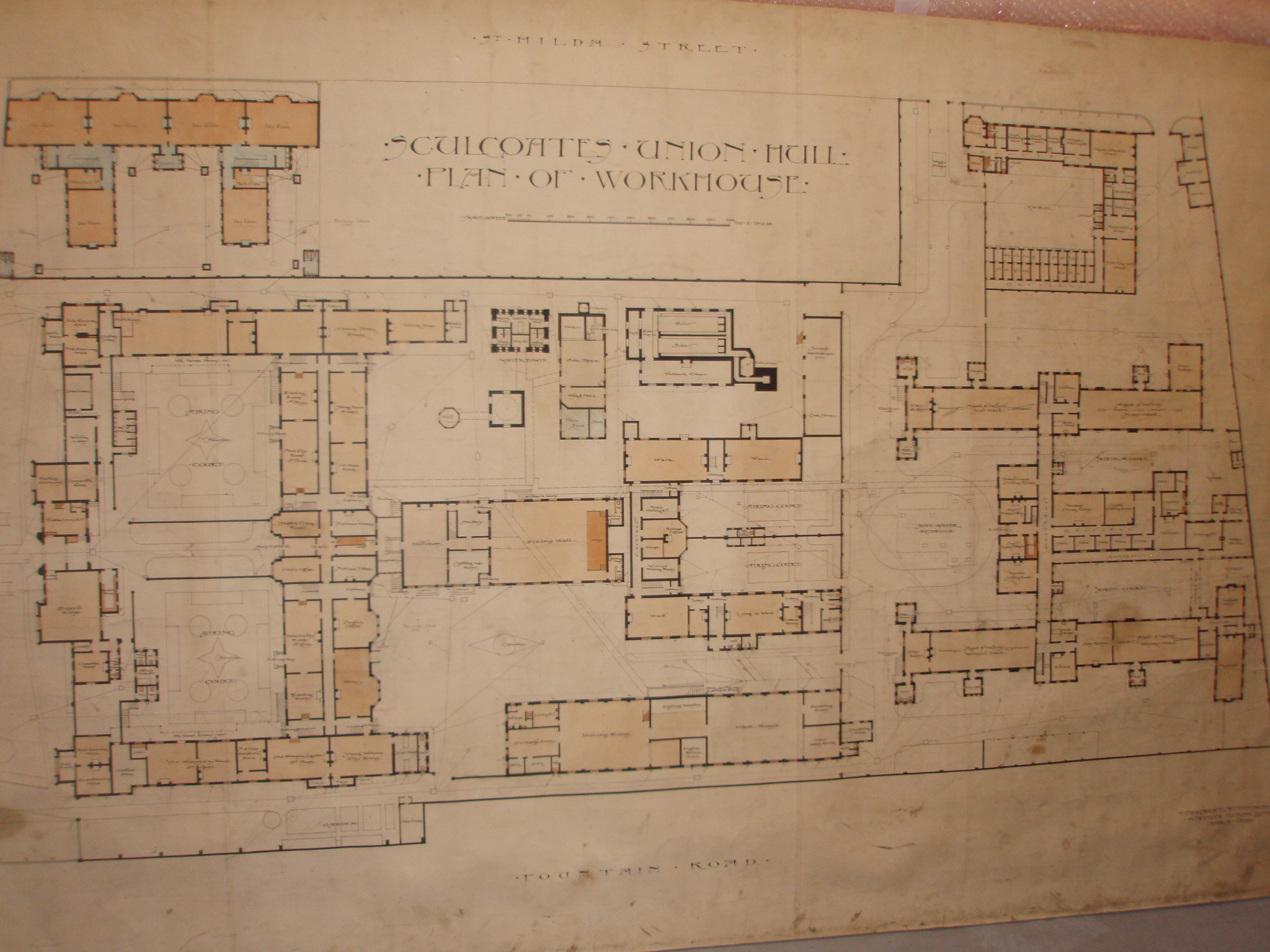
Sculcoates Workhouse plan

The Sculcoates Union Workhouse was built for the Poor law union of Sculcoates in 1844. The building was mostly influenced by the Tudor architectural style in red brick with stone dressings, and had accommodation for 500 paupers. The cost of the building was £11,000. The architect was Henry Francis Lockwood. The front of the building (facing Beverley Road) was 220 feet (67 m) and was particularly ornamented. In the 1860s a fever ward (later an infirmary) was constructed at the rear of the building. The workhouse was extended in 1889 making space for 800. The Sculcoates Union also built homes in Hessle in 1897 for children. It was taken over by Hull Corporation as the Beverley Road Institution in 1930.

The workhouse joined the National Health Service with 310 beds as Kingston General Hospital in 1948. The number of beds was increased to 464 in 1963 after extensive reconstruction. The front range of the workhouse was demolished to make way for a day hospital in the 1970s. The hospital closed in 2000 and the rest of the building was demolished to allow the construction of Endeavour High School in 2001.
