= Victoria Dock branch line =

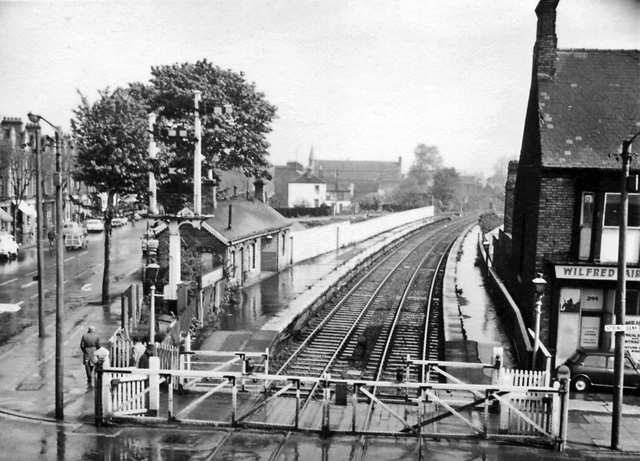
Botanic Gardens Railway Station, Hull (1967)

The Victoria Dock branch line was a branch line within the city of Kingston upon Hull that connected the Hull and Hornsea Railway to the east and the York and North Midland Railway and Hull and Selby Railway to the west, terminating at Victoria Dock Station.

== History ==
Before 1850, the city of Kingston upon Hull had one dock area to the west of the River Hull. This was served by the York and North Midland Railway by the goods station on Railway Street. The new Victoria Docks were opened in 1850 to the east of the river where Victoria Park is now located. Victoria Station and a connecting branch line was built to connect the new docks to the rest of the rail network. Having received the necessary permission in 1852, the line was opened for freight traffic on 16 May 1853 and for passenger traffic on 1 June 1853. Passenger traffic ceased a year later due to lack of numbers.

Victoria Station was the terminus for the Hull and Holderness Railway when it opened and Hull and Hornsea Railway trains terminated at Wilmington until both lines used the Victoria Branch Line to run all the way to Paragon Station. In 1964 those two lines closed and forced the closure of the intermediate stations that had been re-opened after its initial closure. Freight traffic continued to run the Victoria Docks until 1968. The new Ring Road meant that the trackbed from Wilmington to Southcoates was removed. There is no trace now of the Victoria Station.

== Route ==
The semi-circular line ran for a little over three miles from the junction of the Hull and Selby line near Anlaby Road northwards. As the line was at ground level, it was necessary to have level crossings across major roads. Travelling east from the Junction the line had stations at Hull Botanic Gardens, Stepney, Sculcoates, Wilmington and Southcoates before terminating at Victoria Docks. The line crossed Spring Bank, Park Street, Beverley Road, Wincolmlee, Stoneferry Lane, Dansom Lane, Holderness Road and finally Hedon Road. The latter crossing was originally on the level, but around 1900 the road was lowered and a railway bridge was erected.
