= Princess Royal Hospital, Kingston upon Hull =

Hospital in Kingston upon Hull, East Riding of Yorkshire, England

Princess Royal Hospital
- Hull and East Yorkshire Hospitals NHS Trust
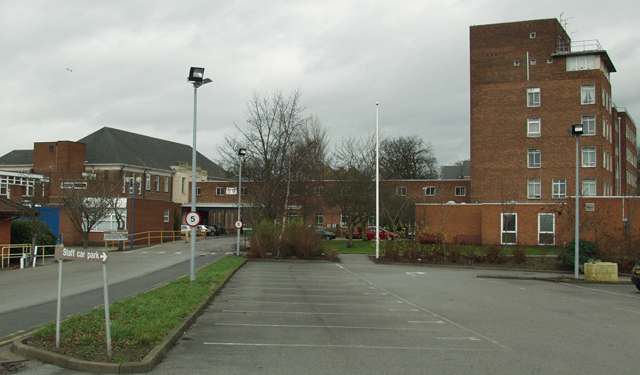
- Princess Royal Hospital

- Shown in the East Riding of Yorkshire

Geography
- Location: Kingston upon Hull, East Riding of Yorkshire, England
- Coordinates: 53.7768°N 0.2795°W

Organisation
- Care system: NHS

Services
- Emergency department: No

History
- Founded: 1931
- Closed: 2008

Links
- Lists: Hospitals in England

The Princess Royal Hospital, Kingston upon Hull was an acute general hospital in Kingston upon Hull, England.

== History ==
The hospital was established as the Sutton Annexe to the Hull Royal Infirmary on a site donated by Sir Philip Reckitt, chairman of Reckitt and Sons, and was built between 1928 and 1931. In 1963 the hospital had 208 beds. After services transferred to the Castle Hill Hospital, the Princess Royal Hospital closed in summer 2008. It was demolished in spring 2012.
