= Beverley Road =

Road in Kingston upon Hull, England

- Bev Road (local)
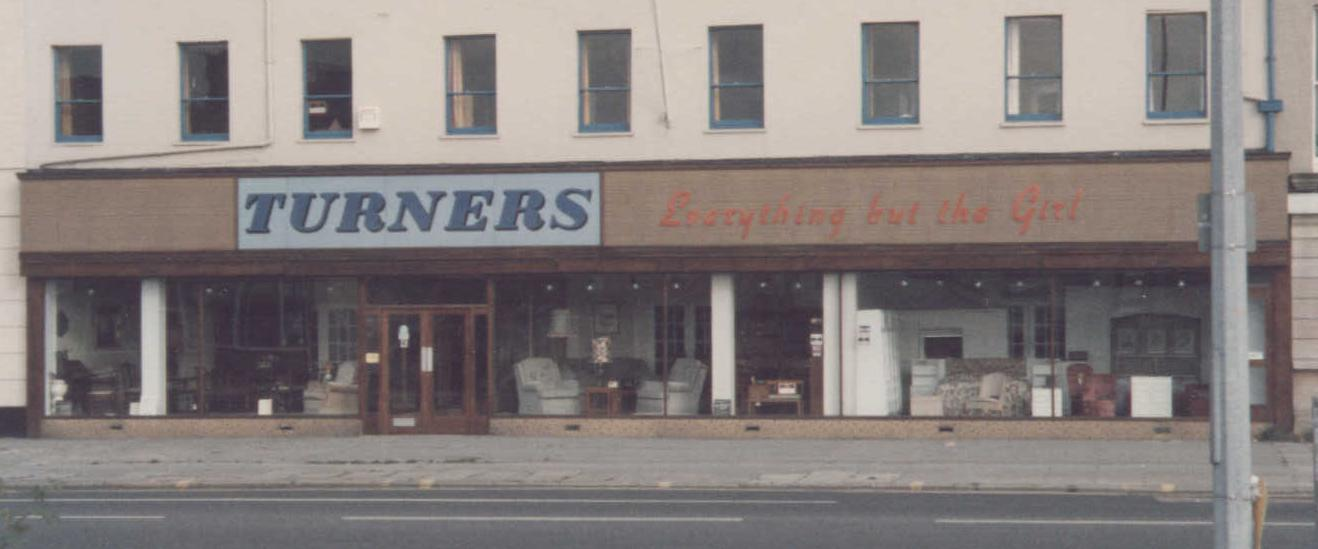
- Turners bed shop on Beverley Road, with the Everything but the Girl slogan (1985)

- Location within East Riding of Yorkshire
- Length: 4 mi (6.4 km); Approximate length from Dunswell to city centre. Conservation area is 1.29 miles (2.08 km)
- Area: 74 acres (30 ha) (Conservation area)
- Location: Kingston upon Hull; Dunswell; East Riding of Yorkshire
- Coordinates: 53.77063°N 0.35448°W
- North end: Dunswell Lane; Plaxton Bridge Road
- South end: Ferensway; Freetown Way; Spring Bank

Beverley Road (known in local parlance as Bev Road) is one of several major roads that run out of the city of Hull in the East Riding of Yorkshire, England. The road is noted for being a major arterial route into, and out of Hull. It also known for its student population and being the location of a shop (Turners), whose slogan was used by the pop band, Everything But the Girl. In 1994, just over 1-mile (1.6 km) of the road was designated as a conservation area.

== History ==
Beverley Road was in existence by 1305, when King Edward I built the radial routes into the port of Hull to effect free trade. The road was at least 60-foot (18 m) wide and connected with the Beverley Gate on Whitefriargate, in the Old Town of Hull. Beverley Road now runs North from Hull city centre, at the junction of Ferensway, Freetown Way and Spring Bank, and carries the designation of A1079. Upon leaving the city boundaries, Beverley Road continues north towards the town of Beverley becoming the A1174. After passing through the village of Dunswell it becomes Hull Road. Ferensway was opened in 1931 (named after T. R. Ferens, a Hull benefactor), and provide access from the bottom of Beverley Road to Hull Paragon railway station.

A horse tramway was opened on the road in 1875. It extended from Prospect Place all the way to the junction with Clough Road, in the Newland area. The junction of Clough Road (and opposite, Cottingham Road), was designated as the northern limit of the Beverley Road conservation area in 1994. The conservation area extends from its southern edge at Norfolk Street northwards for 1.29 miles (2.08 km), and covers 74 acres (30 ha).

Beverley Road is home to a significant proportion of Hull's student community, given its proximity to the University of Hull, and the former Humberside campus of the University of Lincoln. Its shopping and nightlife is comparable to thoroughfares in neighbouring cities such as Sheffield's Ecclesall Road and Leeds' Headingley. It has a high number of pubs and other businesses catering for both the student and local communities.

In parts, it is lined with large pre-war housing, but extensive bombing during the Second World War destroyed many such buildings. One building, the National Picture Theatre, is till extant and was Grade II listed in January 2007. Endeavour Learning and Skills Centre was on Beverley Road, on the site of the former Kingston General Hospital. In March 2021, plans were drawn up for Hull Trinity House Academy to relocate from its site in Charlotte Street Mews to the former Endeavour Learning and Skills Centre site. Work to transform the site began in August 2022 with a completion ahead of the move for the start of the academic year in September 2023.

Many major national and international chains have businesses along the length of Beverley Road including pub chains such as Wetherspoons, Hogshead, and Scream, as have high street chains like Tesco, Sainsbury's at Jacksons (now Sainsbury's Local), and Cooplands. Beverley Road has many food shops catering for the cosmopolitan local community, including Arabic, Indian, Italian, and Kurdish. The road has several outlets serving Polish cuisine for the town's Polish community, including restaurants, a takeaway, a bakery, and Polish shops.

Beverley Road Baths was opened in 1905, and underwent a £3.75 million refurbishment from June 2020 until reopening in August 2021. The baths are a Grade II Listed building.

The pop duo Everything But the Girl, Ben Watt and Tracey Thorn, took their band name from Turners furniture shop at 34–38 Beverley Road, between Norfolk Street and College Street. The slogan was emblazoned on the shop front sign.

It is officially known as Beverley High Road, north of Cottingham Road. Whilst within the Hull boundaries, Beverley Road runs through the parliamentary constituency of Hull North.

== See also ==
- Closed cinemas in Kingston upon Hull
