= British Rail Class 123 =

Class of four-car diesel multiple units

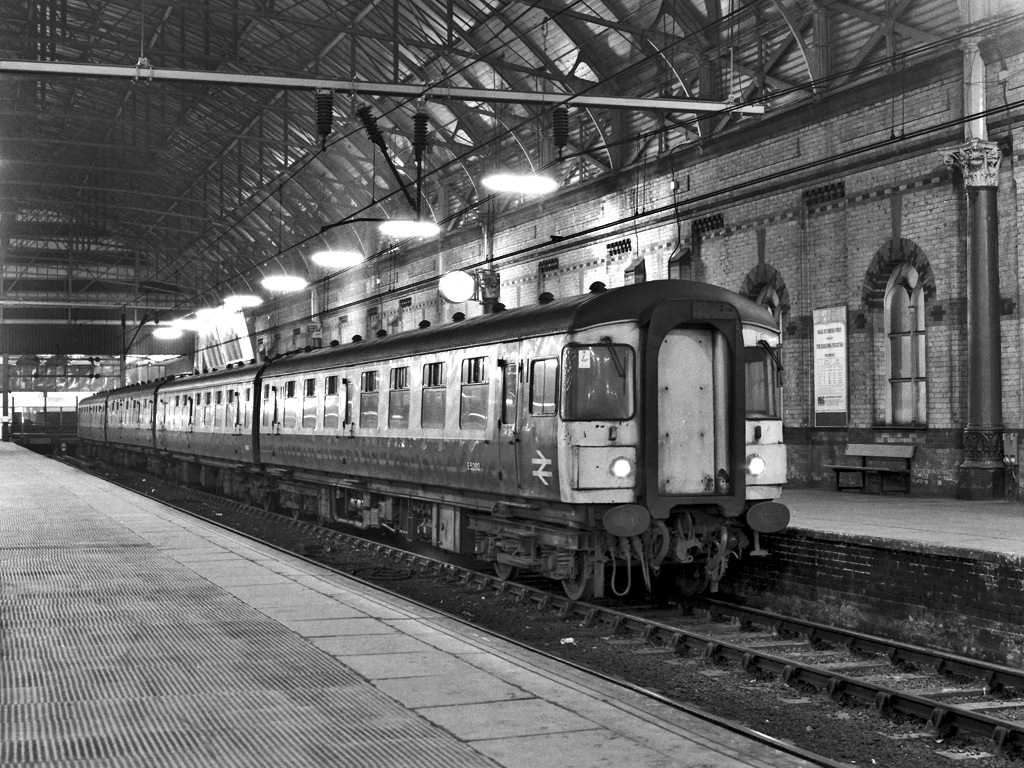
- A mixed four car DMU stands at Manchester Piccadilly in 1984. The two driving coaches are from a class 123 and the middle coaches are from class 124 units.
- In service: 1963–1984
- Manufacturer: Swindon Works
- Family name: First generation
- Replaced: Steam locomotives and carriages
- Scrapped: 1984–1987
- Number built: 40 (Ten 4-car units)
- Number scrapped: All
- Formation: DMBSL-TCK-TSL[RB]-DMSK
- Capacity: 24 First class, 176 Second class seats (units with buffet 32 second class less)
- Operator: British Rail
- Depots: BG Hull Botanic Gardens; LA Laira
- Lines served: Western Region; Eastern Region

Specifications
- Car body construction: Steel
- Car length: 64 ft 11 1/4 in (19.793 m)
- Width: 9 ft 3 in (2.82 m)
- Height: 12 ft 9 1/2 in (3.899 m)
- Maximum speed: 70 mph (113 km/h)
- Weight: 146.75 long tons (149.10 t; 164.36 short tons)
- Prime movers: 230 hp (172 kW), 2 per power car
- Power output: 920 hp (686 kW)
- Bogies: B4
- Multiple working: Blue Square
- Track gauge: 4 ft 8 1/2 in (1,435 mm)

The British Rail Class 123 was a design of diesel multiple unit built for British Rail in 1963. They were the last first-generation DMUs built for British Railways and were built at Swindon Works. Ten of the four-car sets were built and introduced in 1963. The units bear a visible similarity to the British Rail Class 309; however, there is no 'relation' here as the two types were built by different manufacturers for different markets.

== Operational history ==
They were originally intended for use on services from the South Coast to Wales, but only briefly used on services from Portsmouth to Cardiff and Bristol. When introduced they were concentrated on services between Swansea, Cardiff, Birmingham, Derby and Crewe and between Cardiff and Bristol. While still in their original green livery the units were trialled on services between Plymouth and Penzance on the Cornish Main Line as an alternative to loco-hauled services.
