= Springhead engine shed =

Coordinates: 53.748931°N 0.408321°W

Springhead engine shed was an engine shed located in the City of Kingston upon Hull in Yorkshire, England and was opened by the Hull and Barnsley Railway (HBR) in 1885. The shed was closed by British Railways in July 1961 and subsequently demolished.

== Early days (1885–1922) ==
The Hull and Barnsley Railway began operation in July 1885 and of its 42 steam locomotives 30 were based at Springhead engine shed which was adjacent to the works for the new line. Its allocation was initially 2-4-0 and 0-6-0 tender engines and the shed was located some 3.75 miles west of Hull City Centre. It was built as a straight shed with eight roads and as traffic increased it was extended in 1890, 1897 and 1906 to a total of 380 feet in length. As locomotives became more powerful a new 55 foot turntable was provided in 1906 and a water softening plant in 1910. The majority of the traffic worked by the shed was coal although some passenger trains were operated.

The Hull and Barnsley Railway was absorbed by the North Eastern Railway (NER) at the end of March 1922. A number of Hull and Barnsley Railway locomotives were scrapped in the following months and NER locomotives replaced them.

== London and North Eastern Railway (1923–1947) ==
Following the Railways Act 1921 the NER amalgamated with several other railways to create the London and North Eastern Railway (LNER) on 1 January 1923. At this time, a total of 120 engines were allocated to the shed consisting of 99 HBR and 21 NER locomotives. The table below shows the breakdown by class and wheel arrangement.

Class (LNER classification)	Wheel Arrangement	Number allocated
D22	4-4-0	2
D24	4-4-0	5
F8	0-6-0	1
J23	0-6-0	34
J25	0-6-0	2
J28	0-6-0	19
J75	0-6-0T	10
J80	0-6-0T	3
N8	0-6-2T	1
N9	0-6-2T	4
N11	0-6-2T	4
N12	0-6-2T	1
N13	0-6-2T	8
Q5	0-8-0	4
Q6	0-8-0	7
Q10	0-8-0	15

The LNER closed the HBR's Hull Cannon Street railway station in July 1924 which saw the transfer of the D22 and D24 4-4-0 passenger engines to Hull Botanic Gardens Engine Shed.

From 1925 the LNER started transferring former Class O4 2-8-0 engines to operate the coal trains on the HBR and by 1931 Springhead had an allocation of 22 of these engines generally displacing smaller HBR engines usually for scrap. Recession in the 1930s saw locomotive numbers decline and by 1939 there was no more than a quarter of the 1923 total. The Second World War saw these engines transferred away as the threat from German naval forces in the North Sea rendered coal export traffic negligible. Additionally being a port Hull was a prime target or air raids, and it was felt these engines could be better employed elsewhere and at less risk. Despite Hull suffering several air raids in the Blitz no bombs hit the engine shed.

== British Railways (1948–1961) ==
Under the British Railways shed numbering scheme Springhead (and Alexandra Dock) were allocated the code 53C.

The gradual run down of the shed continued after nationalisation in 1948 and by 1955 none of the eight roads had a roof. However, in the run up to dieselisation four of the roads were temporarily refurbished whilst Hull Botanic Gardens engine shed was undergoing a significant rebuild.

Some Class 105 and Class 108 DMUs were allocated briefly to Springhead during this time before transfer to Botanic Gardens.

Springhead officially closed to steam on 15 December 1958 with the remaining engines transferring to Dairycoates engine shed although the allocation physically moved on 30 November.

The final allocation of 27 consisted of 25 steam and two diesel locomotives:

Class (LNER classification)	Wheel Arrangement	Number allocated	Remarks
J25	0-6-0	2	
J73	0-6-0T	2	
O7	2-8-0	8	
WD	2-8-0	10	Former War Department locos
BR class 3	2-6-0	2	
LMS Class 2	2-6-0	1	
BR Class 08	0-6-0DM	2	Diesel Shunters

The site continued in its role maintaining local Diesel Multiple Units and locomotives until July 1961 when the newly refurbished Botanic Gardens was available. Closure and demolition of the site followed soon after and a housing estate now occupies the site.
