= Botanic Gardens TMD =

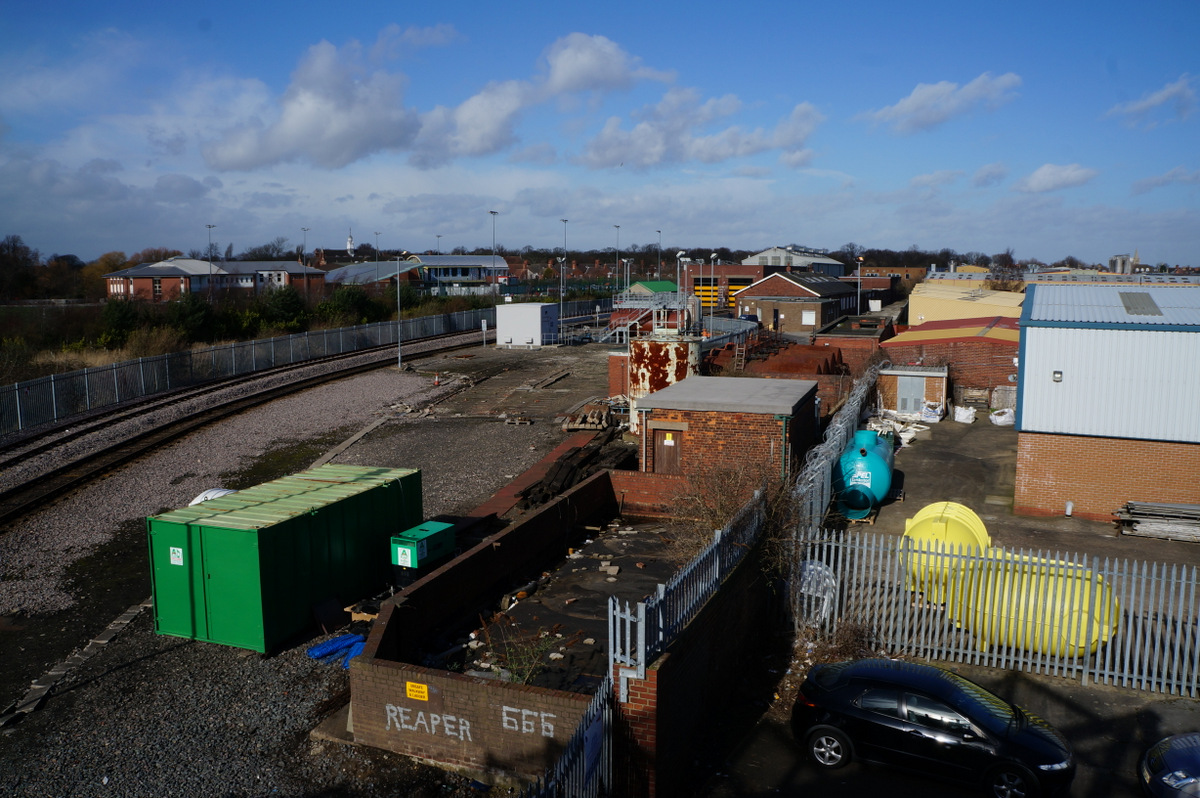
- Botanic Gardens rail depot, c. 2017
- Interactive map of Botanic Gardens TMD

Location
- Location: Kingston upon Hull, England
- Coordinates: 53.7484°N 0.3614°W
- OS grid: TA081292

Characteristics
- Operator: Northern Trains
- Depot code: BG (1973–)
- Type: Steam, Diesel, DMU

History
- Opened: 1901
- Original: NER
- Pre-grouping: LNER
- BR region: North Eastern region until 1967 then Eastern Region
- Former depot code: 53B (1948–1960); 50C (1960–1973)

Botanic Gardens TMD is a traction maintenance depot in Kingston upon Hull in Yorkshire, England. As built it was one of the principal steam engine sheds in the Hull area, Botanic Gardens was the one closest to the main Hull Paragon station and its locomotives were responsible for working passenger services in the area. This entry also covers the engine sheds in the Paragon area that preceded Botanic Gardens.

== Earlier engine sheds (1848–1901) ==
Paragon station opened in May 1848 replacing an earlier terminus at Manor House although this continued as a railway station until 1854. This station had workshops and an engine shed belonging to the Hull and Selby Railway.

The new station at Paragon was provided with a three road engine shed with each road being approximately 125 feet long. A 45-foot diameter turntable was provided to enable arriving locomotives to be turned. These facilities were located on the north side of the station.

By the late 1850s the shed was struggling to cope with traffic levels and an additional shed was authorised in 1865 and opened for traffic in 1867. This was a square covered roundhouse with a turntable and 20 radiating roads. The shed was located just south of St Stephens Square.

Towards the end of the century, passenger traffic was still growing and the NER decided to add two platforms to the north side of the station. Replacement facilities were provided at Botanic Gardens which opened in 1901. The original shed was demolished in 1901 to make way for the new platforms but whether the 1867 shed was demolished at this time is not known (the land was not required for the expansion of the station).

== Botanic Gardens opens (1901–1923) ==
With the growth of Hull and associated rail traffic in the 1890s, the NER wished to extend Hull Paragon Station and to do that it wanted to add more platforms where the current sheds were located on the north side. Preparation of the site began in 1898 and the entrance lines were actually approved in that year. Another factor driving the new depot was the increase in locomotive sizes from short 2-4-0 locomotives to longer 4-4-0 and 4-6-0 classes.

Named after the closed (in 1887) Hull Botanical Gardens, the shed had three turntables – one was provided at the Paragon station end for visiting locomotives to be turned quickly for return trips. The large shed building consisted of two separate 55-foot (17 m) turntables with radiating stabling roads.

Generally, Botanic Gardens locomotives worked as far afield as Sheffield Victoria, Doncaster, York, Scarborough, Leeds and the branches to Hornsea and Withernsea.

== London and North Eastern Railway (1923–1947) ==
Following the Railways Act 1921 the NER became part of the London and North Eastern Railway (LNER) on 1 January 1923. The table below shows the allocated locomotives on that date – all locomotives were of NER origin.

Class (LNER classification)	Wheel Arrangement	Number allocated	Remarks
D17/1	4-4-0	10	
D19	4-4-0	1	This was a unique one off locomotive NER Class 3CC.
D20	4-4-0	5	
D22	4-4-0	11	
D23	4-4-0	11	
F8	2-4-2T	3	Branch line locomotives
G5	0-4-4T	4	Branch line locomotives
G6	0-4-4T	2	Branch line locomotives
X2	2-2-4T	1	BTP class dating from 1874 – used on special duties such as hauling the local inspection saloon.

Following the closure of the former Hull and Barnsley Railway Hull Cannon Street station in 1925, Botanic Gardens received an allocation of 4-4-0 locomotives from Springhead engine shed (Hull), thus concentrating all passenger working engines on one site. These locomotives continued to work services over the HBR.

In 1927 the shed received its first allocation of Sentinel steam rail cars and locally named examples included Valiant, Tally-Ho and Liberty.

In 1932 a concrete coaling bunker was added to the depot improving the previous coaling facilities.

In October 1946 the association with the LNER rail cars ended (the year before all of these vehicles were withdrawn).

== British Railways (1948–1996) ==
Following nationalisation the shed became part of the North Eastern region of British Railways, and under the British Railways shed numbering scheme, Botanic Gardens (Hull) was allocated the code 53B until 1960 and then after that 50B as part of York district.

During 1955 one of the 55-foot turntables was replaced by a 60-foot (18 m) version and years later in 2005 this was bought by the South Devon Railway (heritage railway) for future use at Buckfastleigh railway station.

During 1956/57 the shed was comprehensively rebuilt of the coming dieselisation of services. Number 1 shed was completely re-roofed whilst number 2 shed had its turntable removed and was reconfigured for Diesel Multiple Unit (DMU) operation. The new shed officially re-opened on 13 June 1959, at which point its last steam locomotives were transferred to Dairycoates engine shed.

Following the abolition of the North Eastern region in 1967 the depot became part of British Railways Eastern Region.

Following the closure of Dairycoates engine shed in 1970, its remaining allocation was transferred to Botanic Gardens although the former engine shed site at Hull Alexandra Dock was still used for stabling shunting locomotives employed in the docks.

With the introduction of the British Rail TOPS (Total Operations Planning System) in 1973, Botanic Gardens locomotives and multiple units were allocated the code BG. 1973 also saw the closure of Goole engine shed and the transfer of its five remaining Class 03 shunters to Botanic Gardens.

Following changes to passenger traffic – the replacement of locomotive hauled services and loss of parcels and newspaper traffic, the remaining Class 03 shunters were transferred away from Hull in 1982. This was also the year that rail traffic to Alexandra Dock ceased. The same year the BR regions were disbanded and the depot became part of the Provincial sector (later Regional Railways).

=== DMU allocations at Botanic Gardens ===
British Rail Class 105 units were allocated to the depot from November 1958 having been transferred from Springhead which was acting as the local DMU depot whilst Botanic Gardens was being built. These operated the local Hornsea and Withernsea branches and on bank holidays it was not unknown for eight-car formations to be used on these lines. They were employed on other East Yorkshire lines from the late 1950s until the early 1980s.

Similarly British Rail Class 101 Metropolitan Cammell Units were allocated to Springhead and thence Botanic Gardens in the late 1950s. They were still allocated to the shed in the mid 1980s where some four-car sets were reduced to three-cars."

Derby works built two-car British Rail Class 108 units were also allocated to Springhead and then Botanic Gardens in 1958 although all units had been transferred away by 1960. Three- and four-car Class 108 units were also allocated to the area working the Hull to York and Hull to Scarborough routes. They remained in service locally until the 1980s.

The Trans-Pennine Class 124 DMUs were allocated to the depot for almost their whole existence and employed on services from Hull to Doncaster, Sheffield, Manchester and Leeds. Introduced in 1960 they were reformed in 1979 with the addition of Class 123 units from the Western Region for a new timetable that year. The units were withdrawn in 1984.

=== Downgrade to fuelling point ===
On 19 January 1987, the shed was reduced to a fuelling point and on paper its remaining allocation of Class 08 shunters was allocated to York. Around this time other locomotive classes usually stabled at the depot included Classes 31, 37 and 47 most of which would have worked freight into the area.

== The privatisation era (1996–present) ==
Following privatisation Arriva Trains Northern ran the depot between 1997 and 2004 after which the site was operated by Northern Rail until April 2016.

The site continued to be active with minor scheduled maintenance, stabling, fuelling, internal and external cleaning of Arriva Rail North, TransPennine Express and Hull Trains units undertaken. It was operated by Arriva Rail North until that franchise was handed to the Government's operator of last resort who established Northern Trains to take over the operation on 1 March 2020.

=== Return to full TMD status ===
In March 2021, Northern Trains announced that they were to invest £3.5 million to increase the capacity and enhance the facilities at Botanic Gardens so that the depot could become home to operator's Class 170 and Class 155 units. These works involved constructing new buildings, installing new equipment and building additional infrastructure to increase capacity at the site, and was part of a plan to relieve pressure on Neville Hill TMD.

The work to return the depot to full TMD status was completed in December 2022.
