= Gipsyville =

Suburb of Kingston upon Hull in the East Riding of Yorkshire, England

Coordinates: 53.7313°N 0.3881°W

Gipsyville is a western suburb of Kingston upon Hull, in the East Riding of Yorkshire, England.

Gipsyville was established at the beginning of the 20th century as a housing and factory development and derives its name from a black lead product "Gipsy Black Metal Polish" that was produced locally at the Hargreaves & Bros company works. During the interwar period a large council estate of over 1,000 dwellings was built to the north of the original development.

== Geography ==
Gipsyville is a western suburb of Kingston upon Hull, approximately halfway between Hull and Hessle town centres near the Hessle Road / Askew Avenue junction (see A1166 road). Its boundaries are roughly the railway lines of the Hull and Selby Railway and Hull Docks Branch to the south and east respectively; and Pickering Park to the west. To the north are the suburbs of Anlaby Common, and East Ella.

Most of the area lies in the Pickering ward of Hull City Council, the remainder in the western part of Newington ward. As of 2012 the area has a primary school, Francis Askew, catering for 270 children. A public services centre, the 'Gipsyville Multipurpose Centre' provides library, health and other community services.

Shopping facilities are centred on the radial Hessle Road. The southern part of Gipsyville includes an industrial area, known as Dairycoates Industrial Estate, the area known as Dairycoates is adjacent to the east.

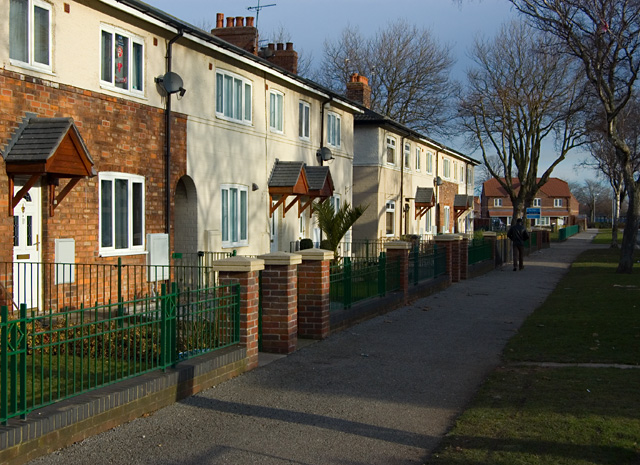
Interwar council housing

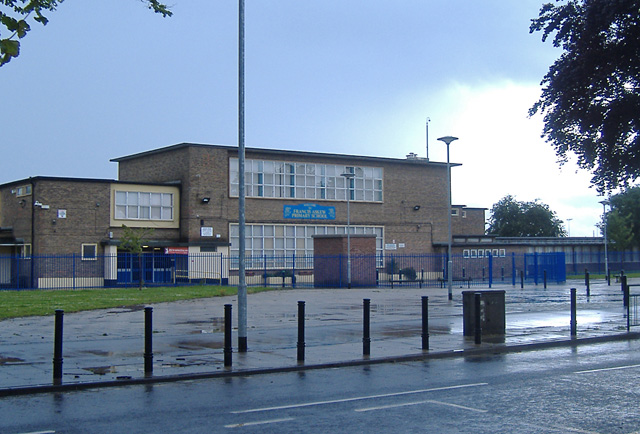
Francis Askew Primary School

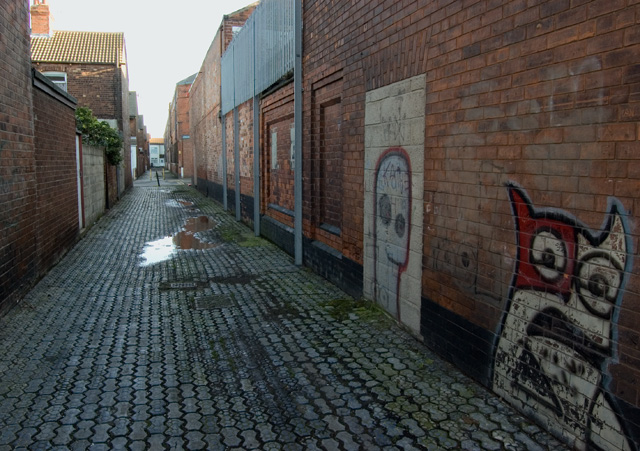
Tenfoot between pre-First World War housing and works with scoria block paving

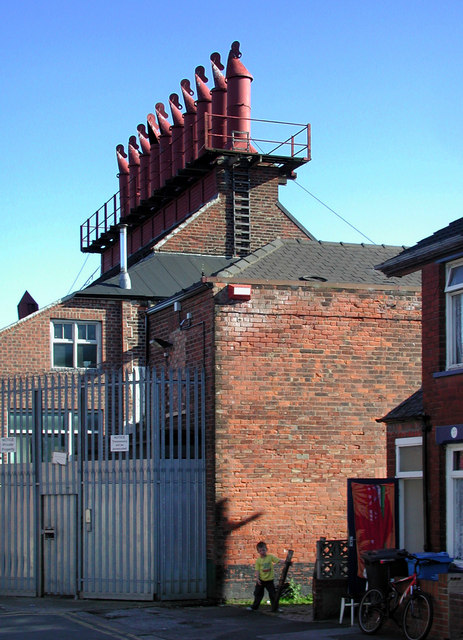
Smokehouse, end of Essex Street

== History ==
The land on which the original Gipsyville development took place was called Hessle Great Ings (see Ings), and was historically within the parish of Hessle. Enclosure and drainage of the land in the area was brought about by the Hull Drainage Act 1792 (32 Geo. 3. c. 109). The road from Hull to Hessle was turnpiked in 1825, and the Hull and Selby Railway constructed south of the road opened in 1840. The north south running Bridlington branch of the Hull and Selby, and a branch of the Hull and Barnsley Railway were opened in 1846 and 1885 respectively. (Note: The Hull and Barnsley branch was known as the Neptune Street branch, see Hull and Barnsley Railway) At the end of the 19th century the area contained no housing or other development, excluding the Hessle Road and railways; to the east the urban growth of Hull (Newington and Dairycoates areas) had reached the boundary formed by the north south railway branches.

At the turn of the 20th century industrial and housing development began – F. Atkins & Co. opened a canister works, (Note: On 1:2500 and 1:10560 Ordnance survey maps from 1920s to 1960s labelled as "Dairycoates works") and Hargreaves Bros. & Co. established a black lead factory in 1906. (Note: On 1:2500 and 1:10560 Ordnance survey maps from 1920s to 1960s labelled as "Gipsyville works") Terraced housing was constructed in the same period, running north south on the south side of Hessle Road; the streets were named after English counties.

The area took its name from a product produced by Hargreaves, "Gipsy Black Metal Polish". In 1911 Pickering Park opened to the north-west, by which time the population of the estate was somewhere between 2,000 and 3,000. Hargreaves became insolvent in 1922 and was taken over by competitor Reckitt and Sons in 1922, who closed the works. (Note: Reckitt and Sons were unable to find a use or buyer for the works and they were unused up to 1941 when some production was shifted to the works after bombing during the Hull Blitz damaged their Kingston Works (Dansom lane).)

Housing development took place on the north side of Hessle Road in the first half of the 20th century. During the interwar period, stimulated by the Addison Act, the council built over 10,000 homes, 1,380 of which were constructed in Gipsyville; a Garden city movement influenced council estate of semi-detached and terraced houses with gardens, on tree lined main roads was developed to the east of Pickering Park, around Askew Avenue. Buildings built on the south side of Hessle Road included some more architecturally distinctive structures; the 1926 Queen Anne influenced "Gipsyville tavern" (later "the Dover Sole") is now a locally listed building. Fish curing works (smokehouses) were established in the industrial part of Gipsyville.

Francis Askew school was established in 1925, (Note: Named after the education committee chairman.) initially as a temporary infant and junior school – it expanded during the mid 20th century to include a senior school (Frances Askew High) of over 600 students by the 1960s. A public library was established in 1956. (Note: As of 2013 the Library building functions as the 'Gipsyville multipurpose centre' providing multiple public services.)

In 1962 the level crossing (Hessle Road (Dairycoates) level crossing) at the eastern edge of the area was replaced with a road flyover (the "Hessle Road flyover" or "Dairycoates flyover") at a cost of over £800,000 to reduce road congestion. Nearly £500,000 was contributed by the government, and nearly £140,000 by the BTC. (Note: By the 1990s the flyover was affected by Concrete degradation due to reinforcement corrosion and was reinforced by the conversion of the voids in the approaches into arches. The main concrete deck span has also required reinforcement, strengthening work was carried out in the late 2000s.)

In 1967 a large food processing factory (manufacturing the "Birds Eye" brand) was opened to the west of the original pre-war housing development, on the western part of a site used as allotments. The Dairycoates Industrial estate was developed from 1980 onwards, constructed to the south and east of the original early 1900s black lead, and canister works.

In the late 1990s Hull City Council became involved in a controversial Public Private Partnership scheme with Keepmoat to refurbish, and demolish and redevelop 1,200 council houses in the area. The scheme failed to generate significant funds for the council, and the council was accused of ignoring the wishes of the Gipsyville residents.

The "Birds Eye" factory was closed in 2007 with a loss of around 500 permanent jobs; the company opened a pea processing factory on the nearby Brighton Street industrial estate (Dairycoates) in 2007.

An ambulance station was opened in 2009 near to the Hessle Road flyover.

== Notable people ==
- Dean Windass, football player
- Steve Lee, songwriter

== See also ==
- List of areas in Kingston upon Hull
