= British Rail Class 124 =

Class of 8 six-car diesel multiple units built by Swindon Works

British Rail Class 124 Trans-Pennine
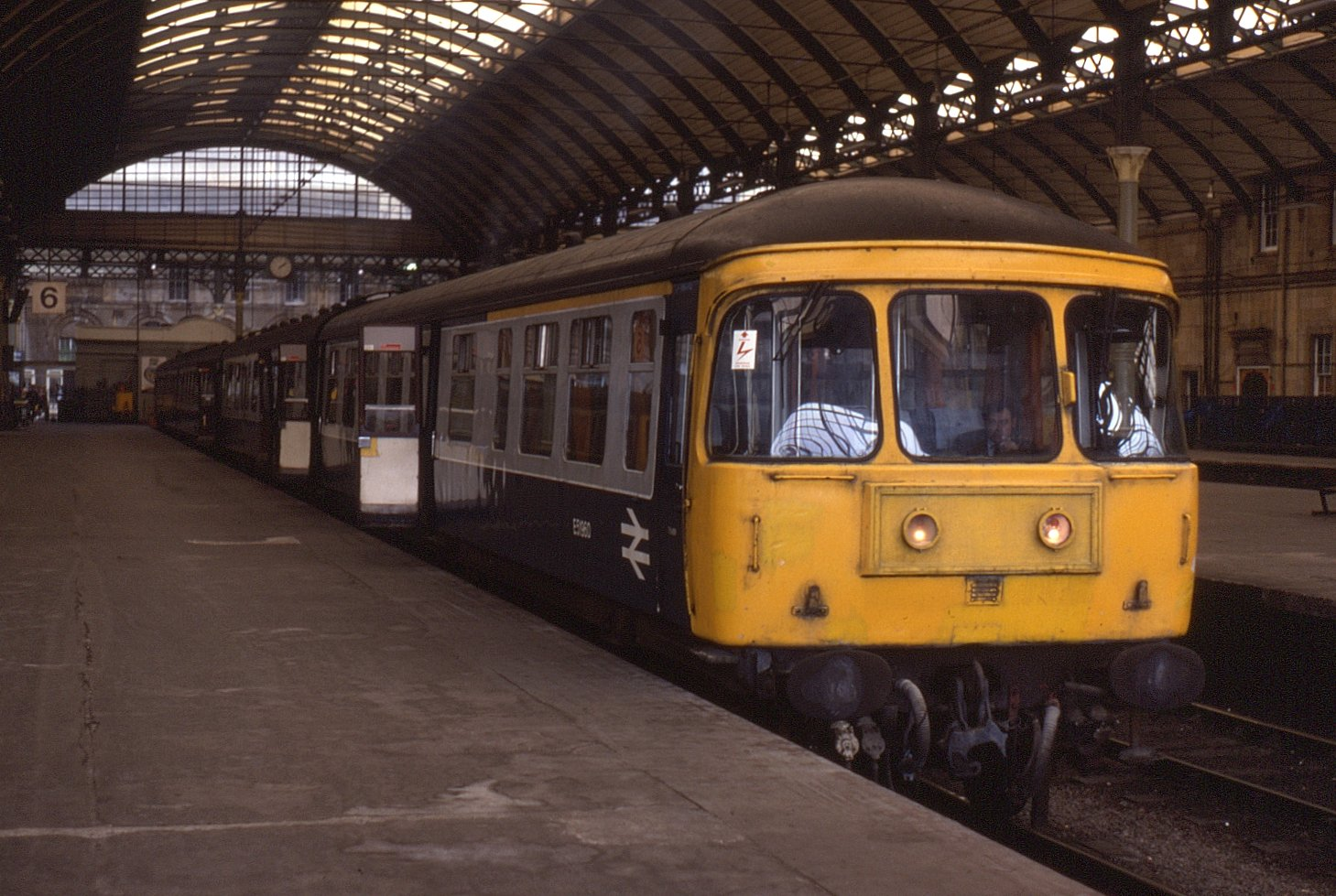
- A British Rail Class 124 at Hull Paragon station in 1983
- In service: 1960–1984
- Manufacturer: British Rail
- Order nos.: 30603 (DMC); 30604 (MBSK); 30605 (TSL); 30606 (TFLRB)
- Built at: Swindon Works
- Family name: First generation Trans-Pennine
- Replaced: Steam locomotives and carriages
- Constructed: 1960
- Entered service: 1960–61
- Scrapped: 1984
- Number built: Eight 6-car sets, plus 3 spare cars
- Number scrapped: All
- Formation: DMC+MBSL+TSL+TFLRB+MBSL+DMC
- Diagram: BR562 (TFB); DP316 or BR577 (DMC); DR201 or BR579 (MBS); DT212 or BR573 (TS); DU205 (TBS, converted from MBS)
- Fleet numbers: 51951-51967 (DMC); 51968-51984 (MBSK/TBS); 59765-59773 (TSL); 59774-59781 (TFLRB)
- Operator: British Rail
- Depots: Hull Botanic Gardens; Leeds Neville Hill
- Line served: Trans-Pennine

Specifications
- Car body construction: Steel
- Car length: 64 ft 9 in (19.74 m) (DMC, over body); 64 ft 6 1/8 in (19.663 m) (over body, others)
- Width: 9 ft 3 in (2.82 m) (over handles)
- Height: 12 ft 9 1/2 in (3.899 m) (overall)
- Doors: Slam
- Wheelbase: 46 ft 6 in (14.17 m) (bogie centres); 8 ft 6 in (2.59 m) (bogies)
- Maximum speed: 70 mph (113 km/h)
- Weight: 228 long tons (232 t; 255 short tons)
- Prime mover: 2 × 230-horsepower (170 kW) Leyland Albion per power car
- Engine type: Diesel
- Transmission: Mechanical
- HVAC: Oil burning air heater
- Bogies: DT4 mk1 and mk2 (one of each, TSL); DD3 (others)
- Braking system: Vacuum
- Safety system: AWS
- Coupling system: Buckeye; Screw
- Multiple working: ■ Blue Square
- Track gauge: 1,435 mm (4 ft 8 1/2 in) standard gauge

The British Rail Class 124 diesel multiple units were built by BR Swindon Works in 1960.

== History ==
The type were built at British Railways Swindon Works and were introduced in 1960, and were regularly used on the Liverpool to Hull Trans Pennine route. The appearance of the units was the result of the industrial designer E.G. Wilkes.

In 1977 the type was integrated with the Class 123, and were found on various workings in Northern England.

All were withdrawn in 1984, none survived into preservation.
