= British Rail Class 170 =

British diesel multiple-unit train by Bombardier

British Rail Class 170 Turbostar
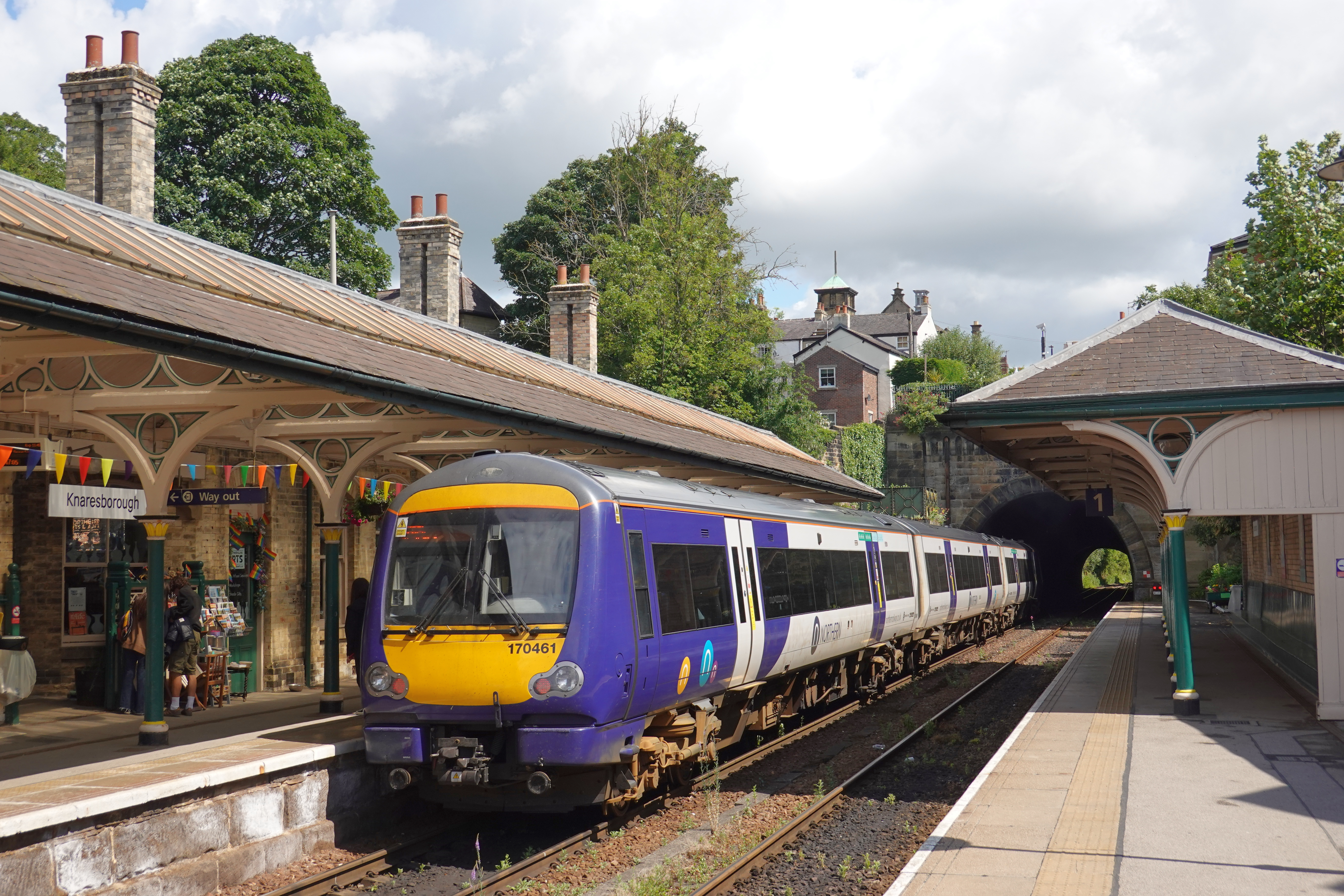
- A Northern Trains Class 170/4 at Knaresborough

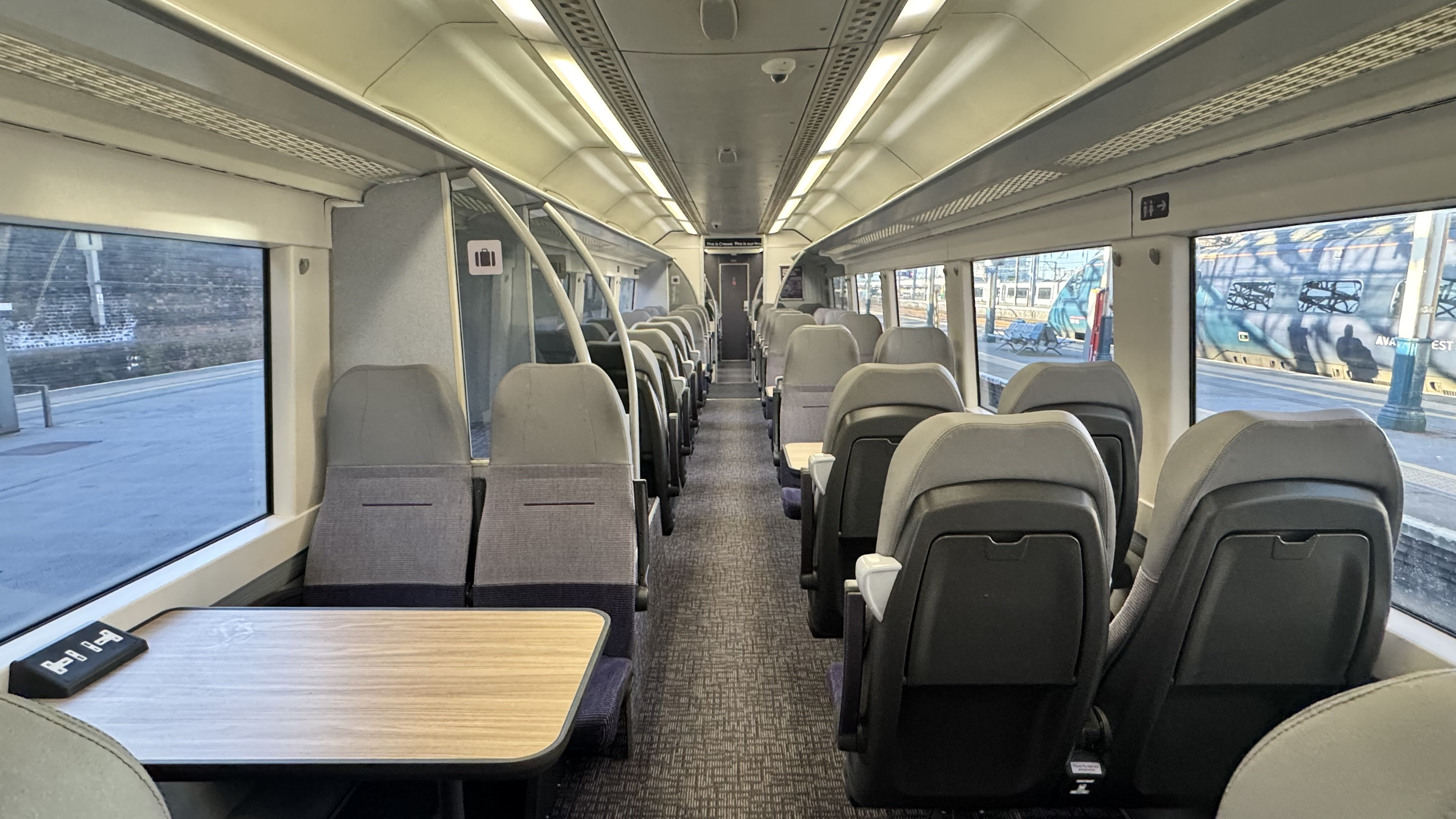
- The interior of a refurbished East Midlands Railway Class 170
- In service: 30 May 1999 – present
- Manufacturers: Adtranz; Bombardier Transportation
- Built at: Derby Litchurch Lane Works
- Family name: Turbostar
- Replaced: Class 142; Class 143; Class 144; Class 150; Class 153; Class 156; Class 158; Class 205; Class 207; Class 310
- Constructed: 1998–2005
- Number built: 139
- Number in service: 122; (9 converted to Class 168, 8 converted to Class 171)
- Formation: 2 or 3 cars per unit
- Owners: Eversholt Rail Group; Porterbrook
- Operators: CrossCountry; East Midlands Railway; Northern Trains; ScotRail
- Depots: Tyseley TMD; Derby Etches Park; Nottingham Eastcroft; Botanic Gardens (Kingston upon Hull); Neville Hill (Leeds); Edinburgh Haymarket

Specifications
- Car body construction: Welded aluminium, with steel body ends
- Car length: DM vehs.: 23.62 m (77 ft 6 in); MS vehs.: 23.61 m (77 ft 6 in)
- Width: 2.69 m (8 ft 10 in)
- Height: 3.77 m (12 ft 4 in)
- Doors: Double-leaf sliding plug (2 per side per car)
- Maximum speed: 100 mph (160 km/h)
- Prime mover: 2 or 3 × MTU 6R 183 TD 13H (one per car)
- Engine type: Inline-6 4-stroke turbo-diesel
- Power output: 315 kW (422 hp) per engine
- Transmission: Voith T 211 rzze hydrokinetic (one per vehicle)
- Acceleration: max. 0.5 m/s^{2} (1.6 ft/s^{2})
- Bogies: Adtranz/Bombardier; Powered: P3-23; Unpowered: T3-23
- Braking system: Electro-pneumatic (disc)
- Safety systems: AWS; TPWS
- Coupling system: BSI
- Multiple working: Within class, plus Classes 14x ,15x and 172
- Track gauge: 1,435 mm (4 ft 8 1/2 in) standard gauge

The British Rail Class 170 Turbostar is a British diesel-hydraulic multiple unit passenger train designed and built by Adtranz, and later by Bombardier Transportation, at Derby Litchurch Lane Works.

The Class 170 was derived from the British Rail Class 165 and 166 DMUs, known as the Networker Turbos, of the 1990s. The first units were introduced to service in May 1999, shortly after the privatisation of British Rail; they have been commonly used to operate regional as well as long-distance services, and to a lesser extent suburban services. A total of 139 units were built, but some were later converted to Class 168 and Class 171 units. These trains are currently in use with CrossCountry, East Midlands Railway, Northern Trains and ScotRail.

== Design ==
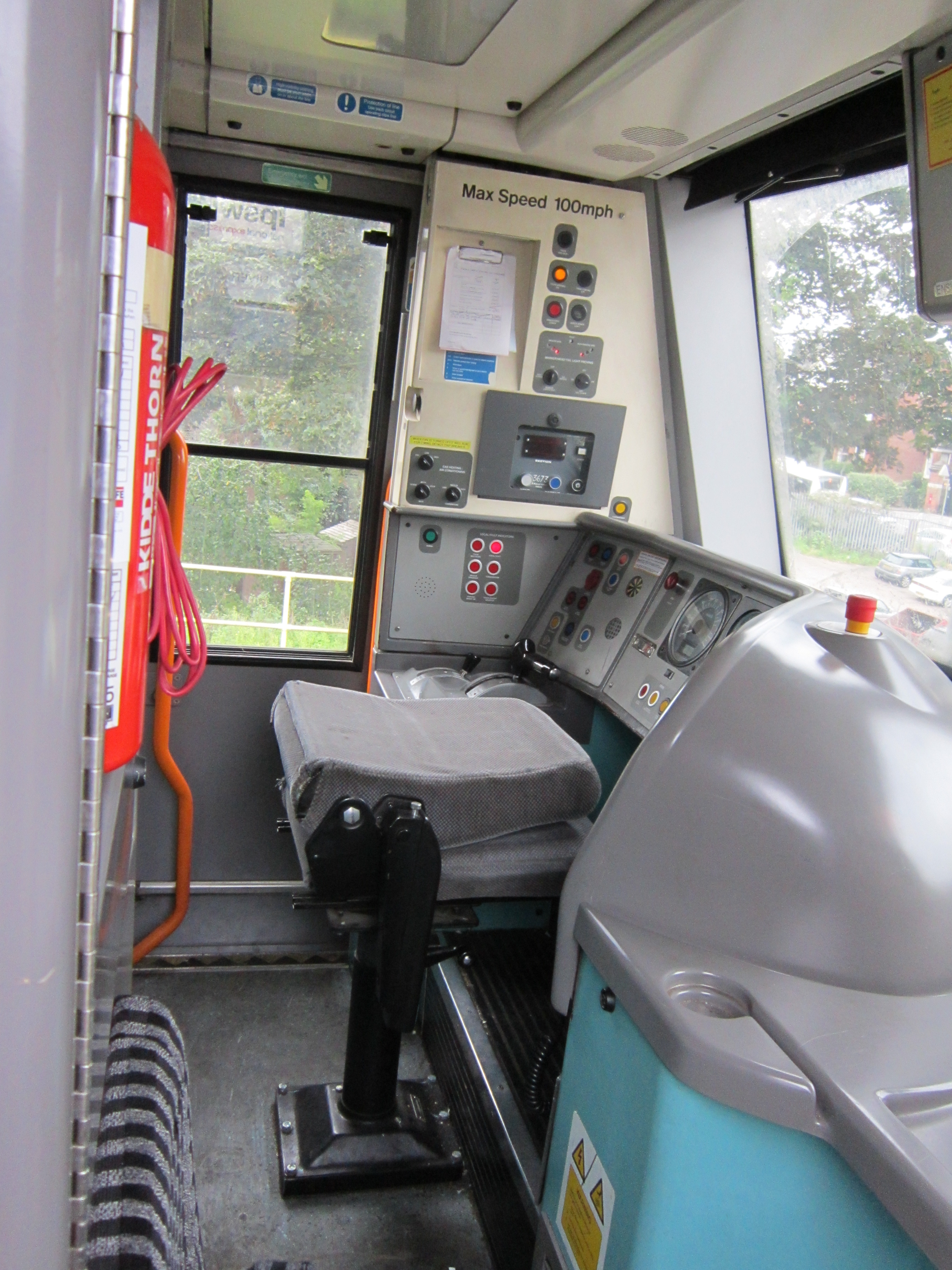
Driving cab of a 170/2

The Class 170 diesel multiple unit (DMU) is a development of the design used in the British Rail Class 165 and 166 DMUs known as the Networker Turbos and built by British Rail Engineering Limited and later ABB Transportation before that company became part of Bombardier.

Notable features shared are the aluminium alloy frame and Voith transmission as well as the general body shape (the cab ends are similar to those of the Class 168, but not Class 165/166), interior design and door fittings. The final drive is sourced from ZF instead of Gmeinder and the diesel-engine supplier is MTU.

The engine and transmission are located under the body. One bogie per coach is powered. All coaches in the set are powered when in use (there are no unpowered trailers). The units can work in multiple with trains in the 15X series, i.e. Sprinters and 14X Pacers (the latter empty only), and with other units of the same class. They are unable to operate in multiple with units in the 16X series due to different wiring arrangements.

Seating arrangements are of both 2+1 (first class) and 2+2 (standard class) formation, and give a seated passenger capacity of between ~100 and ~200 per three-car set (depending on the specifications of the operator). Two-car sets are also operated.

=== Subclasses ===
Class 170 units have been categorised into six (originally seven) sub-classes; the basic specifications remain the same (engine, length, transmission, etc.), the differences being the seating arrangements specified by the different operators. Because of the different interior fittings the sub-classes differ in weight from one another by a small amount, up to around 2 tonnes.

All the sub-classes were built at Derby Litchurch Lane Works either under Adtranz or Bombardier Transportation ownership. The change of ownership occurred in 2001, but early Bombardier units (such as the 2002 two-car 170/2 Phase 2 units) still display ADtranz branding, such as on the window glazing, due to use of backstocked parts.

== Current operations ==
Most units are owned by Porterbrook, although units 170416–424 are owned by Eversholt Rail Group. They are leased to the train operating companies.

=== ScotRail ===
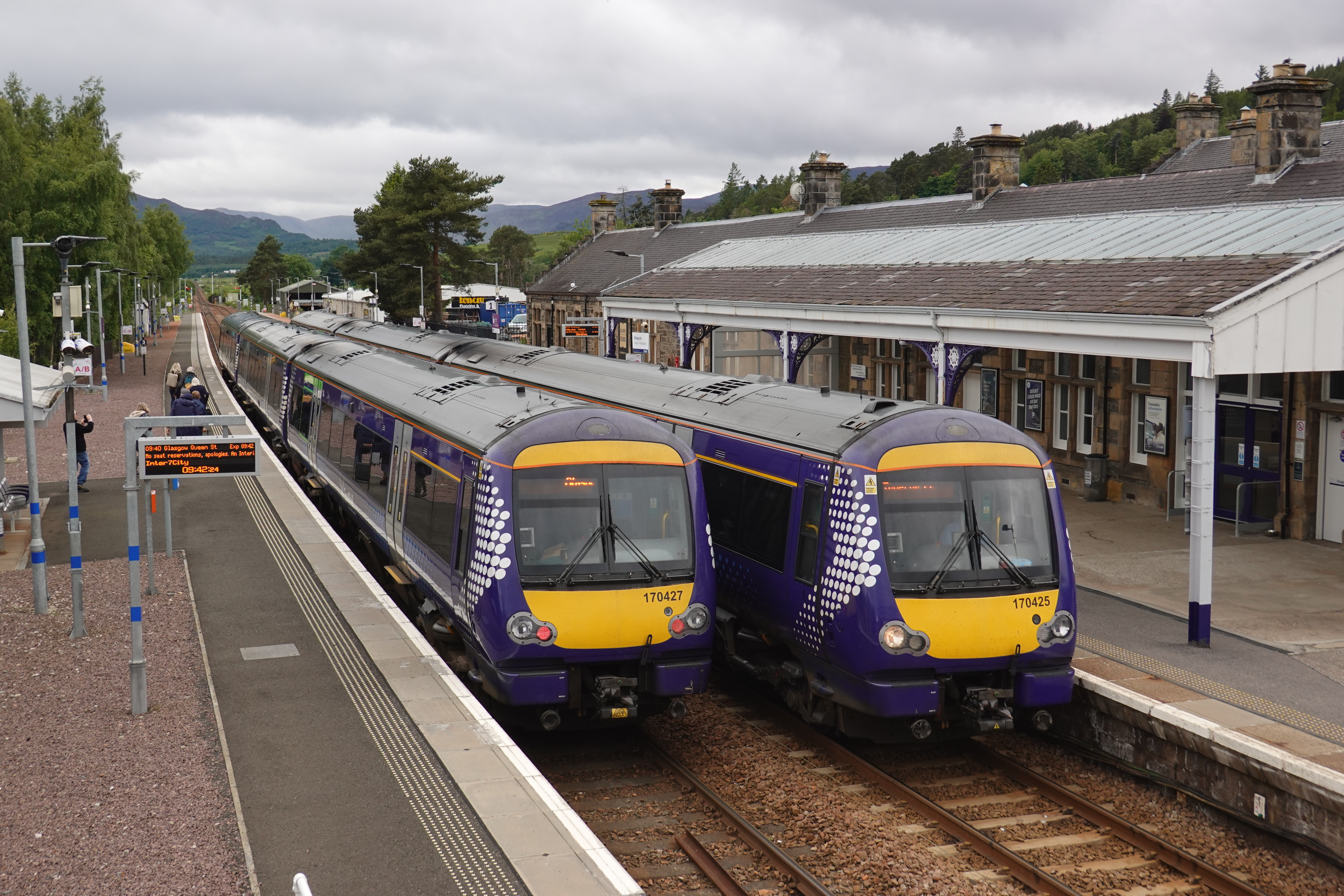
Two ScotRail Class 170/4s at Kingussie in 2024

ScotRail was at one point the largest operator of the Class 170, with a fleet that formerly comprised 59 three-car sets but has since been reduced to 34 sets. All units are allocated to Edinburgh Haymarket depot.

The first Class 170s in Scotland were 24 units built for ScotRail (National Express) between 1999 and 2001 (170401–170424), which had first-class accommodation for use on ScotRail Express services (i.e. the Edinburgh–Glasgow Queen Street shuttle) and Aberdeen/Inverness–Glasgow/Edinburgh services. A further ten similar units (170425–170434) were built in 2003–2004 to complete the conversion of ScotRail Express services from Class 158 to Class 170 operation. By the time the second batch entered service the franchise had passed to First ScotRail.

Two standard-class only units were provided for Strathclyde Partnership for Transport (SPT) services from Glasgow Queen Street in 2001 (170470–170471), followed in 2004–2005 by seven more units for SPT (170472–170478) and 12 similar units for Edinburgh commuter services (170450–170461). In December 2008, six of the standard-class-only units (170450–170455) were fitted with first-class sections, and two more (170456 and 170457) were fitted with first class in December 2011.

A further four three-car sets (170393–170396) with first class accommodation and 'mini-buffets', were obtained from Hull Trains in 2005, bringing the First ScotRail Class 170 fleet up to a peak of 59 three-car sets. The former Hull Trains units were initially used on ScotRail Express services to Inverness, but by 2012 the buffets were out of use and all four units were converted to standard class only.

The nine units built for SPT services were delivered in SPT livery, whereas the rest of the fleet carried First ScotRail livery (170401–170424 having originally worn the National Express ScotRail 'swoosh' livery). In September 2008, the Scottish Government's agency Transport Scotland announced that all ScotRail trains (including from the Strathclyde Partnership for Transport) would eventually be repainted in a new blue livery with white Saltire markings on the carriage ends.

In April 2015, the ScotRail franchise passed from First ScotRail to Abellio ScotRail, and nine units owned by Eversholt went off-lease. Five (170416–170420) remained in Scotland on short-term lease to Abellio ScotRail (albeit with ScotRail branding removed) until their transfer to East Midlands Railway in 2020, whilst the other four units (170421–170424) were converted into Class 171s for their new operator Southern.

As a result of the electrification of the Edinburgh to Glasgow Queen Street line in 2018 and the conversion of ScotRail Express services to Aberdeen and Inverness to HSTs in 2018–2019, the Class 170s are being displaced from ScotRail Express routes. Additionally, electrification of most of the Glasgow Queen Street (High Level) commuter lines and of the Edinburgh to Dunblane route will see Class 170s displaced from these services once the Class 385 EMU fleet is fully operational. Some of the surplus Class 170s will be cascaded to other ScotRail services replacing older Class 156 and 158 units, but 16 units were transferred to Arriva Rail North (170453–170461 and 170472–170478). The first four of these units moved to Northern in March 2018, followed by a further four in August 2018.

=== CrossCountry ===
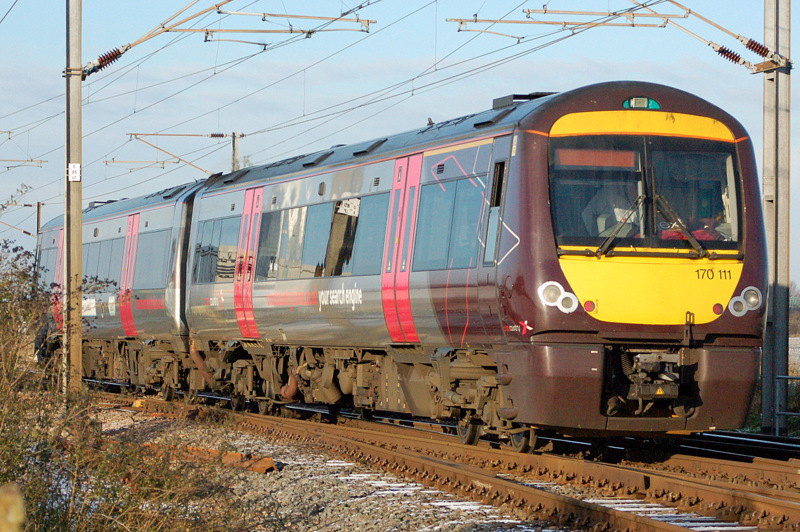
CrossCountry Class 170/1 (first livery and refurbishment) at Great Shelford in 2010

CrossCountry currently operates 29 Class 170 Turbostars (seven two-car and 22 three-car) on services between Cardiff Central and Nottingham, and between Birmingham, Leicester, and Stansted Airport. After having been acquired from Central Trains in 2007 (as 13 two-car and 16 three-car units, but since reconfigured - see below), these units were refurbished in 2008, with the then-three-car units repainted at Marcroft Engineering, Stoke-on-Trent, the then-two-car units at EWS' Toton depot and the interiors done by Transys Projects, Clacton-on-Sea including the fitting of first-class seating to the Class 170/5s and 170/6s.

In 2021, the centre cars from the six formerly three-car ex West Midlands Trains (WMT) 170s were transferred to CrossCountry and inserted into six of its formerly two-car units, turning them into three-car units while retaining the CrossCountry driving vehicles' first class, due to the ex-WTR driving vehicles being standard class-only (East Midlands Railway had leased the aforementioned ex-WMT units, but only required two-car units from that batch, therefore CrossCountry was able to utilise the surplus centre cars). This resulted in a reconfiguration of CrossCountry's 29 170s from their previous 13 two-car and 16 three-car units, to their current seven two-car and 22 three-car units. The extra centre cars were re-liveried and internally refurbished to match the units they were inserted into.

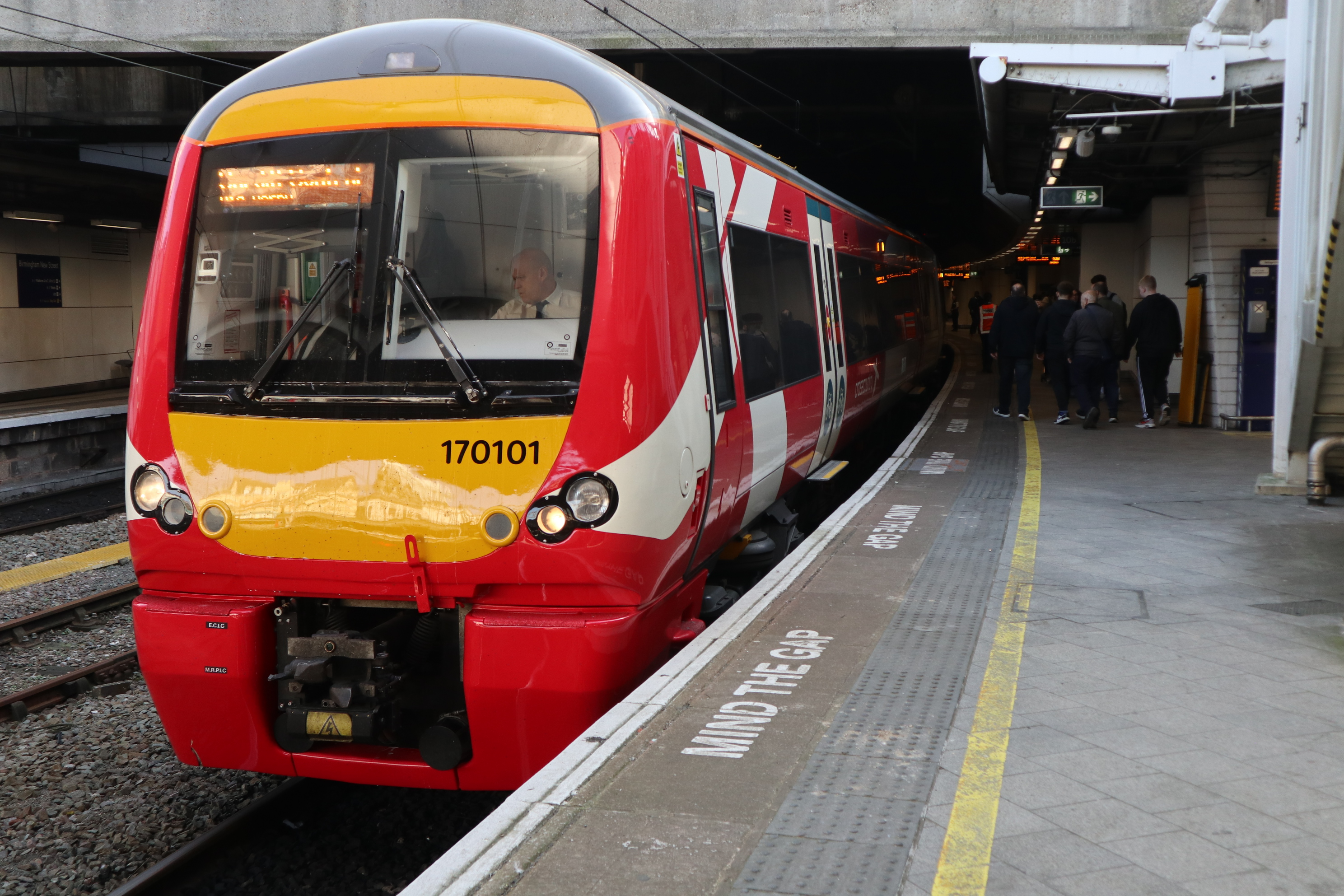
CrossCountry Class 170/1 (newest livery and mid-life refurbishment) at Birmingham New Street in 2025

In February 2025, 170101, the first CrossCountry 170 to receive the operator's second, mid-life refurbishment, re-entered service. This refurbishment includes an exterior repaint in a new livery, an interior repaint and new seats (including the replacement of the former first class 2+1 seating - declassified since late 2024 - with 2+2 seating, which also makes up for the wheelchair and bicycle spaces now being separate rather than shared). It also includes new tables and carpets, full-length installation of 3-pin AC power sockets and USB DC power sockets of types A and C, new interior passenger information screens and new CCTV and passenger counting, as well as 'refreshed' toilets.

=== Northern Trains ===
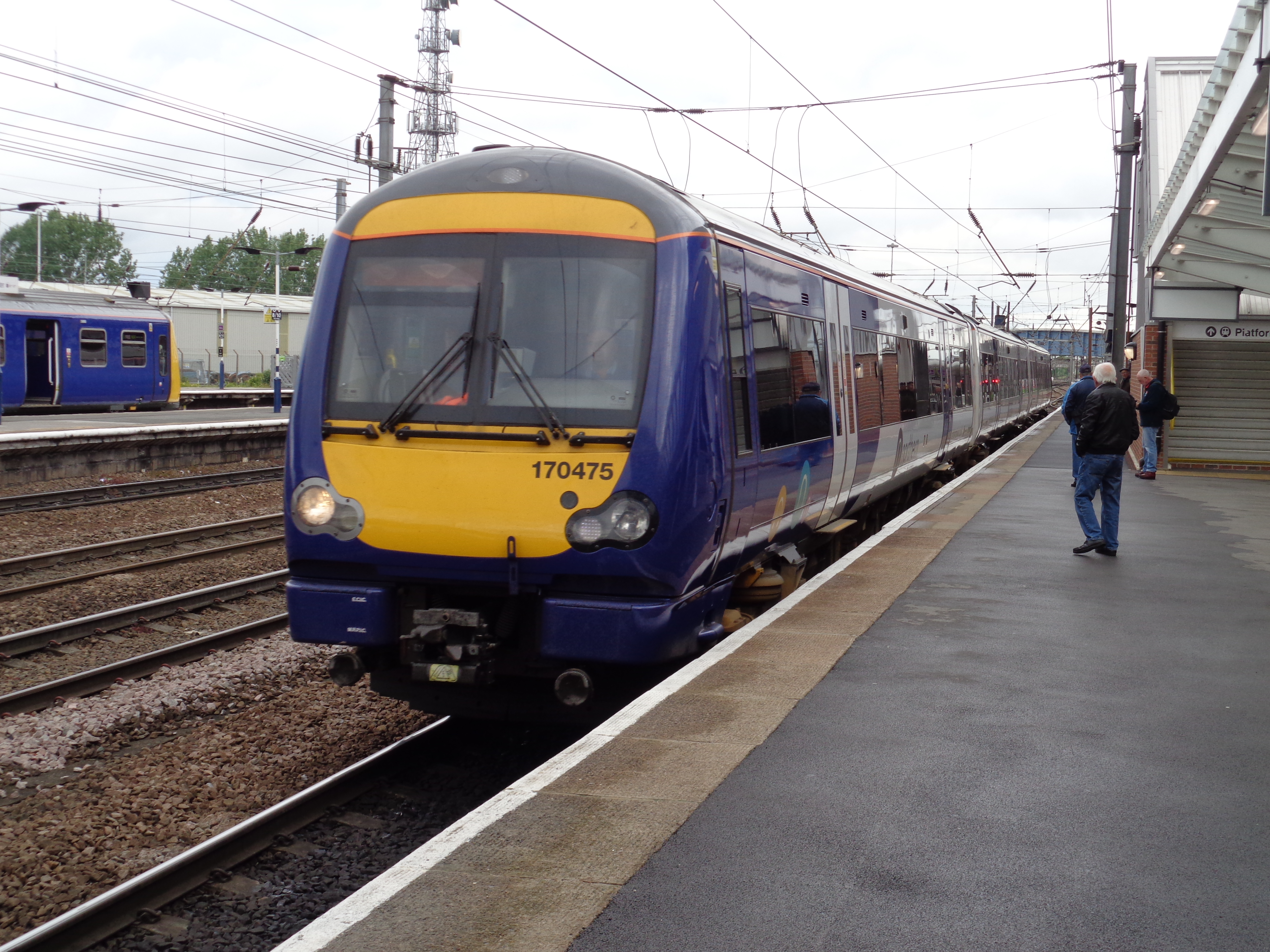
Arriva Rail North Class 170/4 at Doncaster in 2019

Arriva Rail North began operating the Class 170 in 2018, with a total of 16 three-car units (170453-170461 and 170472-170478) received from Abellio ScotRail by January 2019. These can now be seen operating services between Sheffield and Scarborough via Hull and have diagrams around the Harrogate Loop, on which they share duties with Class 158 DMUs. The units are maintained at Neville Hill TMD and Botanic Gardens TMD, and receive light maintenance at Sheffield.

On 1 March 2020, these units transferred to new operator Northern Trains.

=== East Midlands Railway ===
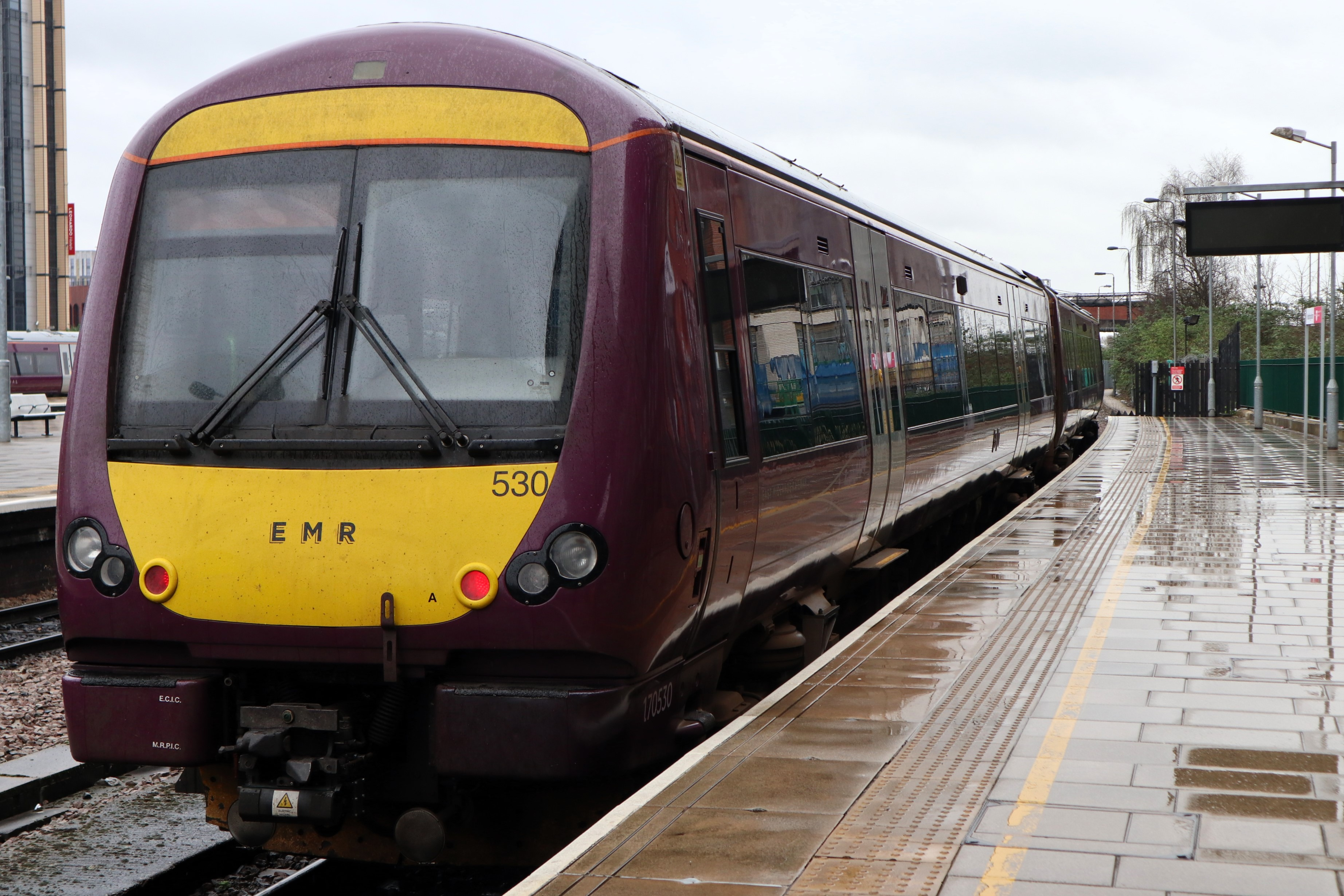
EMR Class 170/5 at Nottingham in 2024

East Midlands Railway currently operates the largest fleet of 170s, which consists of 43 total two-car and three-car sets, even though it has only been a 170 operator since 2020.

From 23 March 2020, East Midlands Railway received its first two Class 170 units in the form of three-car 170416 and 170417, when they moved from Abellio ScotRail. The former was seen in EMR livery on 30 April 2020.

Unit 170417, named The Key Worker, was the first unit to enter service, doing so on 2 November 2020 on the Robin Hood line, as part of EMR's soft launch of the class.

Alongside units 170418–170420 (also from ScotRail), as EMR had planned to become the largest operator of the Class 170, a further 23 units arrived from West Midlands Trains as well as 12 from Transport for Wales Rail. The 170s have replaced units of classes 153 and 156.

In September 2022, three Class 171s, having been reformed to three-car formations and renumbered to 170422–170424, transferred from Southern to East Midlands Railway. They were then renumbered with 1709xx unit numbers before entering service, in order to emphasise the difference between them and the rest of the fleet, as they had Dellner couplers rather than BSI couplers, so they were not compatible with the rest of the fleet. They regained their identities as 170/4s when BSI couplers were fitted in May 2023 and they can now work with the rest of the fleet instead of being on self contained diagrams.

A refurbishment program for the East Midlands units are ongoing, with the first unit completed its refurbishment and re-entered service.

== Former operations ==
=== Midland Mainline ===
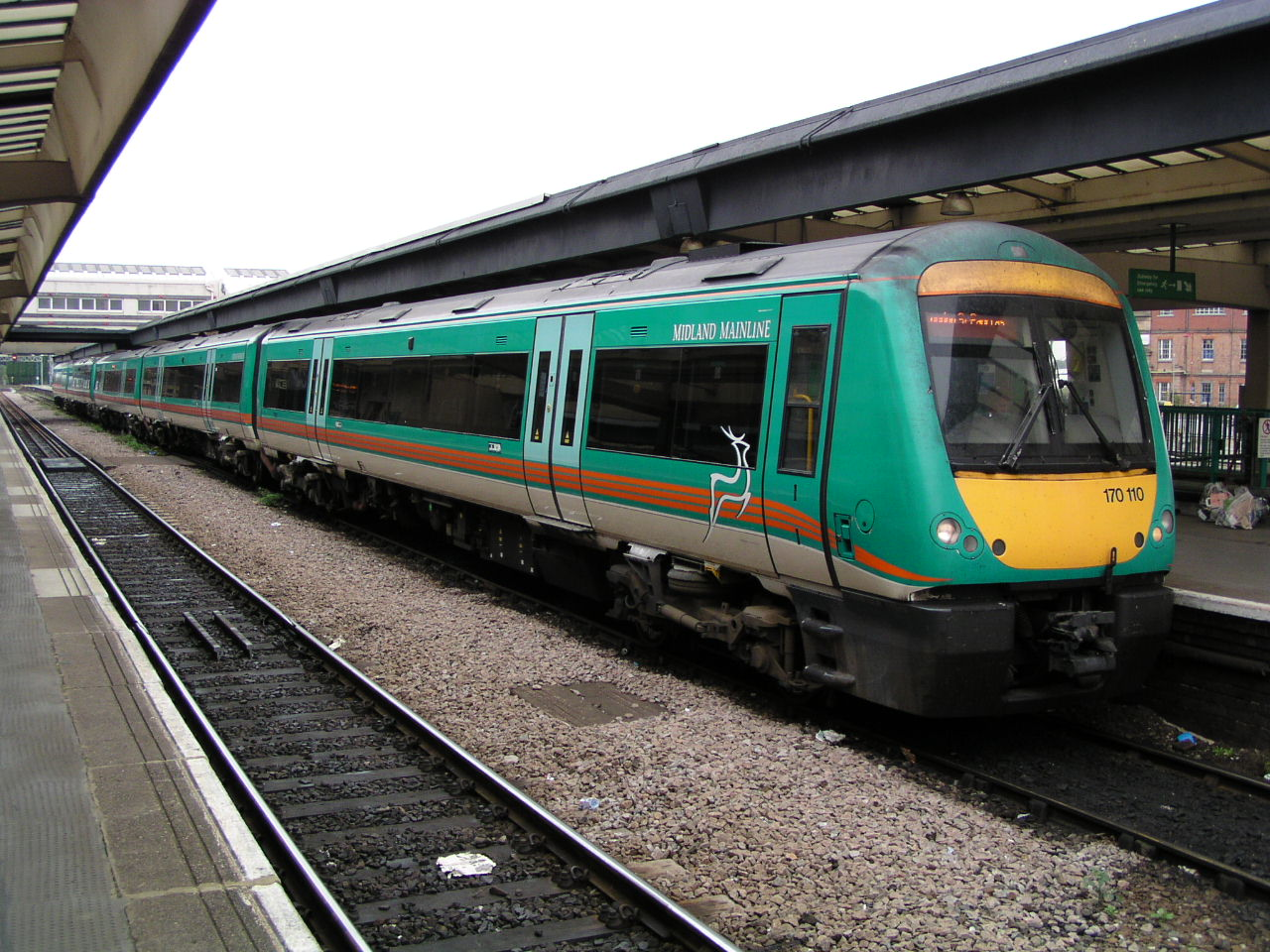
A pair of Midland Mainline Class 170/1s at Derby in 2003

Midland Mainline (MML) was the first operator to order Turbostars, the first being delivered in November 1998 and entering service in May 1999. The Class 170/1 units were built immediately after the Class 168/0 units were built for Chiltern Railways. MML ordered a fleet of 17 two-car Class 170 units, although the first ten were subsequently made up of three cars each instead. These were numbered 170101–117. The units were introduced on stopping services from London St Pancras to Leicester, Derby and Nottingham. They were also used on summer Saturday services from London to York, which later became a year-round service with summer extension to Scarborough. Class 170s were also used on direct services between London St Pancras and Matlock, these services ended upon the replacement of the Class 170s with new Class 222 Meridian units due to weight restrictions on the Derwent Valley line to Matlock.

In 2004, Midland Mainline introduced new Class 222 Meridian units, which started to replace the Turbostars. As a result, the fleet was transferred to sister company Central Trains. Ten units (170101–170110) are three-car units, and the remaining seven units (170111–170117) are two-car units. As with the three spot-hire units from Porterbrook, these 17 units had first-class accommodation, which was declassified.

=== Govia Thameslink Railway ===
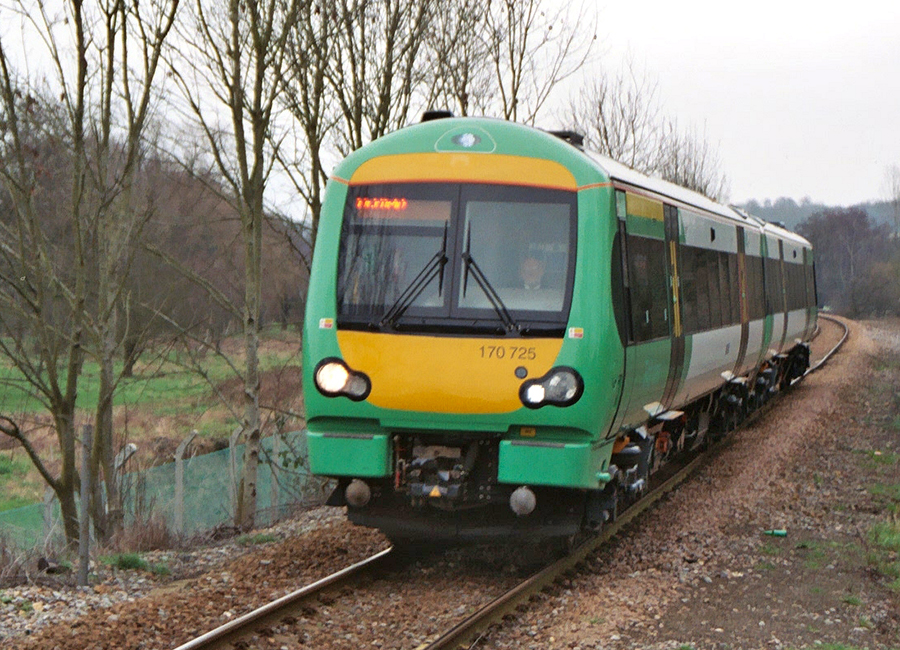
Southern Class 170/7 no. 170725 arriving in Uckfield in 2004

Southern obtained six two-car Class 170/7 units, along with six four-car Class 171/8 units, in 2003 to replace its slam-door Class 205 and Class 207 units on services on the Marshlink Line and Oxted Line to Uckfield.

Southern later fitted these units with the Dellner type coupler used on its Class 171s, reclassifying its two-car units as Class 171/7, replacing the standard BSI coupler fitted to Class 170s. This was done to allow them to couple to Class 377s in an emergency.

Southern later acquired 170392 from South West Trains, which became its tenth four-car, 171730. This unit had already carried Southern livery, being ordered as an add-on to a Southern order to save costs, and was delivered accordingly in Southern livery as 170727. It was renumbered and reliveried at Ashford Chart Leacon Works before entering traffic.

At the end of the First ScotRail franchise in March 2015, 170416 to 170424 were returned to Eversholt Rail Group. The first five units then remained on hire to Abellio ScotRail via a sublease arrangement until March 2020, while 170421 to 170424 moved to Wolverton Works in April 2015. They were overhauled and converted to Class 171s intended for Southern. Following issues with the conversion and reliability issues, the remaining units were then handed back to Eversholt Rail Group where they were then re-leased to East Midlands Railway. Two became two-car 171/2s and two four-car Class 171/4s. All four were returned to Eversholt in 2022 and leased to East Midlands Railway. Having been reformed back into their original three-carriage formations, the first three were transferred in September 2022. They will be converted back to Class 170s and resume their original identities, while the fourth will remain on sublease to Govia Thameslink Railway.

=== Hull Trains ===
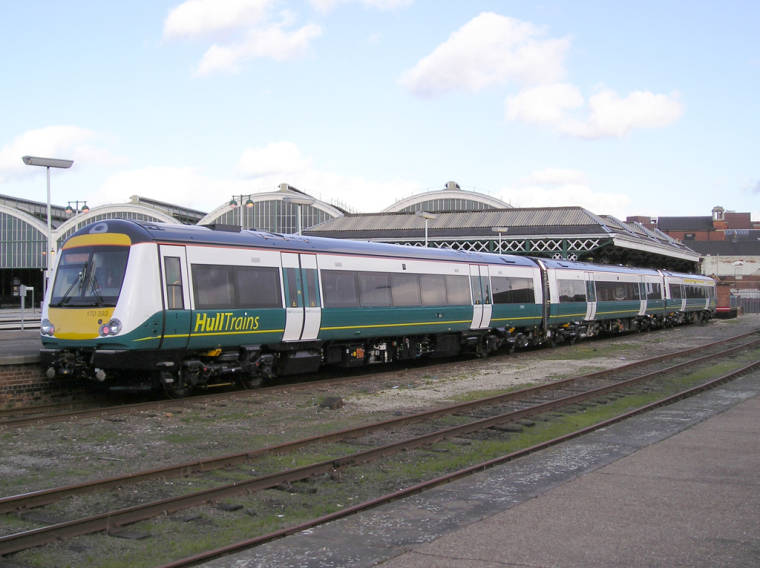
A Class 170/3 operated by Hull Trains

Hull Trains began its London King's Cross to Hull services in September 2000 using Turbostars, initially with four sets on short-term lease from Anglia Railways. In 2004, it received four of its own three-car Class 170/3 units, and returned the original units to Anglia.

In 2005, following its acquisition by FirstGroup, Hull Trains received four new Class 222/1 Pioneer units and transferred the Turbostars to its sister company First ScotRail.

=== South West Trains ===
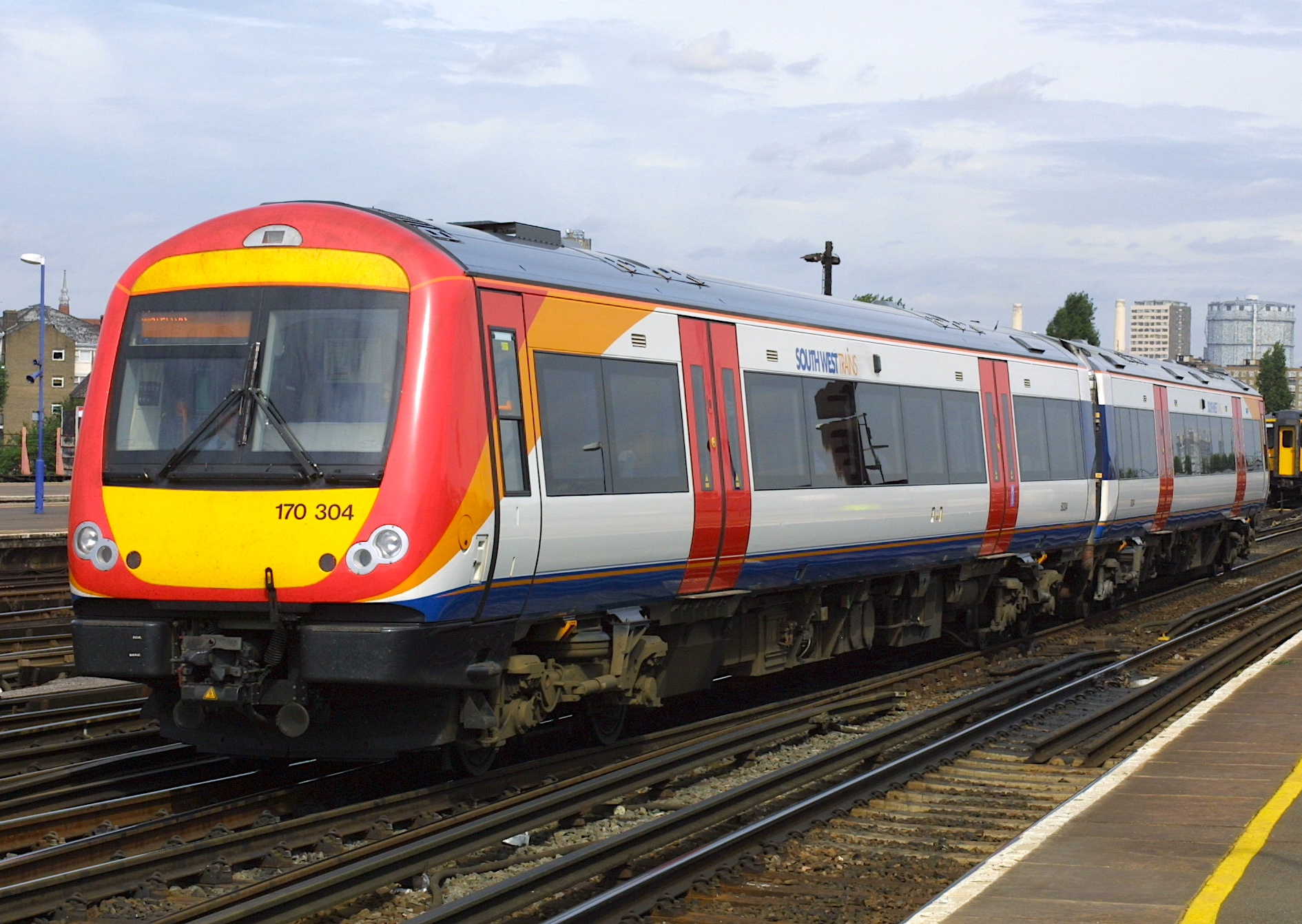
South West Trains Class 170/3 at Clapham Junction in 2001

South West Trains (SWT) acquired a fleet of eight two-car Class 170/3 units in 2000 (later to nine units supplemented by ex-Southern 170392), to supplement its existing Class 159 fleet. Units operated on London Waterloo to Salisbury, Reading to Brighton, Southampton local services, and occasionally on services to Exeter St Davids, though this was not a regular route for these units, as they do not feature end gangways, making it difficult to provide trolley services, and they lacked selective door opening for the short platforms at stations on the route west of Salisbury. All but one of these units were transferred to First TransPennine Express at the end of 2006, in exchange for some Class 158 Express Sprinters. Unit 170392 was transferred back to its original intended operator Southern and has since been reclassified and renumbered from 170392 to 171730.

=== Central Trains ===
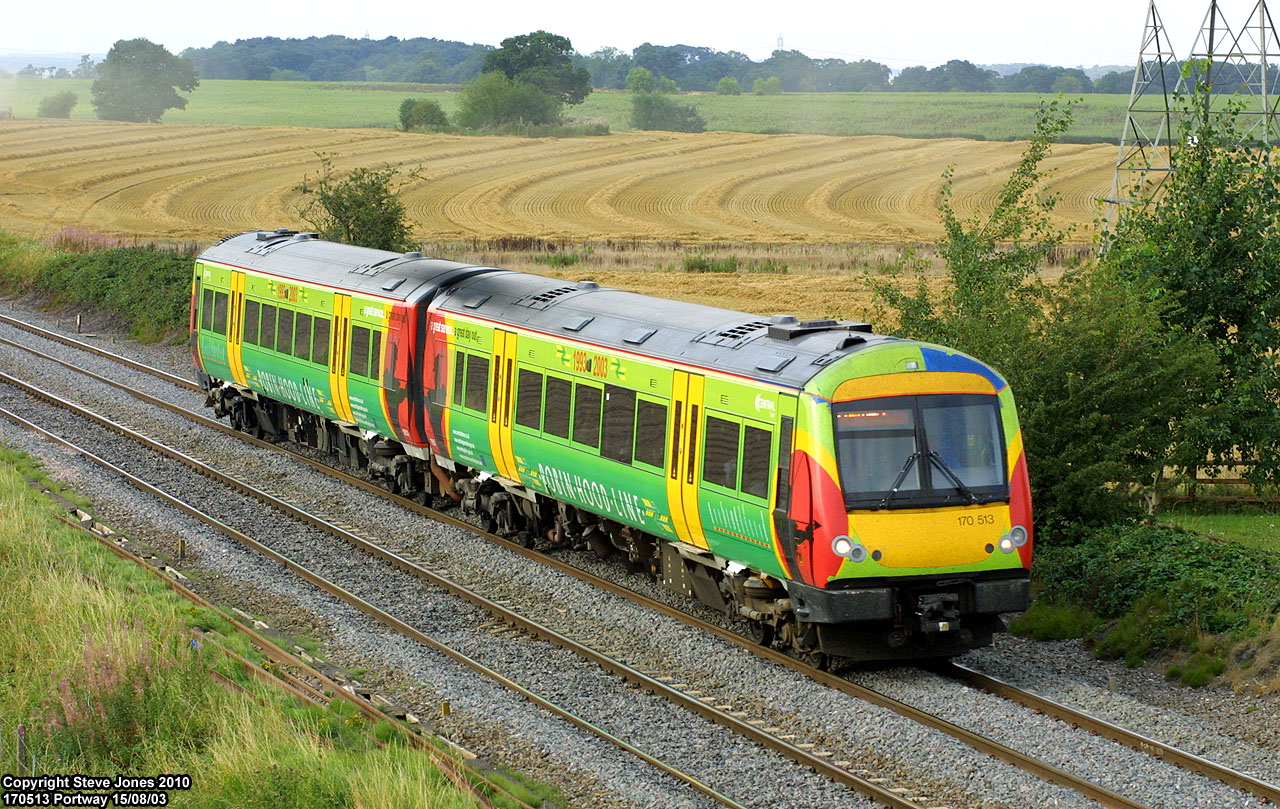
Central Trains Class 170/5 in Robin Hood Line livery in 2003

Central Trains operated a fleet of 53 Class 170 units from various subclasses. In 1999, Central received its first batch of twenty-three two-car Class 170/5 and ten three-car Class 170/6 units. These were used to replace Class 156 units on various longer-distance services.

From late 2004, Central also took three Class 170/3 on lease from Porterbrook. Units 170397–8 are three-car units and 170399 is a two-car unit. All three of these units contained first-class accommodation, which was declassified (allowing standard-class use throughout the train), as first class travel was not provided on Central Trains services. The two three-car units' interiors were of Central Trains style, except the MML-style first class, and the two-car unit had a South West Trains interior. After the Central Trains franchise ended, the two three-car units (170397 and 170398) remained with the new operator, CrossCountry. The one two-car unit was returned to Porterbrook, which subsequently leased it to First TransPennine Express who renumbered the unit to 170309.

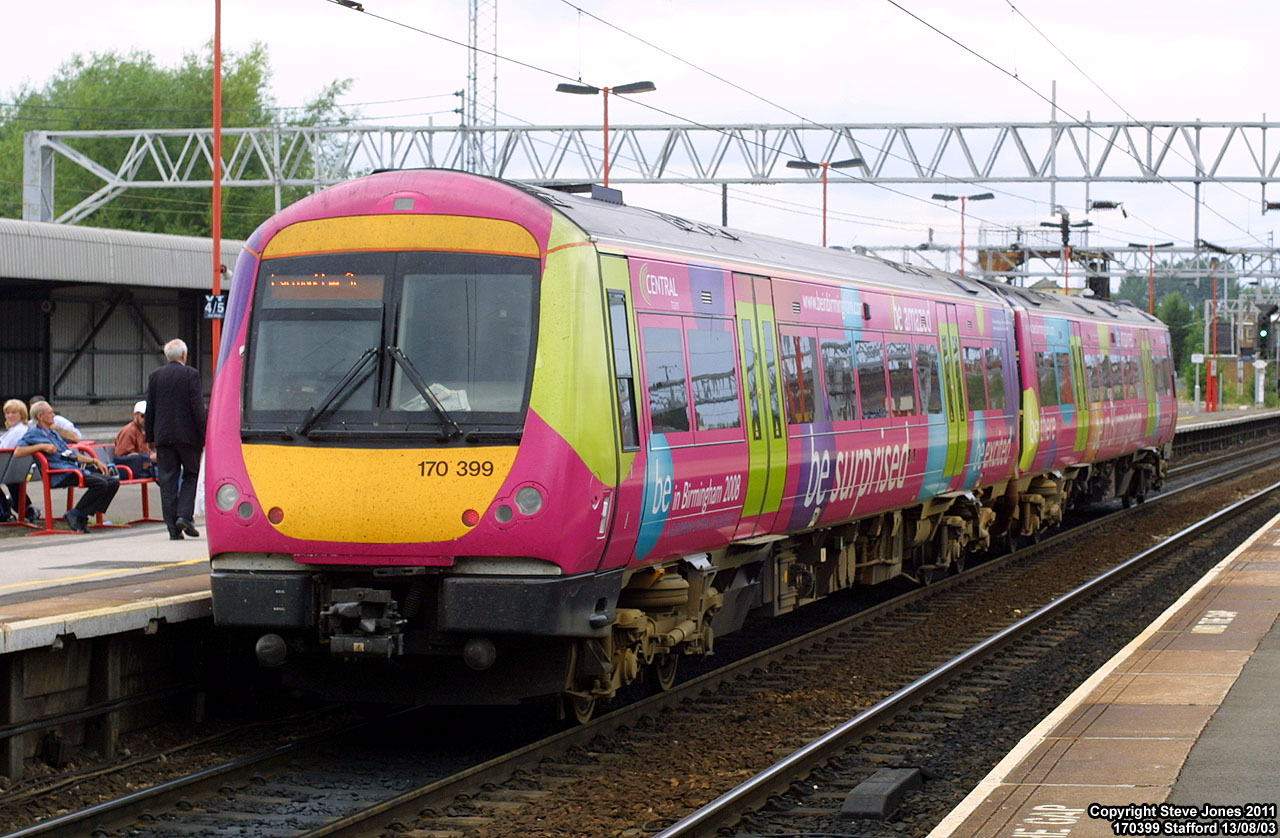
Central Trains Class 170/3 at Stafford in 2003

All Class 170 units in service with Central were used on a variety of services (mostly long-distance) including Birmingham–Stansted Airport, Nottingham–Cardiff and Birmingham–Leicester. Class 170 units were replaced by Class 350 Desiro units on Birmingham New Street to Liverpool Lime Street services.

When Central Trains lost its franchise in 2007, 23 of Central Trains' units (17 two-car and six three-car) were transferred to London Midland, which took over the West Midlands franchise and continued to use Class 170s for services on the Chase Line, Birmingham to Hereford via Bromsgrove Line and Shrewsbury services. 29 out of the remaining 30 units (including the ex-Midland Mainline units and two out of the three spot hire units) were transferred to CrossCountry, which took over the Cardiff-Birmingham-Nottingham and Birmingham-Leicester-Stansted Airport services.

One of Central Trains' 170s (170399) went to First TransPennine Express and was subsequently renumbered 170309; East Midlands Trains did not receive any, despite taking over the previously Class-170-operated Liverpool-to-Norwich route. This route is now operated by refurbished Class 158 units.

=== First TransPennine Express ===
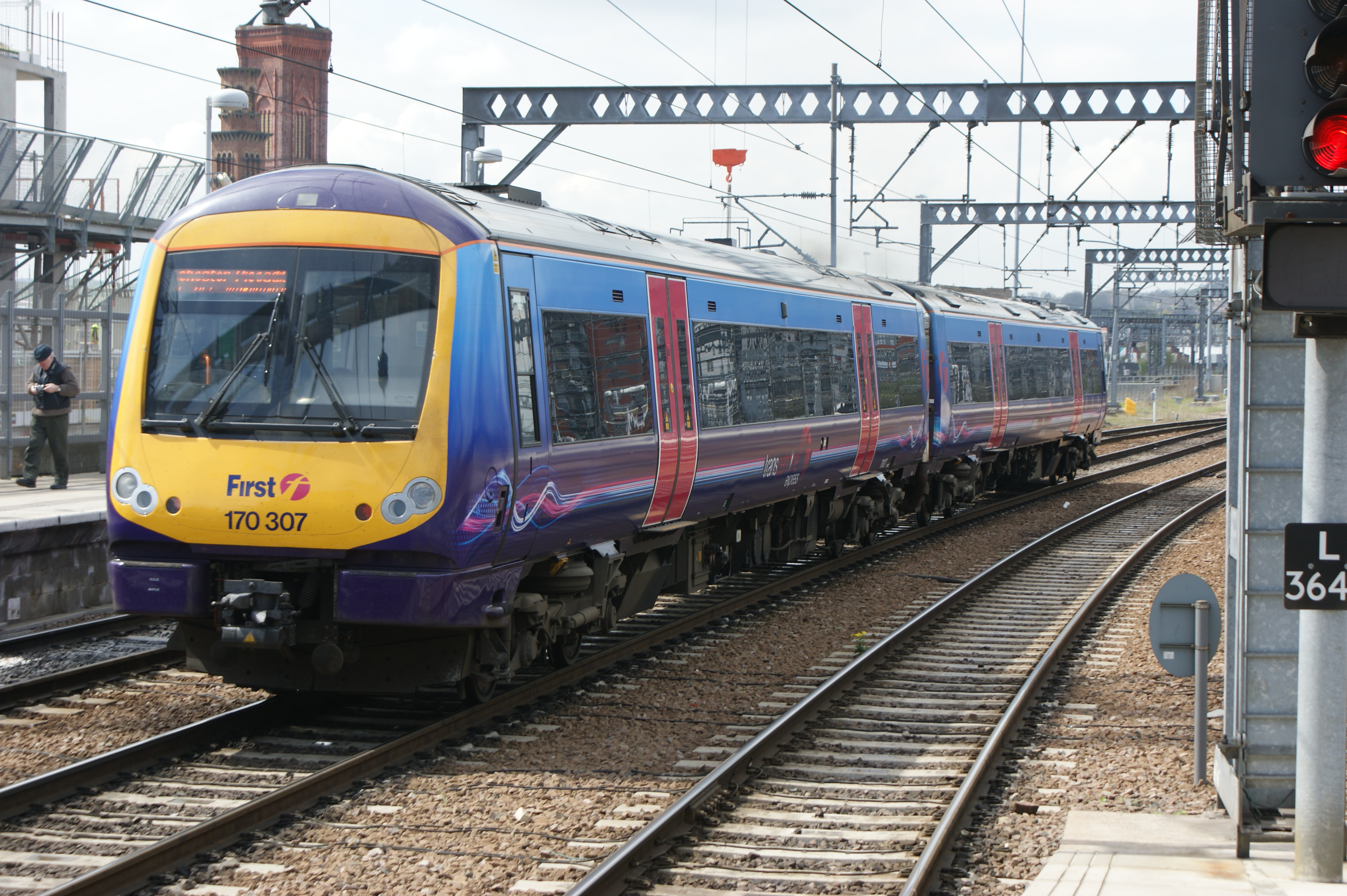
First TransPennine Express Class 170/3 at Leeds in 2008

From late 2006 to 2016, First TransPennine Express operated nine Class 170s, used on the Manchester Piccadilly to Hull route. Originally, Class 185s were set to operate the route, but a combination of weight-restriction problems on the Selby to Hull Line, chronic overcrowding on several of the company's services and the government reducing the amount of money available to First TransPennine Express for new trains resulted in Class 170s coming into service.

First TransPennine Express received eight Turbostars from South West Trains, 170301–308 at the end of 2006 and the start of 2007, as well as 170399 from Central Trains in November 2007, which was renumbered 170309.

From September 2009, two Class 170s were used Sundays to Thursdays on the Cleethorpes–Manchester Airport service.

The units were maintained by Bombardier Crofton. The 170s were later fully refurbished to include CCTV, power sockets throughout, replacement carpets and seat covers and the removal / declassification of one of the two first-class sections, providing more seats. The work was carried out by Transys at Clacton-on-Sea.

However, in March 2014 it was revealed that the nine Turbostars would move to Chiltern Railways. MP Stephen Hammond revealed on 12 March 2014 that all the Class 170/3s would remain with First TransPennine Express until the May 2015 timetable change, when Chiltern would take five of the 170s with the remaining four remaining with First TransPennine Express until the end of the franchise in March 2016 later changed to 8 July 2016. Upon delivery, the Class 170s were modified in Brush Traction to allow them to be used with Chiltern's existing Class 168 units, and were subsequently reclassified as Class 168/3s. Today, the unit numbers are 168321–168329.

However, it was confirmed in November 2018 that TransPennine Express would be hiring one Class 170 per day from Arriva Rail North to run services on the Manchester/Leeds and Huddersfield local services, to allow more Class 185s to be used on other busier services until the new Nova Fleets arrive in 2019. This arrangement ended in May 2019, when Arriva Rail North's subleased Class 185 units returned to TPE.

=== Greater Anglia and predecessors ===
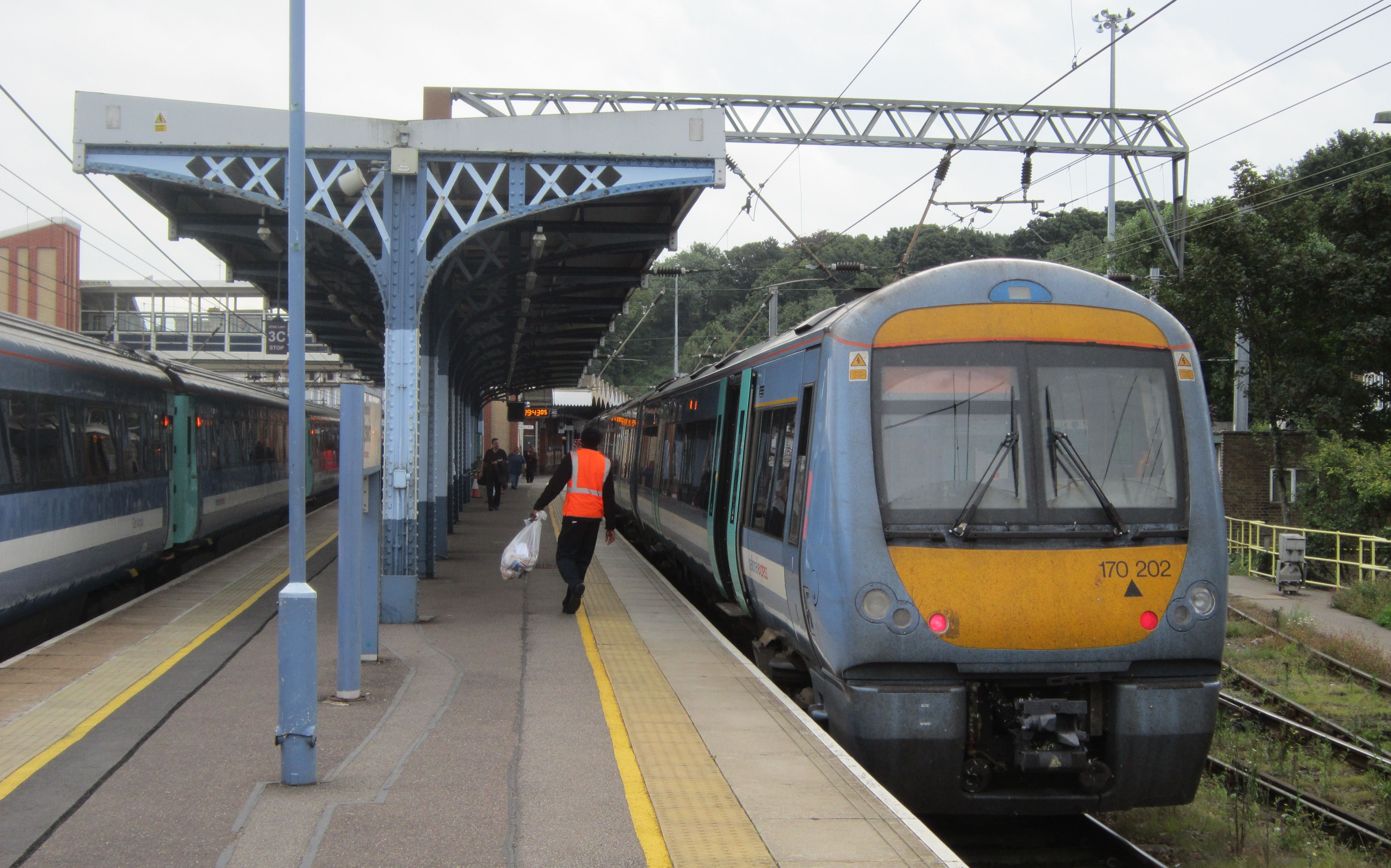
National Express East Anglia Class 170/2 at Ipswich in 2011

Anglia Railways ordered two batches of Turbostars. The first batch of eight three-car Class 170/2 units were built between 1999 and 2000 for London Liverpool Street to Ipswich, Norwich, Lowestoft and Bury St Edmunds services. These supplemented the existing Class 86 locomotive-hauled trains from London to Norwich. Four of these units were later hired to Hull Trains from 2000–2004, before that company acquired its own Turbostars.

Other units, including the spot-hire set 170399, were used on Anglia's short-lived Norwich to Basingstoke 'London Crosslink' service. In 2002, Anglia introduced a new Cambridge to Norwich direct service, and acquired four two-car units dedicated to working these services.

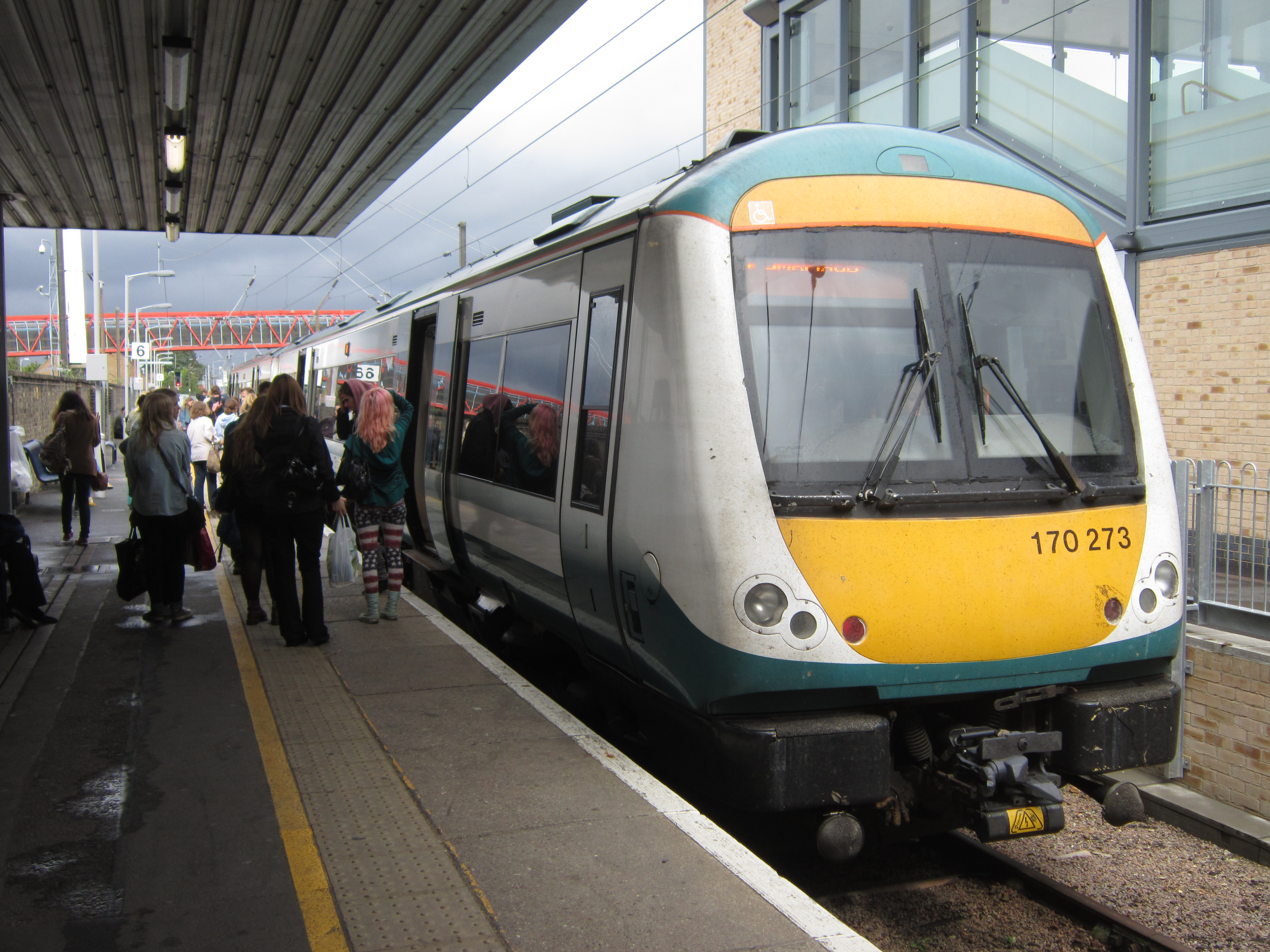
Abellio Greater Anglia Class 170/2 at Cambridge in 2012

In 2004, the Greater Anglia franchise was won by National Express subsidiary One, rebranded as National Express East Anglia in 2008, and passed onto Abellio Greater Anglia in 2012. Since then, two-car Turbostars have been used for the Cambridge to Norwich route, and also on new through services including Cambridge (via Ipswich), Bury St Edmunds (via Ipswich), Peterborough (via Ipswich) and Lowestoft (via Ipswich and East Suffolk Line or Ipswich and Norwich) - London Liverpool Street via Ipswich, although with a new timetable all Class 170 London services ended in December 2010, in favour of connecting branch line trains with GEML expresses.

The three-car trains used to include a buffet and larger first-class area, but because more seating was needed, the buffet area has been removed and the number of first-class seats reduced.

In late 2019, these units were replaced by Class 755s and transferred to Transport for Wales by February 2020.

=== West Midlands Railway/London Midland ===
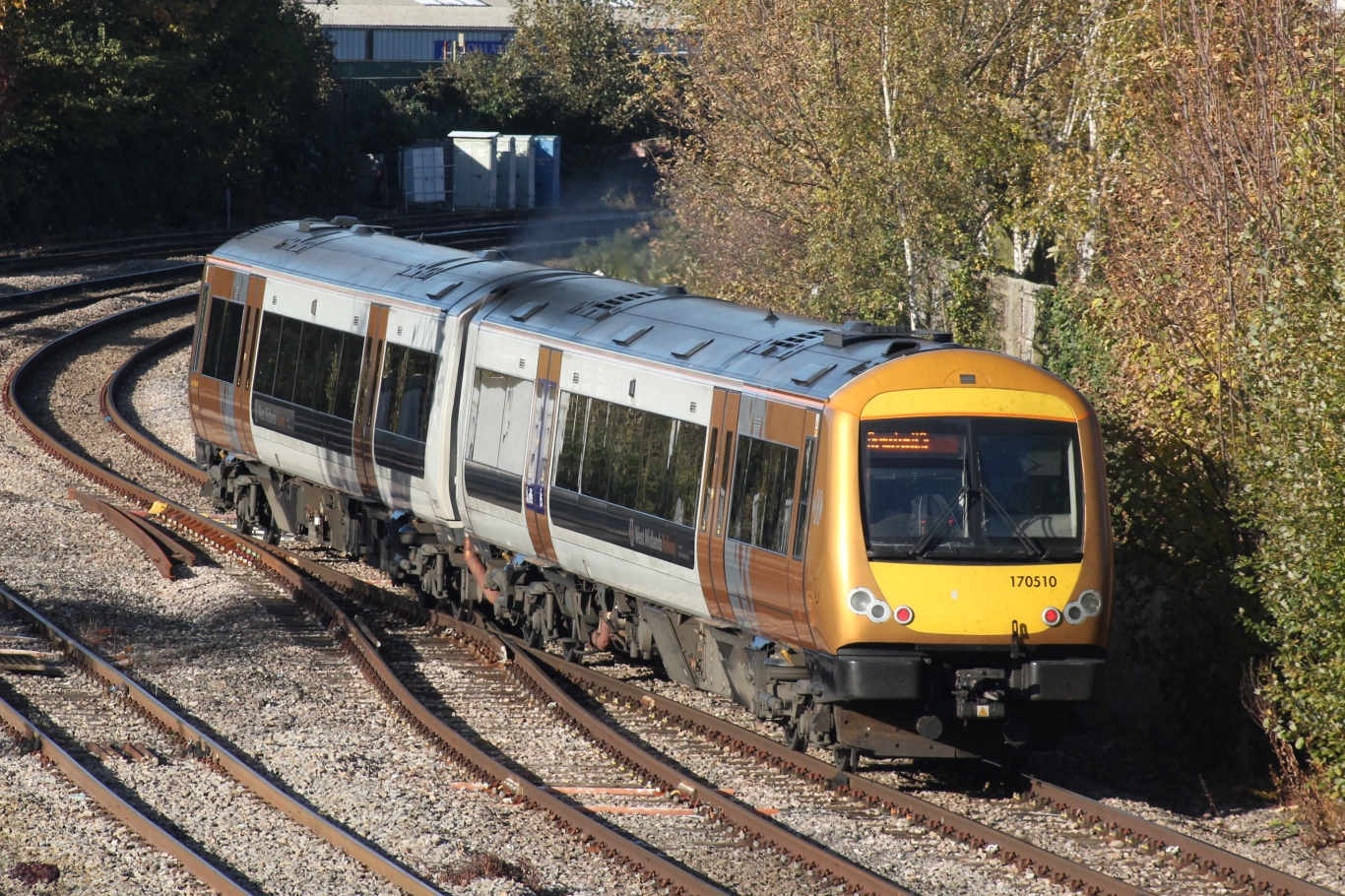
West Midlands Trains Class 170/5 at Hereford in 2018

West Midlands Trains (WMT) operated twenty-three Class 170 Turbostars, which they had inherited from their predecessor London Midland in 2017, on services on the Birmingham to Hereford via Bromsgrove Line, and Birmingham - Shrewsbury via Telford Central services.

WMT replaced all of its 170s with 26 new Class 196 Civity units from late 2022. However, these 170s had already started moving to East Midlands Railway (EMR) in 2021, with the first moving in February 2021. The final four ex-WMT 170s joined EMR in May 2023.

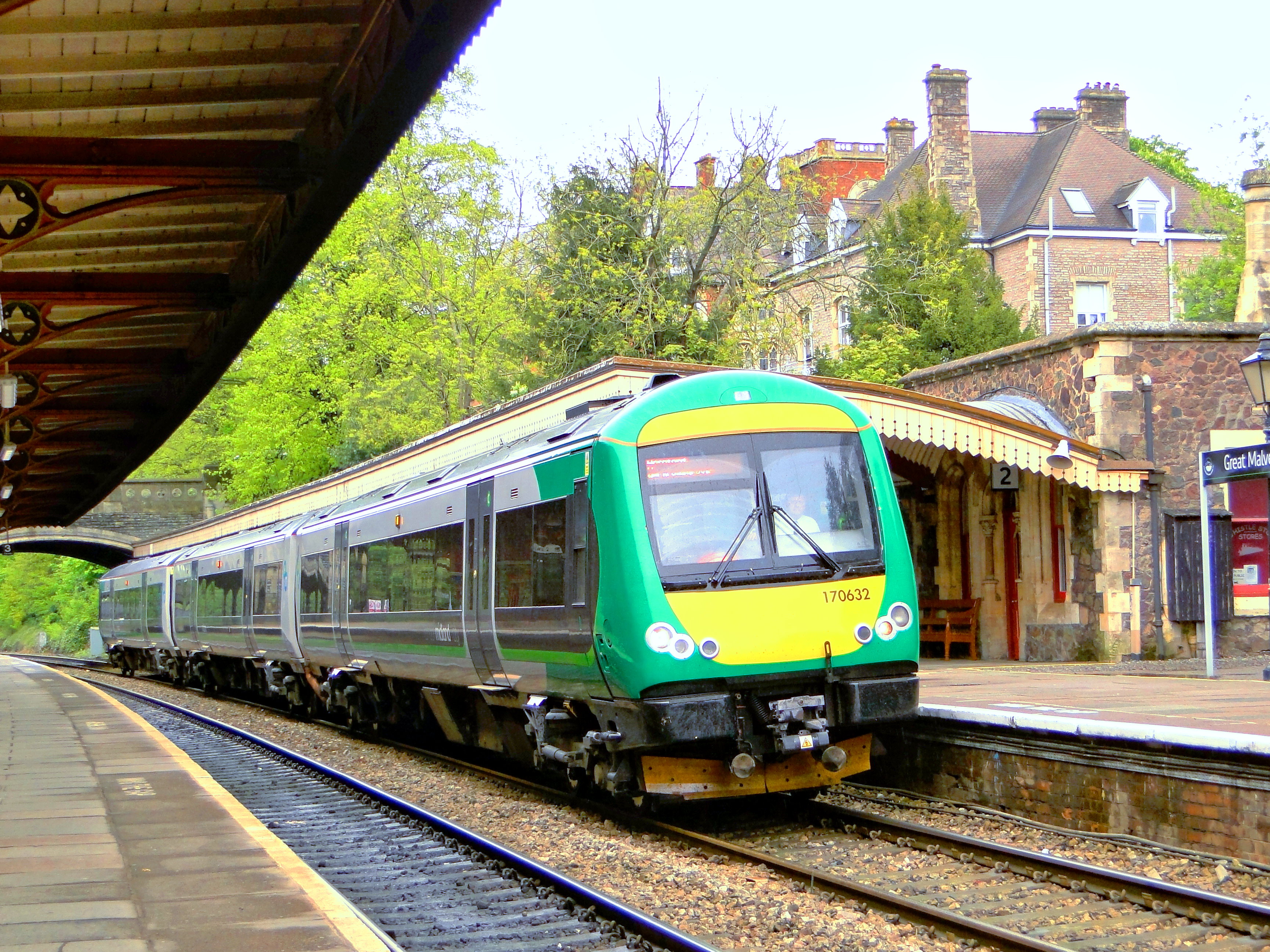
London Midland Class 170/6 at Great Malvern in 2013

For the vast majority of the duration that these 23 170s were operated on the West Midlands franchise, they were formed as 17 two-car 170/5s and six three-car 170/6s. However, in 2021, before they had all transferred to EMR, the centre cars of what were WMT's six Class 170/6s moved to CrossCountry, to enable it to strengthen some of its previously-two-car units, meaning that EMR received the ex-WMT 170s as 23 two-car 170/5s, as they only leased the driving cars (with CrossCountry's lengthened units changing subclass from 170/5 to 170/6).

=== Transport for Wales ===
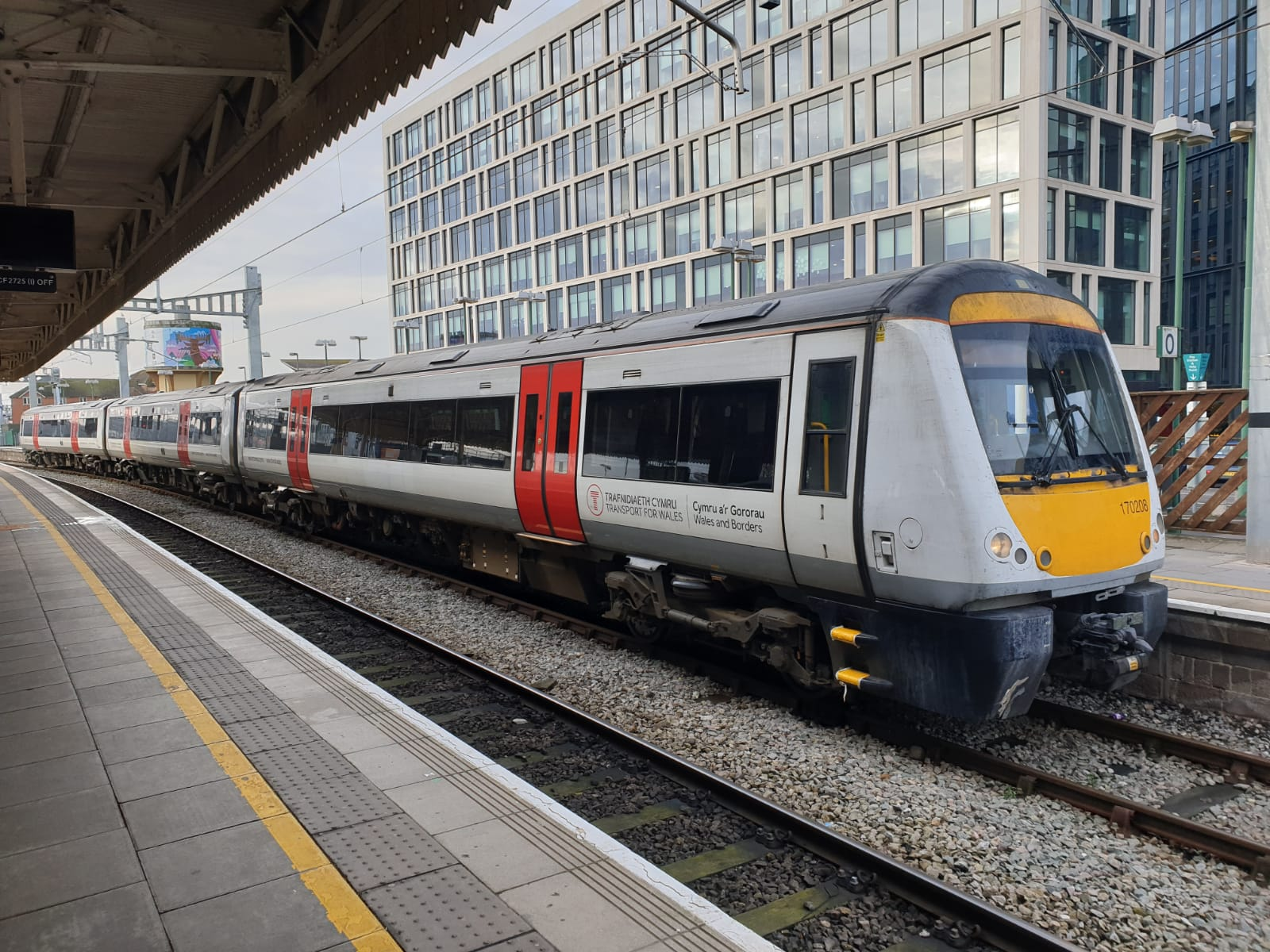
Transport for Wales Class 170/2 at Cardiff Central in 2019

In September 2019, Transport for Wales received three Class 170/2s (one three-car unit and two two-car units) from Abellio Greater Anglia, with driver training following. In November 2019, three more units (two three-car and one two-car) transferred depots from Norwich Crown Point to Cardiff Canton, with a further four three-car units delivered in December 2019, the last three-car unit delivered in January 2020 and the last two-car unit delivered in February 2020. This meant that Transport for Wales Rail leased the entire 12-strong 170/2 subclass of eight three-car units and four two-car units.

These were the first Class 170s on the Wales & Borders franchise and they were used on services between Cardiff / Bridgend and Ebbw Vale, and services between Maesteg and Cheltenham/Gloucester. On 12 December 2019, three-car unit 170202 worked TfW Rail's first Class 170 passenger services (between Bridgend and Ebbw Vale Town via Cardiff Central) and the units started to enter service in multiple quantities on 16 December 2019, with 5 units (three three-car and two two-car) running in passenger service on that day. All units had entered service by April 2020 when three-car unit 170206 was the last to enter service.

These were originally due to stay with TfW for the duration of the franchise (albeit working different services once their brand new trains were in service), however, following a revision of TfW's long-term rolling stock strategy, it was later announced all were to transfer to East Midlands Railway. The two-car units transferred first, followed by the three-car units. 170208 was the last to leave, on 29 January 2024.

== Fleet details ==
Class	Operator	Qty.	Built	Cars per unit	Unit numbers	Notes
170/1	CrossCountry	10	1998–1999	3	170101–170110	
170/1	CrossCountry	7	1998–1999	2	170111–170117	
170/2	East Midlands Railway	8	1999	3	170201–170208	
170/2	East Midlands Railway	4	2002	2	170270–170273	
170/3	Converted to Class 168	9	2000	2	170301–170309	
170/3	Converted to Class 171	1	2000	2	170392	
170/3	ScotRail	4	2004	3	170393–170396	
170/3	CrossCountry	2	2002	3	170397–170398	
170/4	ScotRail	17	1999–2001	3	170401–170415, 170470–170471	
170/4	East Midlands Railway	8	1999–2001	3	170416–170420, 170422–170424	Units numbered 170422–170424 were formerly Southern Class 171s
170/4	Converted to Class 171	1	1999–2001	3	170421	To remain with GTR as Class 171
170/4	ScotRail	10	2003–2004	3	170425–170434	
170/4	ScotRail	3	2004–2005	3	170450–170452	
170/4	Northern Trains	16	2004–2005	3	170453–170461, 170472–170478	
170/5	East Midlands Railway	23	1999–2000	2	170501–170517, 170530–170535	Units numbered 170530–170535 were formerly three-car units numbered 170630–170635 until 2020–2021
170/6	CrossCountry	10	1999–2000	3	170618–170623, 170636–170639	Units numbered 170618–170623 were formerly two-car units numbered 170518–170523 until 2020–2021
170/7	Converted to Class 171	6	2003-2004	2	170721–170726	

== Named units ==
A number of units have been named:

- 170398: Turbostar Partnership 300
- 170407: University of Aberdeen
- 170417: The Key Worker
- 170622: Pride of Leicester

== Accidents and incidents ==
- On 13 November 2005, unit 170207 collided with a car at a level crossing in Swainsthorpe, Norfolk, on the Great Eastern Main Line. The car driver was killed. The front of the train was damaged by the consequent fire from the wrecked car.
- On 26 November 2005, unit 170431 hit a landslide near Moy on the Highland Main Line. The front of the train was derailed and damaged by the debris, the other two coaches remained railed. Six passengers, the driver and conductor were injured.
- On 12 September 2006, unit 170206 was derailed as it crossed the level crossing at Croxton, Norfolk, on the Breckland Line. A panel that formed part of the level crossing had become dislodged and fouled both railway and road.
- On 27 July 2011, unit 170393 derailed after crossing over a set of faulty points at Princes Street Gardens on the approach to Edinburgh. The train was occupied only by two members of crew - neither of whom was injured.
- On 14 July 2013, unit 170272 collided with a car towing a trailer on a level crossing at Woodbridge, Suffolk, on the East Suffolk Line.
- On 10 April 2016, unit 170204 collided with an agricultural tractor on a level crossing at Roudham, on the Breckland line. The tractor driver was seriously injured; the train driver and some passengers sustained minor injuries. An investigation revealed that the tractor driver had obtained permission to cross the line.
- On 15 October 2017, unit 170272 collided with a car on a level crossing at Melton, on the East Suffolk Line. The car driver was airlifted to hospital.
- On 10 October 2018, unit 170402 derailed at Stonehaven, from Aberdeen to Dundee.
- On 3 March 2019, unit 170520 collided with a fallen tree on the line running from Lydney to Gloucester and derailed. The front cab was severely damaged.
- On 23 March 2020, unit 170107 collided with locomotive 66057, which had run through a buffer stop at the end of a siding at Bromsgrove and ended up foul of the running line. None of the two crew and four passengers on board were injured. The driver of the locomotive was subsequently convicted of an offence contrary to the Health and Safety at Work etc. Act 1974. He was sentenced to 8 months' imprisonment, suspended for 18 months.
