= Dairycoates =

Area of Kingston upon Hull in the East Riding of Yorkshire, England

Coordinates: 53.7309°N 0.3790°W

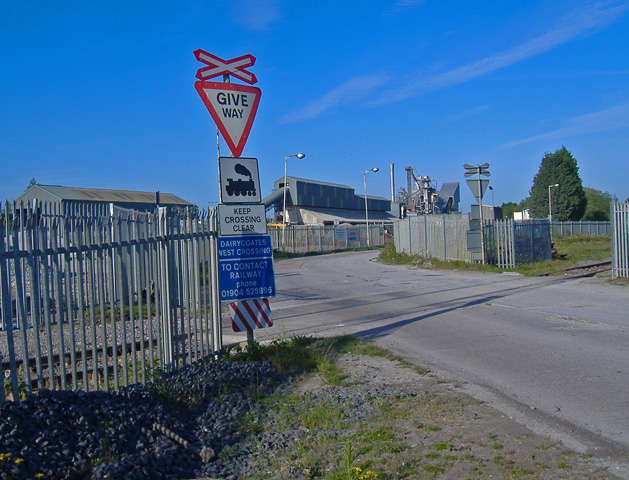
Level crossing and Asphalt Concrete plant, Freightliner Road, Dairycoates (2007)

Dairycoates is an area of Kingston upon Hull, East Riding of Yorkshire, England, a former hamlet.

The area was formerly the site of a major North Eastern Railway engine shed, Dairycoates Engine Shed (est.1862, closed 1970). Most of the Dairycoates area is now in industrial use, including the Brighton Street Industrial Estate, located on former rail use land.

== Geography ==
Dairycoates is located roughly halfway between the town centres of Hull and Hessle, at the western edge of the Hessle Road urban area, and its junction with the A1166; Gipsyville is immediately to the west, and contains the Dairycoates Industrial Estate; the two areas are separated by the Hull to Selby railway line which runs to Paragon station and the Hull Docks. Hawthorn Avenue connects northward to the Anlaby Road area of Hull.

Most of the modern area is used for industrial activity, including the Brighton Street Industrial Estate on Freightliner Road. The modern A63 runs through the south of the area; to the south is the St Andrews Quay retail park.

== History ==
Dairycoates Lodge was constructed 1809 by Antony Atkinson, merchant. Only three persons were recorded at Dairycoates in Edward Baines' 1823 Gazetteer: two persons involved in brick and tile manufacturing including Anthony Atkinson, and a farmer. Hawthorn Avenue (then Chalk Lane) was built sometime after 1824. The Hull and Selby Railway was constructed through the area in the 1830s. In 1846 a branch line, the Hull and Bridlington Branch Line was constructed from the Hull and Selby Line at a junction at Dairycoates.

An engine shed was first established in 1862. The shed was expanded during the late 19th and early 20th century into one of the largest on the North Eastern Railway's system. Two square roundhouse sheds were added 1876.

In the 1850s the area contained only the railway lines; the hamlet (farm) of Dairy Coates, located within the triangle of land formed by the junctions of the railway lines; a brick and tile works to the east; and further east, the houses Dairy Coates Grange, and Dairy Coates Lodge; the land was in agricultural use, and the only roads the east west Hessle and North Ferriby Turnpike (later "Hessle Road"), and Chalk Lane, running north off it. The area was adjacent to the Humber Estuary bank, and the Hull railway ran alongside the bank. Much of the area was within the (detached) parish of North Ferriby.

Sheahan recorded a residence Dairycoates Villa, on the Humber bank within the boundaries of Hull, and beyond it Dairycoates Lodge. Dairycoates Inn was built in 1874. A wagon works, Newington Wagon Works (later Hull Cart, Wagon & Iron Company) was established in 1879, east of the Bridlington railway line and south of Hessle Road.

To the south of the railway line St Andrew's Dock was opened in 1883 (expanded 1890s), on land reclaimed from the Humber. The Hull and Barnsley Railway opened in 1885, with branch line passing through the area to a freight terminus, Neptune Street goods station. By the 1890s Dairycoates Grange and Lodge had been demolished, replaced by the expansion of the railway lines. By the same period the westwards urban growth of Hull along Hessle Road had reached the area. By the first decade of the 20th century the urban extent of Hull had become continuous westwards as far as Dairycoates, with the Hull and Bridlington Branch Line coincident with the western boundary of urban growth. The industrial development and housing later known as Gipsyville, west of Dairycoates had begun by this period. The general pattern of development remained constant through much of the 20th century, whilst Hull grew westwards into Gipsyville and towards Hessle and Anlaby.

A church, St Mary and St Peter was established on Hessle Road in 1902, north of the wagon works; in 1906 it became a chapelry of the parish of Newington (deconsecrated and demolished, 1962). (Note: The church of St Mary and St Peter was demolished due to road improvement; a new church was built on the opposite side of the road. The church closed 1969.) In 1912 the Eureka cinema opened on Hessle Road (closed 1959). (see also Closed cinemas in Kingston upon Hull).

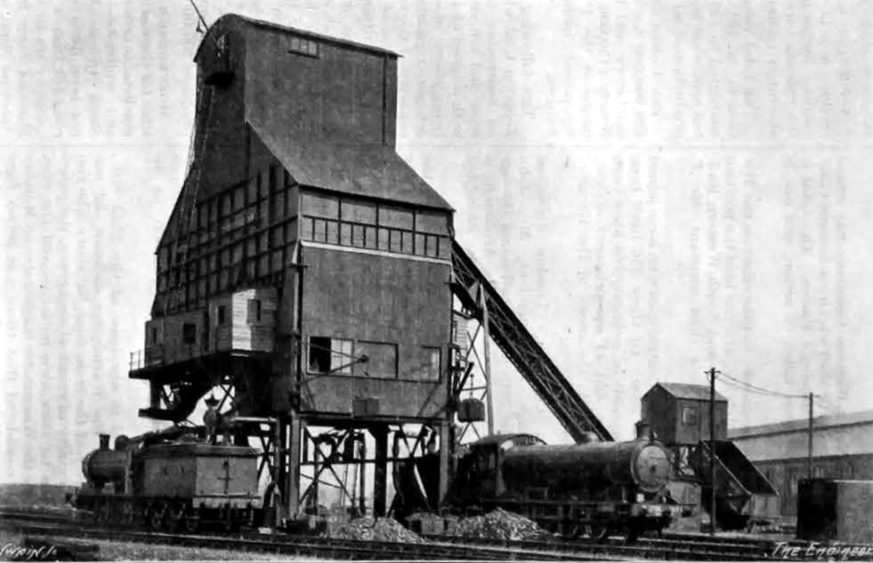
Mechanical coaling plant 1916

The Dairycoates engine shed was expanded by the addition of a third shed in 1915/16. A mechanical coaling plant was also added in the same period. At the 1923 Grouping the overall facility contained 6 roundhouses, and a straight shed, with a capacity of 150 engines.

In 1962 the level crossing (Hessle Road (Dairycoates) level crossing) at the eastern edge of the area was replaced with a road flyover (the "Hessle Road flyover" or "Dairycoates flyover") at a cost of over £800,000 to reduce road congestion. Nearly £500,000 was contributed by the government, and nearly £140,000 by the British Transport Commission. (Note: By the 1990s the flyover was affected by Concrete degradation due to reinforcement corrosion and was reinforced by the conversion of the voids in the approaches into arches. The main concrete deck span has also required reinforcement, strengthening work was carried out in the late 2000s.)

The Dairycoates engine shed closed in 1970. Tilcon built a rail connected asphalt concrete plant in the 1970s. As of 2013 the plant is operated by Tarmac, with the rail connection operated by DB Cargo UK. Supplied (2009) with stone from Rylstone. The Neptune Street goods branch of the former Hull and Barnsley line also had been closed and removed by the 1970s.

By the 1990s the former railway and engine shed land had been redeveloped as an industrial estate. Birds Eye opened a pea processing facility on the estate in 2007.

A Lidl supermarket was built in the 2000s over a site including the demolished former Eureka picture palace. In 2016 Lidl announced it intended to close its supermarket and build a larger one across from the previous site nearer to Brighton Street.

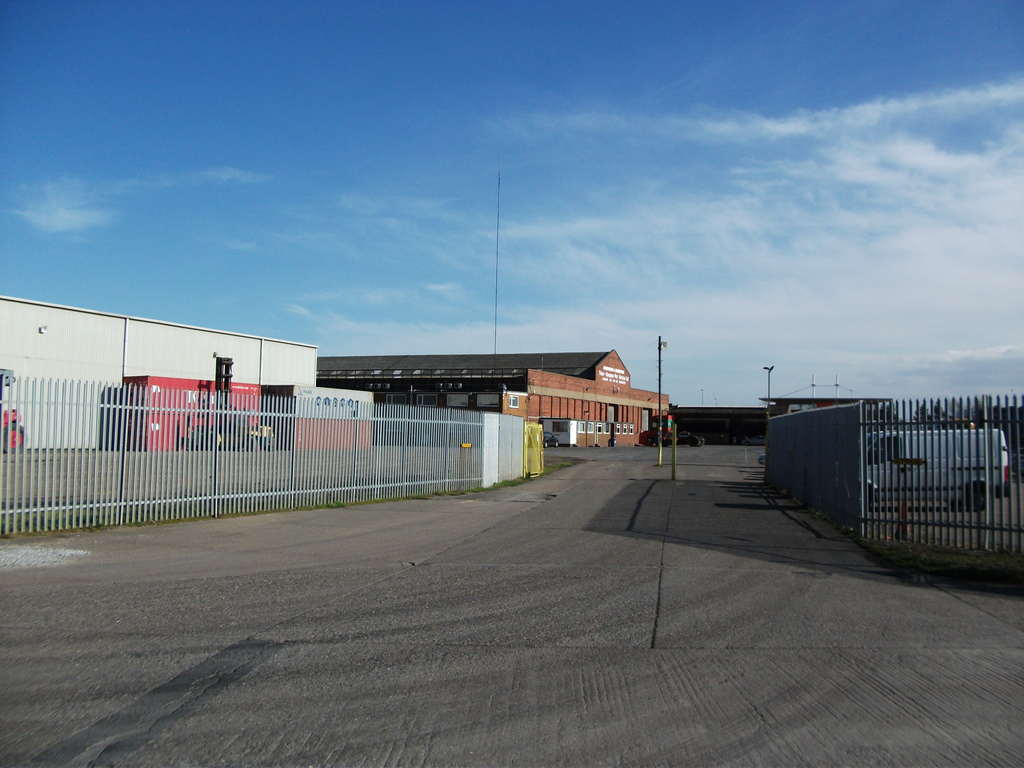
Dairycoates engine shed building, used for storage/warehousing (2011)

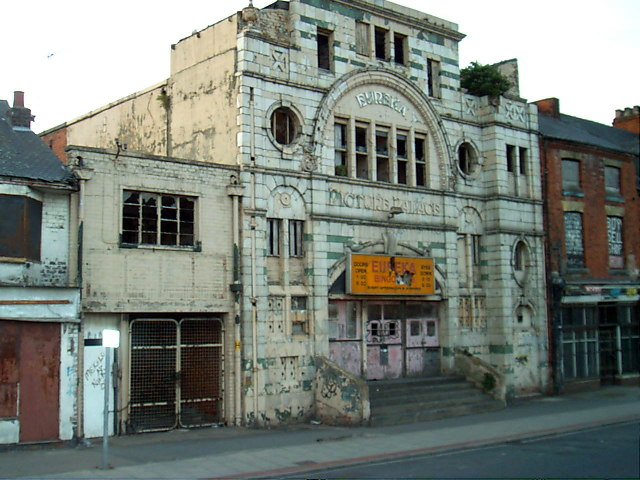
Derelict former Eureka picture palace (2005)

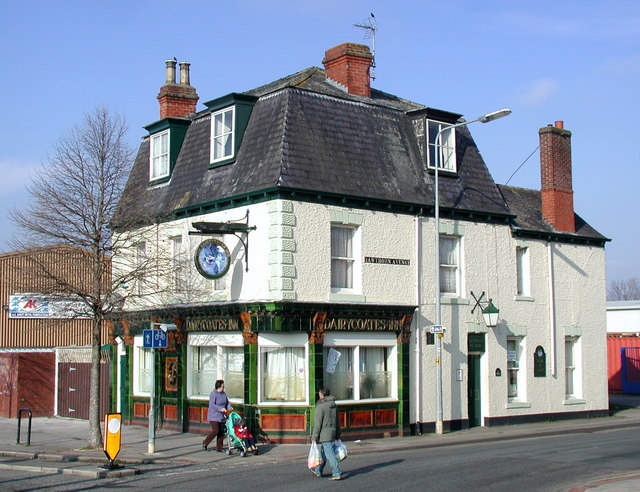
Dairycoates Inn (2009)

== See also ==
- For the nearby Dairycoates Industrial Estate, see Gipsyville.
