= Listed buildings in Kingston upon Hull (Avenue Ward) =

Avenue Ward is a ward in the city and unitary authority of Kingston upon Hull, East Riding of Yorkshire, England. It contains 36 listed buildings that are recorded in the National Heritage List for England. All the listed buildings are designated at Grade II, the lowest of the three grades, which is applied to "buildings of national importance and special interest". The ward is a residential area to the northwest of the centre of the city. In the ward are Pearson Park, Hull General Cemetery and Hull Western Cemetery, and the area known as The Avenues, all of which contain listed buildings. Elsewhere, most of the listed buildings are houses, and the others include a public house, two ornamental fountains, a school and a former school, two churches and a church tower, a former vicarage, a shop, and a pair of telephone kiosks.

== Buildings ==
Name and location	Photograph	Date	Notes
Gateway and walls, General Cemetery; 53.75140°N 0.36546°W		1847	The gateway and walls were designed by Cuthbert Brodrick, and are in stone and yellow brick with stone dressings. There are three cross-gabled piers in Gothic style, with cusped ogee-headed niches, and stepped broaches with finials. Between them is a pair of traceried cast iron gates, and to the right is a small single gate. The flanking walls have chamfered coping, and brick piers with rock-faced stone caps.
Cholera memorial, General Cemetery; 53.75189°N 0.36739°W		c. 1850	The memorial commemorates those who died in the cholera epidemic of 1848–49. It is in stone, and consists of a tall square obelisk on a square base. The base has a moulded top and base, it contains a panel on each face, and stands on two steps.
Gateway, Pearson Park; 53.75964°N 0.35128°W		1860	The gateway is in cast iron, and consists of a main central arch flanked by pedestrian entrances. The main arch has square piers with scrolled openwork panels, pedestal bases and Corinthian capitals. On the inner sides of the piers are pilasters carrying a moulded round arch with a keystone and decorated spandrels. There is an enriched entablature with a cornice, and pilasters on the outer sides of the piers have cartouches with the city arms. Flanking the entrance are four panelled square piers, and each has a dolphin foliate finial.
East Lodge, Pearson Park; 53.75947°N 0.35130°W		1860–61	The lodge, later a private house, is in yellow brick on a plinth, with dressings in stone and blue brick, quoins, a floor band, dentilled brick eaves, and a slate roof. There are two storeys, and L-shaped plan, with one bay and a cross-wing on the right. On the front is a canted bay window, above which is a casement window under a relieving arch, and a gable with a traceried bargeboard. In the angle of the cross-wing is a doorway.
54 Pearson Park; 53.76033°N 0.35373°W		1862	The house is in yellow brick on a plinth, with stucco dressings, sill bands, dentilled eaves and a hipped roof. There are two storeys and a basement, and five bays, the left bay projecting under a dentilled open pediment. On the ground floor of the left wing is a round-cornered bay window, and above are paired round-arched windows with moulded heads, corbels and keystones. To the right is a six-bay cast iron verandah, with round posts linked by a latticework railing. Behind is a doorway with pilasters and two French windows. Above is a round-arched window and two segmental-headed windows, all with moulded surrounds and keystones. To the right is a recessed two-storey bay.
Studley House; 53.75973°N 0.35586°W		1862	The house is in yellow brick on a plinth, with dressings in stucco and stone, sill and lintel bands, modillion wooden eaves, and a hipped slate roof. There are two storeys and attics, and five bays. In the centre is a stucco portico with panelled pilasters, an enriched frieze and a modillion cornice, and a doorway with sidelights and a fanlight. This is flanked by canted bay windows with enriched pilasters, a frieze and a modillion cornice. The upper floor contains sash windows with segmental heads and moulded lintels, and above are three roof dormers.
Cupola, Pearson Park; 53.75848°N 0.35673°W		1862–66	The cupola was designed by Cuthbert Brodrick, and was removed from the old town hall and resited in the park when it was demolished in 1912. It is in stone, and has a circular base of three steps, on which is a drum with moulded round-arched openings, and a deep cornice with moulded brackets. Above, is an ogee dome with moulded oval openings and a wavy incised line over them. At the top is a fluted cap and an elaborate lead finial.
50 Pearson Park; 53.76008°N 0.35466°W		1863	A house, later used for other purposes, in yellow brick on a plinth, with painted stucco dressings, rusticated quoins, a modillion eaves cornice, and a hipped slate roof. There are two storeys and five bays. The middle bay is recessed, and the outer bays have hipped roofs. In the centre is a Corinthian portico with panelled pilasters, an enriched frieze and a cornice, and it contains a shouldered opening, and a doorway with sidelights and a fanlight. This is flanked by canted bay windows, and on the upper floor are sash windows with moulded surrounds and keystones.
Statue of Queen Victoria, Pearson Park; 53.75840°N 0.35499°W		1863	The statue, by Thomas Earle, is in white marble. It depicts Queen Victoria as a seated figure on a rectangular pedestal with a moulded plinth and a cornice. On the sides are recessed panels containing coats of arms, and on the front is an inscription. The statue is enclosed by patterned cast iron railings with rounded corners and corner posts in the form of lions.
Drinking fountain, Pearson Park; 53.75779°N 0.35555°W		1864	The drinking fountain is in cast iron on a stone plinth. It has a central stem with a vine trail ornament and figures of lizards, and a bulbous top and conical round bowl. At the top is a square pierced canopy surmounted by a pierced dome, carried on round posts. There is an elaborate cusped round-headed opening on each side, and above each opening is a roundel with an inscription.
Monument to Captain John Gravill, General Cemetery; 53.75248°N 0.36165°W		1865	The monument is to John Gravill, the captain of the whaling ship Diana, who died when the ship was frozen in the ice of the Davis Strait. It is in white marble, and is enclosed by low marble walls. At the head is a square monument with a stepped and moulded base. On the front is an inscription, and a moulded cap with an oval carved relief showing the ship stuck in ice. The monument is surmounted by a partially draped urn.
The St Johns Hotel; 53.76141°N 0.35219°W		1865	A public house on a corner site in red brick, with bracketed eaves and a hipped Welsh slate roof. There are two storeys, five bays on the front and three on the left return. On the front, and extending round the corner is a pub front with Corinthian pilasters, a deep fascia board, pub windows, and a canted doorway on the corner. The other windows are sashes.
Gothic monument (east), General Cemetery; 53.75223°N 0.36245°W		1860s	The monument is in cast iron, in Gothic style, and is in the form of an Eleanor Cross, on a stone base. Each face has a pointed-arched opening with a gable, and is flanked by corner pinnacles. Above, there is an octagonal corona with eight lancets, gables and pinnacles, surmounted by an octagonal spire.
Gothic monument (west), General Cemetery; 53.75168°N 0.36622°W		1860s	The monument is in cast iron, in Gothic style, and is in the form of an Eleanor Cross, on a stone base. Each face has a pointed-arched opening with a gable, and is flanked by corner pinnacles. Above, there is an octagonal corona with eight lancets, gables and pinnacles, surmounted by an octagonal spire.
Statue of Prince Albert, Pearson Park; 53.75915°N 0.35504°W		1868	The statue, by Thomas Earle, is in white marble. It depicts Prince Albert as a standing figure on square pedestal, with a moulded plinth and a cornice. On the sides are recessed panels with shields. The statue stands on a square granite base with a string course.
Fountain at junction with Salisbury Road; 53.75663°N 0.36551°W		c. 1875	The ornamental fountain is in cast iron. It has a cruciform base and an octagonal pedestal, with four scroll brackets containing four figures of mermaids blowing conches. Above is a shallow round basin with lily leaf decoration in relief. On this is a smaller octagonal pedestal with four figures of herons, and a smaller shallow basin containing a scroll bracketed spout.
Fountain at junction with Salisbury Street; 53.75801°N 0.36573°W		c. 1875	The ornamental fountain is in cast iron. It has a cruciform base and an octagonal pedestal, with four scroll brackets containing four figures of mermaids blowing conches. Above is a shallow round basin with lily leaf decoration in relief. On this is a smaller octagonal pedestal with four figures of herons, and a smaller shallow basin containing a scroll bracketed spout.
107 Park Avenue; 53.75778°N 0.36609°W		1877–79	The house, later converted into flats, was designed by George Gilbert Scott Jr. in Queen Anne style. It is in brick on a plinth, with string courses, pargeted panels, rebated eaves, a moulded gutter and brackets, and a hipped tile roof. There are two storeys and attics, and five bays. In the centre is a round-arched doorcase with multiple keystones and a hood mould, above which is an opening under a pediment, and a doorway with a fanlight, Over this is a sash window, and a tall dormer with a hipped roof containing a sash window with a segmental head. The outer bays contain square bay windows with shaped parapets, and above are sash windows and hipped dormers.
1 Salisbury Street; 53.75703°N 0.36588°W		1877–79	The house, later converted into flats, was designed by George Gilbert Scott Jr. in Queen Anne style. It is in brick on a plinth, with string courses, pargeted panels, a pargeted frieze on the returns, rebated eaves, and a hipped tile roof. There are two storeys and attics, and three bays. The middle bay is recessed, and contains a doorcase with brick keystones and a cornice, and a doorway with a three-light mullioned fanlight and a cornice. Above is a sash window, and a hipped dormer. The outer bays each contains a square bay window, above which is a sash window and a shouldered shaped gable.
3 and 5 Salisbury Street; 53.75733°N 0.36598°W		1877–79	A pair of houses, later converted into flats, designed by George Gilbert Scott Jr. in Queen Anne style. They are on a plinth, with string courses, pargeted panels, rebated eaves, and hipped tile roofs. There are two storeys and attics, and six bays, and they form a half-H shaped plan. The middle section is recessed, and enclosed by a pargeted brick wall with a string course and coping, and contain two doorways with segmental heads. Behind are sash windows with pargeted aprons, and above are four hipped dormers. The flanking bays each contain a square bay window, above which are sash windows, a dormer with a wavy lintel band, and a pedimented shaped gable containing a small window.
7 Salisbury Street; 53.75764°N 0.36598°W		1877–79	The house was designed by George Gilbert Scott Jr. in Queen Anne style. It is in brick on a plinth, with string courses, pargeted panels, rebated eaves, a moulded gutter and brackets, and a hipped tile roof. There are two storeys and attics, and three bays. The middle bay is recessed, and contains a doorcase with a cornice, and a doorway with a three-light fanlight. Above is a sash window, and a hipped dormer. The outer bays each contains a square bay window with a shaped parapet, above which is a sash window and a shouldered shaped gable containing a window.
International House; 53.75681°N 0.36602°W		1877–79	Two houses on a corner site, designed by George Gilbert Scott Jr. in Queen Anne style. Each house is in brick on a plinth, with string courses, pargeted panels, rebated eaves, a moulded gutter and brackets, and a hipped tile roof, and there are different architectural details between the houses. They have two storeys and attics, and three bays. Between the houses is a link building added in the 20th century, with two storeys and containing sash windows.
Former Park Avenue Industrial School for Girls and walls 53.75807°N 0.37184°W		1888	The school, later used for other purposes, is in brick, with dressings in shaped and moulded brick and stone, and tile roofs with red ridge tiles. There is a U-shaped plan, with a main range, and flanking gabled cross-wings. The main range has two storeys and nine bays. In the centre is a projecting two-storey porch with a Dutch gable, containing an entrance with a moulded brick surround and an arched fanlight. Above it is an inscribed cartouche, two moulded string courses, and a sash window with a curved head, under a cambered arch with a keystone. The flanking bays contain paired windows and an upper floor sill band. The cross-wings also contain paired windows, and above them, the moulded brickwork forms an open pediment with a dentilled cornice, framing a cartouche. On each cross-wing is an ornate timber ventilation cupola with a finial. In front, there is a low stone coped brick wall and three pairs of gate posts, and behind, the grounds are enclosed by a rendered wall with stone copings.
32 Pearson Park; 53.75686°N 0.35666°W		1892–93	The right of a pair of semi-detached houses, it is in orange brick with a roof of orange tile. There are three storeys, two bays, and a rear outshut. The left bay projects and is gabled. On the ground floor is a square bay window, and above it is a narrower square bay window. The top floor contains a Venetian window, above which are overhanging eaves, and moulded bargeboards on shaped timber corbels. The right bay has a two-storey porch with a pyramidal roof. It contains an arched doorway with pilasters, a giant inscribed keystone, decorative spandrels, and a moulded cornice. Above it is a casement window and a gabled roof dormer. The house was at one time the home of the poet Philip Larkin.
Hymers College; 53.74954°N 0.36543°W		1893	A school that has been extended. The original part is in brick with stone dressings and tile roofs, and is in Jacobean Revival style. It has a plinth, string courses, lintel and sill bands, shouldered and coped gables, and most of the windows are mullioned. The main block has two storeys and attics, and 13 bays. On the front is a polychrome porch with a segmental broken pediment and a coat of arms, and a round-arched entrance with a keystone. On the roof is a square clock turret with a gallery and a round cupola with an ogee lead dome and a cross finial. The northern block, added in 1897, has two storeys and six bays, the 1907 addition has two storeys and eight bays, and there is a memorial hall added in 1923.
Pearson Memorial, Pearson Park; 53.75853°N 0.35581°W		1897	The memorial commemorates Zachariah Pearson who gave the money for the park. It consists of an unworked column of natural rock, on the east side of which is an oval marble portrait medallion and an inscription.
Elim Church, Sunday School and wall 53.75413°N 0.35938°W		1897–99	The church is in brick with stone dressings and a slate roof. It consists of a nave with a clerestory, aisles, transepts, and porches. The northwest front has a bell tower on the left, and on the right is a buttress rising to a crocketed pinnacle. Between them are three gabled bays containing two doorways with four-centred arches. Above them is a round-headed lancet window flanked by double-lancets with elliptical-arched heads, above which is a round window. The Sunday school to the left has one storey, a cruciform plan, and is surmounted by an open bell turret with a square dome and a finial. The boundary wall is in brick with stone coping and wrought iron railings, and has two gateways.
41 Queens Road; 53.76052°N 0.35577°W		1899–1900	A vicarage, later used for other purposes, it was designed by Temple Moore. The building is in brown brick, with dressings in red brick and painted stone, and a tile roof. There are two storeys and attics, and six bays. The windows are sashes with shaped lintels, and above are three roof dormers. To the left is a single-storey porch.
Former butcher's shop 53.75370°N 0.36043°W		Late 19th or early 20th century	The shop on a corner site, later used for other purposes, is in brick with a modern roof. There are two storeys and a front of two bays. Extending round the corner is a shopfront with a moulded cornice on moulded consoles on piers of green glazed bricks, and there are similar bricks on the stall risers. To the right is a recessed doorway to the living accommodation. On the upper floor is a canted bay window, and sash windows, and above are three gabled roof dormers. Inside the former shop, the walls are entirely tiled in a decorative scheme, including painted tiles designed to look like framed pictures.
Memorial to Captain George Henry Smith, Hull Western Cemetery; 53.75223°N 0.37602°W		1904	The memorial commemorates Captain George Henry Smith, who was killed in the Dogger Bank incident. It is in white limestone, and is a pedestal monument on a double plinth, with cornices in the form of roofed pointed arches. On the top is a sculpture of an anchor and chain resting against a rock. There are inscriptions of two of the faces.
Memorial to William Richard Leggett, Hull Western Cemetery; 53.75221°N 0.37594°W		1904	The memorial commemorates William Richard Leggett, who was killed in the Dogger Bank incident. It is in white limestone, and is a pedestal monument on a double plinth, with cornices in the form of roofed pointed arches. On the top is a sculpture of an anchor and chain resting against a rock. On the east face are inscriptions, and above them is an inscribed side view of a trawler at sea.
Methodist Church Tower; 53.75494°N 0.35977°W		1905	The church tower is in red brick with stone dressings. There are two stages, a plinth, diagonal and central buttresses, the diagonal ones rising to octagonal pinnacles with niches and domed tops. On the south side is a doorway and windows, all round-headed. The upper stage has brick and stone banding, and double lancet bell openings in moulded segmental arches. Above is an octagonal spire with a panelled band and a ball finial. At the foot of the tower is a southwest porch with a shallow gable and a parapet. It contains a pointed doorway with a hood mould, flanked by buttresses with panelled pedestals. The rest of the church has been rebuilt.
Gravestone of Edward Booth, Hull Western Cemetery; 53.75205°N 0.37046°W		1906	The gravestone is to the memory of Edward Booth, a railway fireman, who was killed in an accident at Ulleskelf railway station. The gravestone is in York stone, and is lancet-shaped, on a stone plinth, with a chamfered upper surface. Along the arch is sculpted ivy, and below is a recessed panel containing a sculpture of a locomotive in relief, under which an inscription.
31 Queens Road; 53.76099°N 0.35533°W		1908–09	At one time the St Vincent's Boys Home, and later used for other purposes, it is in brown brick, with dressings in red brick and stone, on a plinth, with a floor band, corner pilasters with red brick quoins and slate roofs. The main block has four storeys and attics, and five bays, the middle three bays projecting. The central bay rises higher and contains a canted two-storey bay window on the top two floors with an embattled parapet. On the ground floor are a pair of canted bay windows, and most of the other windows are cross casements. To the left is a wing with three storeys and eight bays.
St Vincent De Paul's Church; 53.76060°N 0.35549°W		1932	The church is in brick with pantile roofs, and is in Romanesque style. It consists of a nave with a clerestory and a chancel under a continuous roof, aisles with internal chapels, porches, a vestry, and a campanile to the southwest. The campanile as a square plan and four stages, and contains flat-headed windows, and rebated corners in the lower stages. At the top of the third stage are corbelled-out turrets. The top stage is corniced and octagonal, and contains two-light bell openings with a central shaft. Above is a recessed canted roof with a cross.
Pair of telephone kiosks 53.75507°N 0.35903°W		From 1968	The telephone kiosks at the junction of Princes Avenue and Park Grove are is of the K8 type designed by Bruce Martin. They are in cast iron with an aluminium door, they have a square plan and are painted cream. There is a flat domed roof, under which are rectangular panels with rounded corners containing "TELEPHONE".
