= Mary Letitia Martin =

Irish writer (1815–1850)

Mary Letitia Martin (1815–1850) was an Irish writer who was known as the "Princess of Connemara". Educated at home in the upper-class style, she was fluent in numerous languages. She published two books in her lifetime, and a third was published posthumously.

After losing her fortune during the Great Famine, Martin and her husband went to Belgium for a time, where she contributed to periodicals. They sailed to America in 1850, but Martin died 10 days after arrival due to complications of premature childbirth.

== Biography ==
Martin was born into the chief landowning family of Connemara, the Martins of Ballynahinch Castle, a branch of the Martyn Tribe of Galway. Her parents were Thomas Barnwall Martin and Julia Kirwin; her paternal grandfather was Richard Martin MP (1754–1834).

Educated at home and by herself, Martin became fluent in Irish, English, French and a number of other languages. According to Maria Edgeworth, who had met her during her tour of Connemara in 1833, she was courted in 1834 by Count Adolphe de Werdinsky, whom she had met in London earlier that year. She refused to marry and de Werdinsky feigned a suicide attempt at Ballynahinch.

Martin published her first novel, St. Etienne, a Tale of the Vendean War, in 1845.

In 1847, she married a cousin, Colonel Arthur Gonne Bell. He took the name of Martin on marriage, by Royal Licence. In the same year, her father died of famine fever contracted while visiting his tenants in the Clifden workhouse.

== Famine ==
On the death of her father, Martin inherited a heavily encumbered estate of 200,000 acres (810 km^{2}). In the following two years, her remaining fortune was destroyed in the famine as she attempted to alleviate its effects on her tenants. Penniless, she emigrated with her husband to Belgium. There she contributed to a number of periodicals, notably Encyclopaedie Des Gens Du Monde.

== USA and death ==
In 1850, her autobiographical novel, Julia Howard, was published. That same year, the Martins sailed for America. She died ten days after arriving in New York City, following giving birth prematurely on board ship. The baby died, too. Her husband returned to England. He arranged for the posthumous publication of her novel, Deed, not Words (1857). In 1883, he was killed in a railway accident.

== Select bibliography ==
- St. Etienne, a romance, 1845.
- Julia Howard. A Romance, London, Richard Bentley, 1850.
- Deeds, not Words; or, the Flemings of Dunaik. A Domestic Tale, London, G. Routledge, 1857.

== See also ==
- The Tribes of Galway
