= James Neal (artist) =

English artist and teacher (1918–2011)

James Neal (18 January 1918 – 12 October 2011) was an English artist and teacher. Born in Islington, North London, Neal was accepted at St Martin's School of Art in 1932, aged 14. During this time he was taught by Leon Underwood, who also taught Henry Moore. James then went to the Royal College of Art in 1936 where he studied for four years under Professor Gilbert Spencer, during this period he won the Spencer prize and met Sir Stanley Spencer.

James Neal served in the Royal Electrical and Mechanical Engineers during the war and was stationed at Hull, Beverley and Spurn Point. His spare time was spent sketching, including many drawings of his comrades.

After the war he worked as a part-time teacher and graphic arts illustrator in London where he met and married Doreen in 1948. In 1958 he moved to Hull as Lecturer in Painting and Drawing at Hull Regional College of Art, then becoming Senior Lecturer in the History of Art. Over the next fifty years he became well known for painting scenes around the Hull area.

Ferens Art Gallery in Hull, has twice mounted major retrospective exhibitions of James Neal's varied and diverse work. In 1985 Beverley Art Gallery held an exhibition called 'Aspects of War in Beverley, 39 - 45' which showed many of James Neal's sketches from his war years in the East Riding of Yorkshire.

He is commemorated with a green plaque on The Avenues, Kingston upon Hull.
