= Truelove (1764) =

18th-century merchant ship

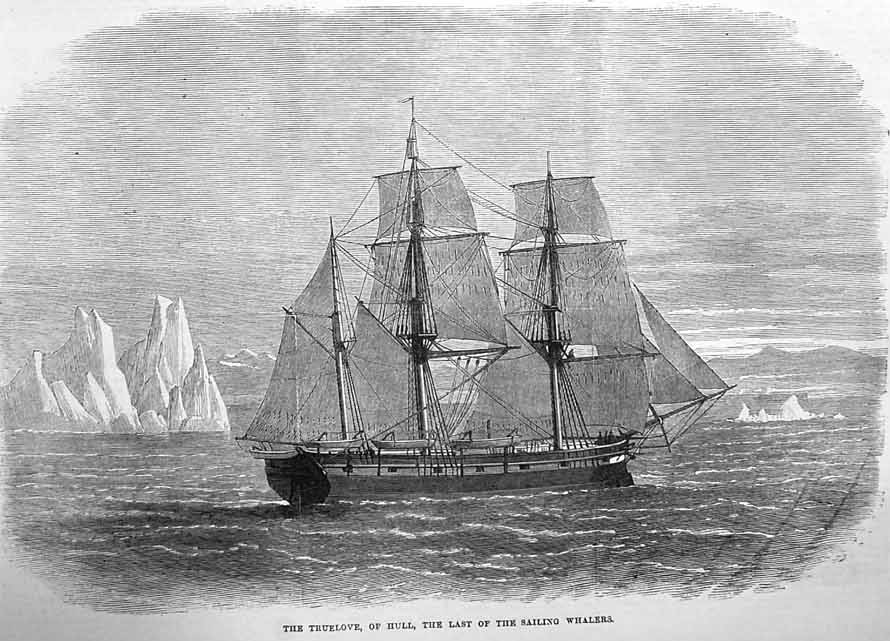
- Truelove in 1870

History

United States
- Name: Truelove
- Launched: 1764
- Fate: Captured by British

Great Britain
- Out of service: Around 1888
- Fate: Broken up

General characteristics
- Displacement: 400 tons
- Tons burthen: 296 register tons
- Length: 100 ft (30 m)
- Beam: 30 ft (9.1 m)
- Draught: 16 ft (4.9 m)
- Sail plan: Full-rigged ship

Truelove was a merchant ship, which served in the 18th and 19th centuries. The vessel was constructed in America in 1764, but was captured by the British in the American War of Independence, and operated as both a whaler and a general cargo ship until 1888, when she was broken up.

== Description ==
Truelove was a full-rigged ship, with three masts and square rig. She was constructed with a "tumble home" design, with her hull sides (topsides) sloping inwards to the upper decks from the water line. Her topsides were constructed with planks overlapping in such a way as to allow water to drain freely from the upper decks. The ship's usual maximum speed was 8 knots (15 km/h). While operating as a merchant ship, she was fitted with twelve guns for defence against French attack. The Truelove is commemorated with a sculpture in Hull by Stefan Gec.

== Service history ==
Flag of the Truelove, presented to Captain Thomas Weatherhill upon the ship's 1873 return to Philadelpia, in the Hull Maritime Museum

Truelove was launched in Philadelphia in 1764. The vessel was captured by the British during the American War of Independence, when she operated as an American privateer, and was bought by a shipowner for use as a cargo ship in the wine trade to Porto. After a refit in 1784, which involved strengthening the vessel's hull, she began work as a whaler in the Arctic, based at Hull, although she was occasionally used for other cargo. In 1849, the ship carried relief supplies in support of Franklin's lost expedition, during which time she was threatened with sinking several times due to pack ice, including one instance when she was trapped for six weeks in Melville Bay.

Notable whaling captains of the Truelove included John Parker, William Barron, and William Wells (1854-1860 & 1866-67). The vessel retired from whaling in 1868, having completed 72 voyages. After this time, she was still capable of being used as a general cargo ship. She was eventually broken up, probably around 1888, after 124 years of near continuous service.
