= Pearson Park =

Park in Kingston upon Hull, East Riding of Yorkshire, England

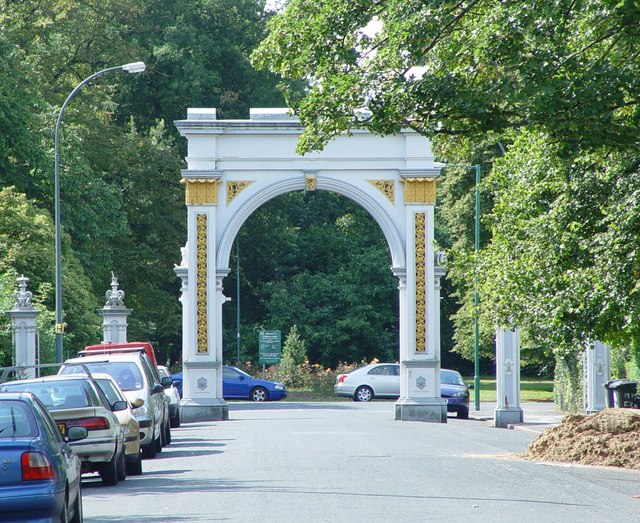
- The entrance to Pearson Park
- Interactive map of Pearson Park
- Type: Municipal
- Location: Kingston upon Hull
- Coordinates: 53°45′31″N 0°21′11″W
- Area: 20 acres (8 ha)
- Created: 1860
- Operator: Hull City Council
- Status: Open all year, 24 hours a day
- Website: No website

Pearson Park, originally known as the People's Park is a park in the west of Kingston upon Hull, England. It is situated about 1 mile (1.5 km) north-west of the city centre of Hull with its main entrance on Beverley Road and its western boundary adjoining Princes Avenue.

The park was established in 1862 through the gift of land by Zachariah Pearson, and was the first public park in the city.

== History ==
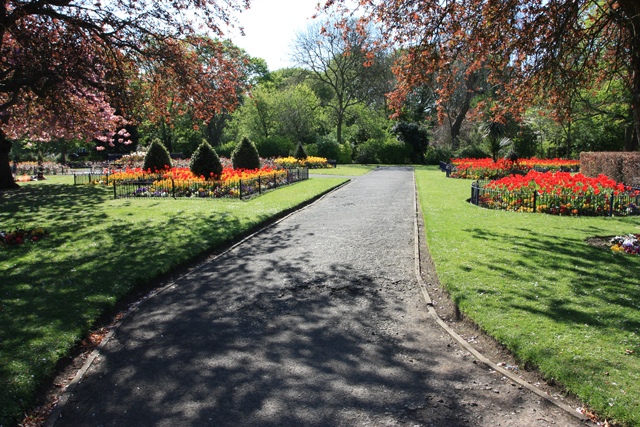
Formal gardens within park (2009)

During the Victorian period the lack of or need for public spaces for working classes to exercise, or otherwise enjoy themselves became a public cause; in 1833 a parliamentary select committee on Public Walks published a paper which promoted the need for open green spaces in cities. (Note: There was also 'Botanic Gardens' (1811), initially private, opened to the public a decade later. Also a 'Zoological Gardens' (1840), both relatively short lived, closing in 1890 and 1862 respectively.) An early proposal in Hull was for a 4.5 mi (7.2 km) walk around the town from Humber bank to Humber bank; this re-appeared as the Grand Victoria Promenade Company in 1845, which proposed a wide road and tree lined walk; the scheme did not go ahead, and the Victoria Dock Branch Line (c. 1853) was built along a similar route. In the late 1850s an attempt was made to gain the rights to the use of the land of the former Hull Citadel for use as a public space, leading to an unsuccessful suit in the Court of Chancery in 1861 made by the Corporation of Hull against the Government.

In 1860 the then Mayor, Zachariah Pearson, donated a 27-acre (11 ha) plot to the board of health on the proviso it would be developed as a park. He retained 10 acres (4 ha) on three sides of the park, and constructed a road to the land. At this time the land lay outside the urban growth of the town, close to the hamlet of Stepney.

On 28 August 1860 the park was inaugurated. The event was organised by Enderby Jackson; a procession starting at Mansion House to the park took place, the whole train over 2 miles long. (Note: The spade for the tree planting ceremony led the procession, followed by the park committee and other officials with the deeds of the park, followed by Hull's volunteer force (around 1600), the Lord Mayor's carriage and the Sheriff's carriage, as well as other officials including the dock directors, the Lord Mayor of York and other Lord Mayors, members of the Corporation and of the Trinity Hose, foreign consuls, and representatives of various guilds and organisations, actors, musical bands, and so on.) According to Sheahan (1864) around 30,000 visitors came to Hull by railway to observe the proceedings. A ceremony involving the deed of conveyance took place, and the Mayor, Zachariah Pearson then planted a tree, a Wellingtonia Gigantea. Celebrations were continued at the Station Hotel, with a dinner and fireworks display, and to the next day, with further ceremonial tree planting.

At the opening ceremony Pearson noted the intention of providing open spaces for the good health of the working population, also noting that the aim of constructing high status houses around the park was to keep the wealthy citizens of Hull living within Hull.

The original park design was by J. C. Niven; in 1864 the park included a cricket ground, a folly The Ruins, statues of Queen Victoria and of Ceres, the goddess, as well as a lake. Other areas were set aside for a bowling green, archery, and gymnastics. In addition a road had been built around the park, along which high quality 'villa' residences were under construction. The main entrance, from Beverley Road, 50 by 29 1/2 ft (15.2 by 9.0 m) wide by high, was an ornamental gateway by Young and Pool, (Note: The entrance was decorated with various symbolic insignia and emblems: including emblems of the Corporation, the Trinity House, and the Pearson's own crest. It may have been inspired by the gateway to Syon House. Its gates were removed 1901.) iron gates by Thompson and Stather of Hull formed the Princes Avenue entrance. The east entrance lodge, c. 1870 (1861?) is now listed.

Other early features surviving included a cast iron drinking fountain (1861), (Note: Restored in 2008 with plans proposed for further restoration work in 2016.) and statues of Queen Victoria (installed 1861) and Prince Albert (installed 1868), both by Thomas Earle.

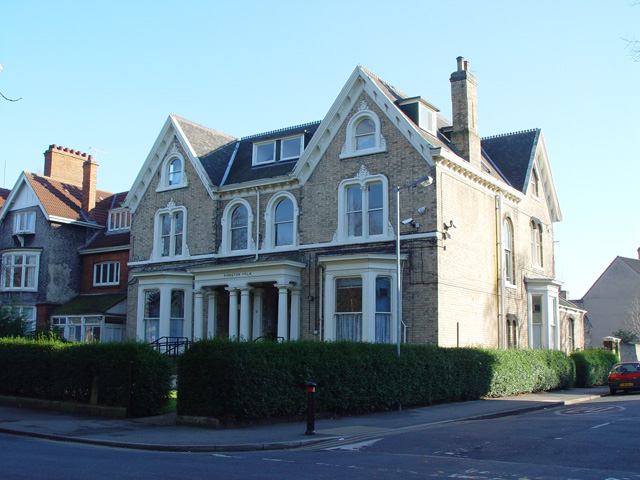
Typical large Pearson Park house (2008)

Housing development on the surrounding road took place throughout the latter part of the 19th century; by 1890 much the road had been developed, all substantial houses; F. W. Hagen was architect for many of them, numbers 43, 50 and 54, all from the early 1860s are listed buildings.

During the construction of the Hull and Barnsley Railway in the 1880s, the navies were housed in huts built in the park.

A memorial to Pearson was added in 1897, as a marble relief, fixed to an ironstone monolith. (Note: The monolith was gift of Bolckow Vaughan & Co. and is made of ironstone from the Cleveland district of North Yorkshire.)

A bandstand was installed in 1908. In 1912 a cupola rescued from Cuthbert Brodrick's Hull town hall was installed in the park. In around 1930 a Victorian style conservatory was built near the lake.

During the Second World War the park housed nissen huts and air raid shelters, which were removed in 1954; part of the park's serpentine path system was lost during these modifications. An iron bridge across the lake, and the bandstand were also removed after the Second World War.

Late 20th century modifications include installation of fountains in the lake, construction of a children's playground on the west edge of the park (replacing tennis courts, and originally a bowling green). The 150th anniversary of the park opening was celebrated on 29 August 2010, as part of the celebrations another Wellingtonia gigantea tree was planted.

In summer 2017 £3 million was awarded by the Heritage Lottery Fund for restoration work on the park. Work got underway in December 2018 with the dismantling of the entrance archway. Restoration of the archway took a year and was officially reopened on 19 December 2019.

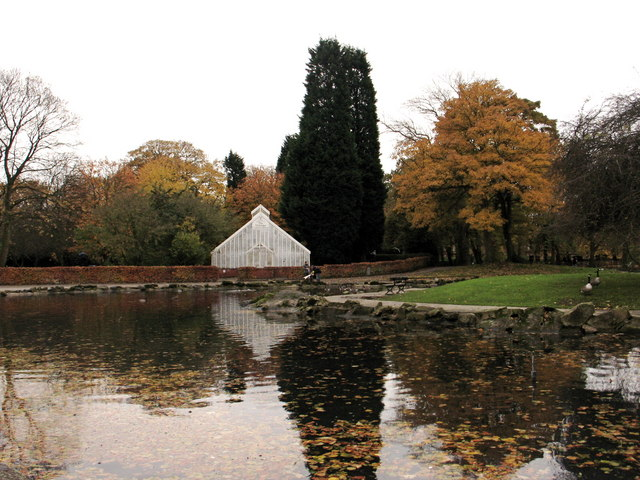
Lake and 1930s Victorian style conservatory (2008)

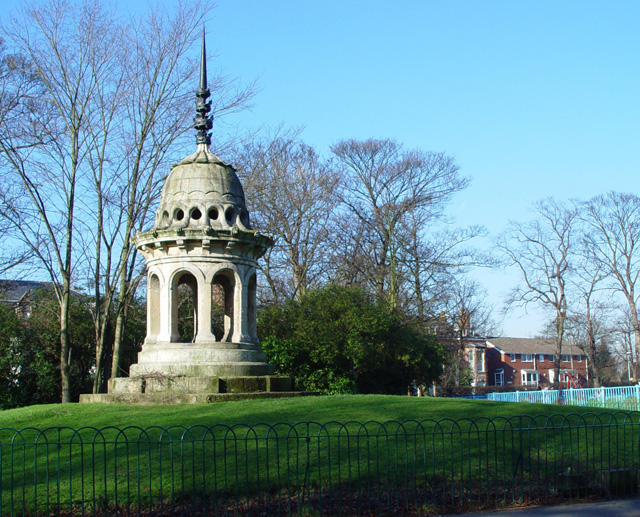
Cupola from Cuthbert Brodrick's Town Hall (2008)

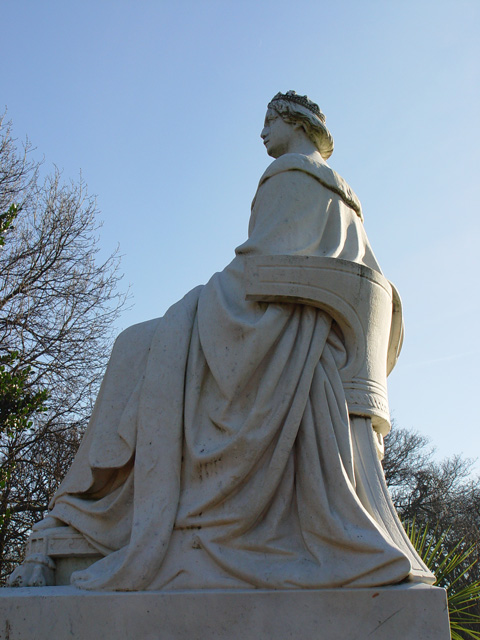
Thomas Earle's 1861 statue of Queen Victoria (2008)

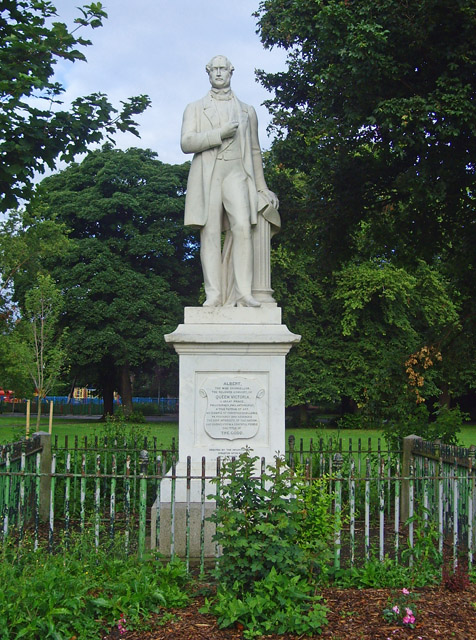
Earle's 1868 statue of Prince Albert (2008)

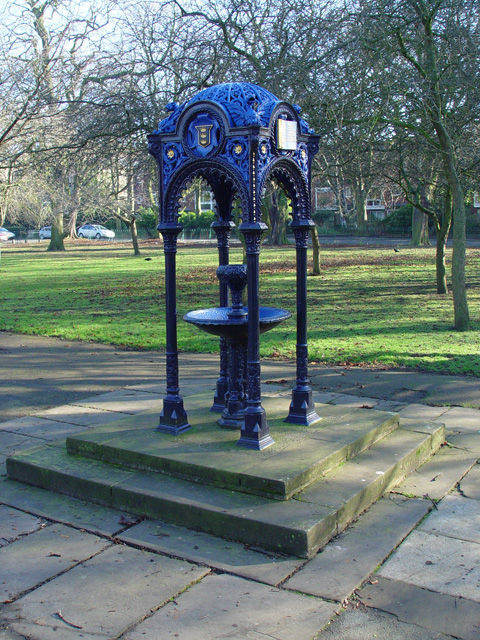
Restored 1861 fountain (2008)

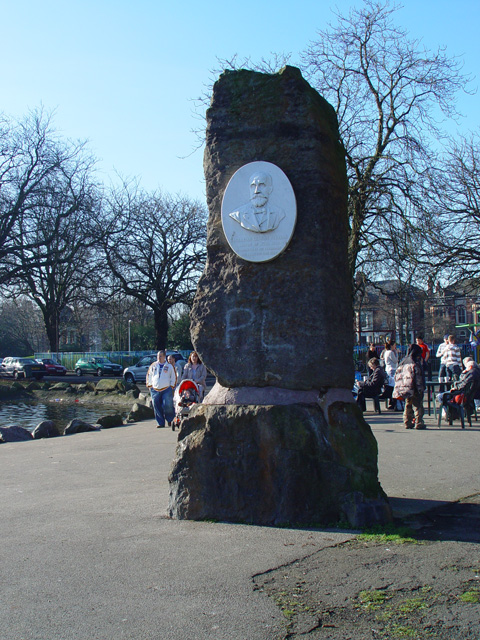
Pearson monument on Cleveland ironstone column (2008)

== See also ==
- High Windows, poem by poet Philip Larkin, based on the view from No.32 Pearson Park, his home for 18 years from 1956.
- Listed buildings in Kingston upon Hull (Avenue Ward)
