= John Alderson (physician) =

English physician

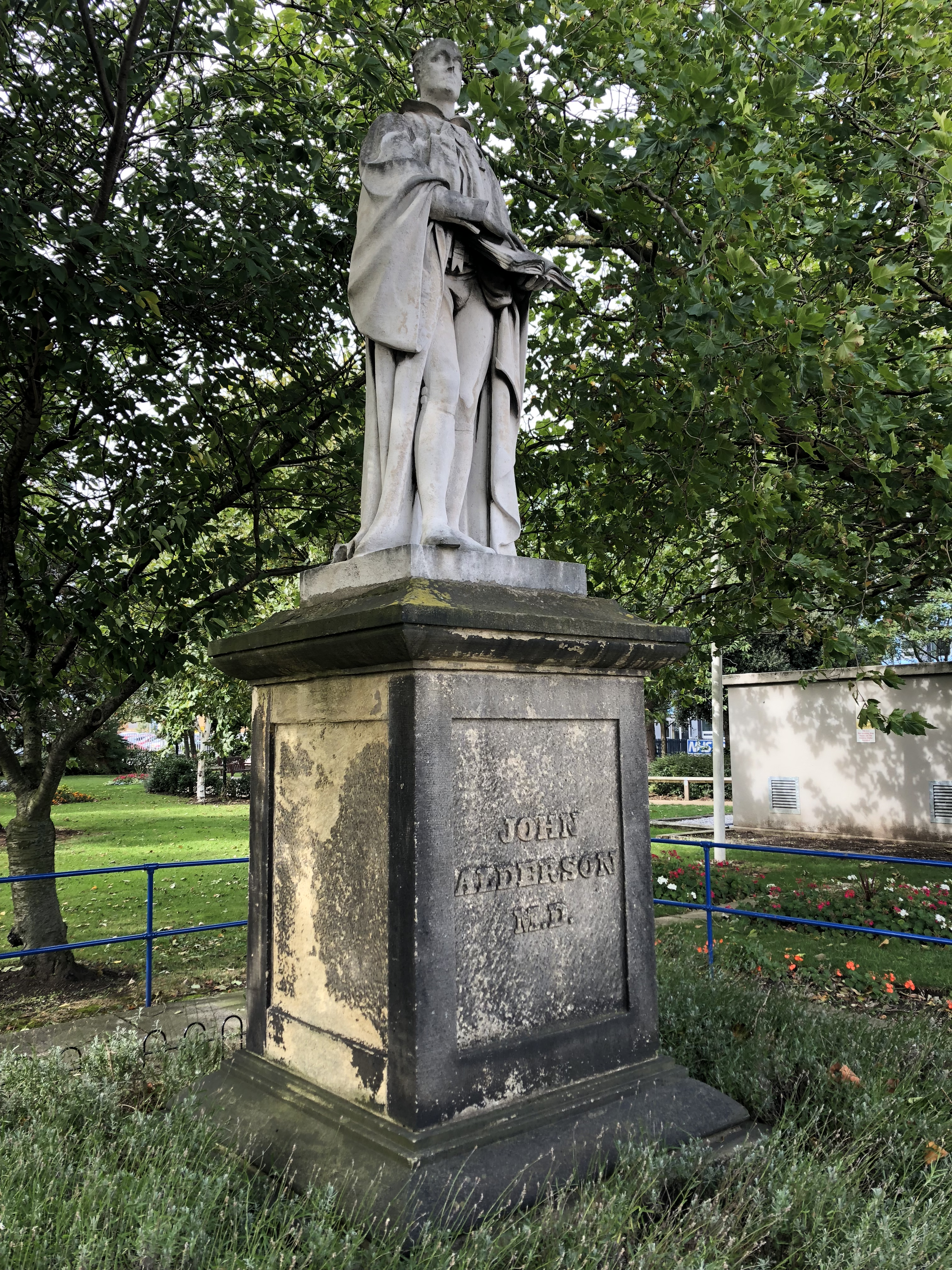
Statue of John Alderson located at Hull Royal Infirmary

John Alderson MD (1758 – 16 September 1829) was an English physician.

== Life ==
He was born at Lowestoft, the son of a dissenting minister, the Rev. J. Alderson, whose death (1760) was hastened by the adverse termination of a lawsuit. Elisha Barlow, a merchant of Lowestoft, deploring the narrow means of his minister, who had a numerous family, bequeathed a good estate at Mutford for the augmentation of the stipend, on the condition that, whenever Alderson should withdraw from the church, the estate was to devolve on him and his heirs for ever. Thereupon the whole body of dissenters in the town, out of regard for their pastor, drew up an instrument by which they expelled him from the church in order that he might acquire the estate. They afterwards re-elected him to the pastoral office.

Their good intentions were however defeated by the heirs-at-law, who disputed the legality of the bequest in the court of Chancery on the statute of mortmain, and gained their suit. Alderson was shortly after taken ill while preaching, and died on reaching his home.

== Works ==
He published at Hull An Essay on the Nature and Origin of the Contagion of Fever (1788) and An Essay on the Rhus Toxicodendron, or Sumach, and its Efficacy in Paralysis (1782) which passed through three editions between 1794 and 1805. In 1795 he was elected physician to the Hull Infirmary. To commemorate his services there and the public spirit he exhibited in founding and presiding over various literary and scientific institutions in the town, a statue of the doctor was erected in 1833 by subscription and placed on the lawn in front of the infirmary at a cost of £300. The statue is by local sculptor Thomas Earle.

Dr. Alderson was also the author of a work not altogether of a professional character, entitled ‘An Essay on Apparitions accounted for independently of Preternatural Agency’ (8vo, London, 1823). This work gave extremely curious cases of mental illusion which came under his own immediate observation. He published two editions of a treatise ‘On the Improvement of Poor Soils’ (1802 and 1807) and several editions of "Orthographical Exercise".

== Family ==
His son James, after receiving a regular medical training, began to practise in Hull, and soon became the chief physician of the town.

== Publications ==
- An Essay on the Rhus Toxicodendron, or Sumach, and its Efficacy in Paralysis (1782)
- An Essay on the Nature and Origin of the Contagion of Fever (1788)
- An Essay on Apparitions (1823)
