= William Wells (whaling master) =

- Born: 15 July 1815; Towthorpe
- Died: 27 April 1880 (aged 64); Kingston upon Hull
- Burial place: St Marys Church, Rimswell
- Occupation: Sea captain
- Spouse(s): Jane Hornby
- Children: 7

William Wells (1815–1880) was an English whaling master (1844 to 1867), harbour master of Hull, and advisor to explorer Benjamin Leigh Smith.

== Career as a mariner ==
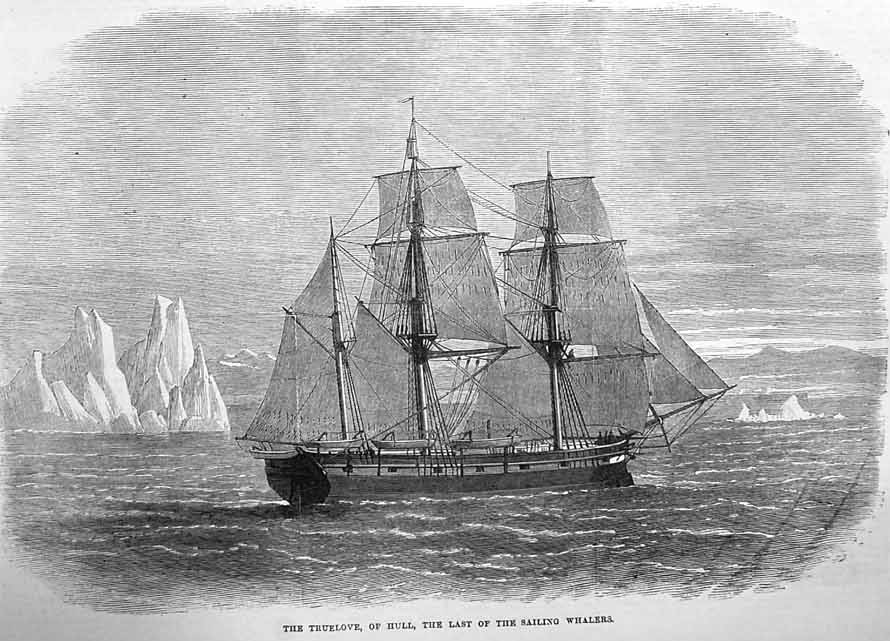
Illustration of the Truelove from The Illustrated London News 1870

William started his career as an apprentice at the age of 12 in 1827, aboard the Abram. He completed his apprenticeship in 1835 and worked as a seaman in merchant ships and whalers until 1842. On 15 February 1852, he was admitted as a younger brother of the guild of masters and pilots of Trinity House. In December 1867, after 26 years as a whaling master, William became harbour master at Hull and advisor to explorer Benjamin Leigh Smith. He retired in 1876.

=== Commands ===
Wells' first command was for the merchant ship Ann in 1842; he went on to captain many whaling ships: Helen (1844–45), St George (1846–49), Ann (1850–1853), Truelove (1854–1860 and 1866–1867), Emma (1861–62), Diana (1863), and Narwhal (1864). He was one of the last two whaling masters sailing from Hull.

== See also ==
- Hull Maritime Museum
