= Hull General Cemetery =

Cemetery in Kingston upon Hull, East Riding of Yorkshire, England

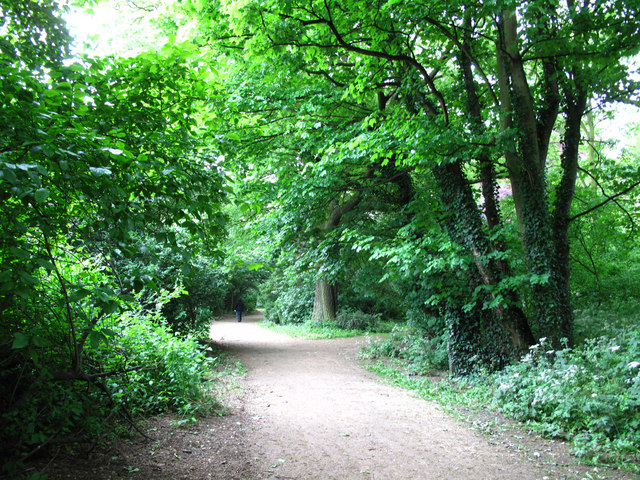
Hull General Cemetery (disused, 2009)

Hull General Cemetery was established by a private company in 1847 on Spring Bank (now Spring Bank West) in the west of Kingston upon Hull, East Riding of Yorkshire, England. In 1862 the Hull Corporation established a cemetery adjacent, now known as Western Cemetery, and in c. 1890 expanded the cemetery west across Chanterlands Avenue onto an adjacent site.

The General Cemetery contains several notable monument and burials, including a monument to a cholera outbreak in 1849, as well as the graves of many notable persons of the Victoria era and early 20th century of Kingston upon Hull. The General Cemetery closed in 1972, the Western Cemetery is, as of 2018, still in use.

In 2018, a community group of volunteers, The Friends of Hull General Cemetery, was formed and have taken on the challenge of caring for this heritage site of special natural interest. The group was formed as a subcommittee of the Hull Civic Society. It meets regularly at the Avenues Centre, Park Avenue, Hull. During its short life it has generated a significant amount of interest in the cemetery from the general public and plans are afoot to bid for local and national funding to make the cemetery a more hospitable place for the community to visit yet still retain its historical significance and environmental importance for future generations.

In September 2018 a short introduction to the Hull General Cemetery 1847–1972, was published by Pete Lowden and Bill Longbone

== History ==
=== Hull General Cemetery ===
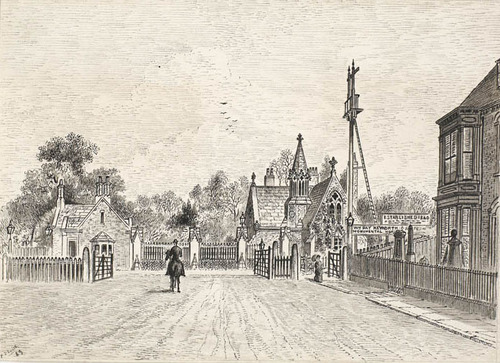
Main cemetery entrance and railway level crossing, view from Spring Bank (c. 1889, F. S. Smith)

Hull General Cemetery Company was established in 1846, (Note: 53.751918°N 0.363632°W, General Cemetery) with a capital of 1,000 shares of £10. The cemetery on Spring Bank was opened in 1847, for Anglican burials only, with the foundation stone of the cemetery's entrance lodge formally laid by the mayor, B. M. Jalland on 2 June. (Note: The lodge was designed by Cuthbert Brodrick.) The ground was consecrated on 28 August 1847. In 1859 the foundation stone for the cemetery's chapel was laid, by the mayor, Martin Samuelson. (Note: 53.752524°N 0.363045°W, General Cemetery mortuary chapel (site of)) The cemetery entrance was in a Gothic Revival style, (Note: 53.751813°N 0.361377°W, General Cemetery original gate entrance (site of)) consisting of three lodges and six large double gates; (Note: The entrance gave the name to the nearby Hull Cemetery Gates railway station (originally 'Hull Cemetery station') on the Victoria Dock Branch Line. After 1881 the station was known as Hull Botanic Gardens.) the original mortuary chapel was octagonal, a second chapel was later added exclusively for Anglican rites, and a third in 1863 for the use of non-conformists. (Note: Later chapels were added in the "Western Cemetery". Sheahan 1864 makes no distinction between the two, referring to both as "Hull Cemetery". See Ordnance Survey maps from 1850 to 1900.) At the time of its development the cemetery was in the parish of Cottingham, and on the outer fringes of the urban development of Hull.

Hull General Cemetery Company Act 1854
- Act of Parliament
- Parliament of the United Kingdom
- Long title: An Act to incorporate the Hull General Cemetery Company, and to enlarge and improve their cemetery, and for other purposes.
- Citation: 17 & 18 Vict. c. c

Dates
- Royal assent: 3 July 1854

The Hull General Cemetery Company Act 1854 (17 & 18 Vict. c. c) allowed incorporation of the company, and allowed it to expand. (Note: 17 & 18 Vict. c. c (3 July 1854) An Act to incorporate the Hull General Cemetery Company, and to enlarge and improve their cemetery, and for other purposes.) Intramural burial were abolished in Hull after 1856/7. In 1855 Quakers took a 999-year lease on a plot of ground within the cemetery. (Note: 53.751581°N 0.368344°W, Quaker burial ground) Several prominent Quakers were later buried in the ground including persons from the prominent local employers of the Reckitt, and Priestmann families. By 1864 the cemetery occupied around 20 acres (8.1 ha), and contained over 10,000 interments.

The main gates were demolished in the early 20th century, and built over. The Hull General Cemetery went into receivership in the 1970s, and maintenance of the cemetery was taken over by Hull City Council. The final interment was in 1972, excluding the Quaker burial ground which had its last burial in 1974. The overgrown cemetery was cleared after being taken over by the council in 1972. The main gates, and all the chapels had been demolished by 1983.

The Hull General Cemetery Company sought liquidation via the courts which it achieved in 1972 leaving the site without ownership. Eventually, after questions asked in Parliament the site was sold to Hull City Council for a nominal sum of £1 in 1974.

Public opposition to a plan for renovating Hull General Cemetery, backed by notable persons such as Philip Larkin and John Betjeman, was overruled. The whole process took about 18 months. Due to Hull General Cemetery's conspicuous role in Victorian Hull, a number of headstones, principally of more notable members of the public, were allowed to remain.

=== Conclusion ===
The Friends of Hull General Cemetery are working to create a community space in the heart of the city. The Friends of Hull General Cemetery Facebook group was formed to promote the historical and environmental attributes of the cemetery. It is the ‘Friends’ intention to turn the long-overgrown and disused burial ground into a place which can be enjoyed by all in the local neighborhood. The 'Friends' hope to achieve this over time by clearing up the graves and headstones, by encouraging the diversity of flora and wildlife, by promoting historical research, and most importantly of all by getting and keeping local people and organizations involved in its upkeep.

==== Notable graves and monuments ====
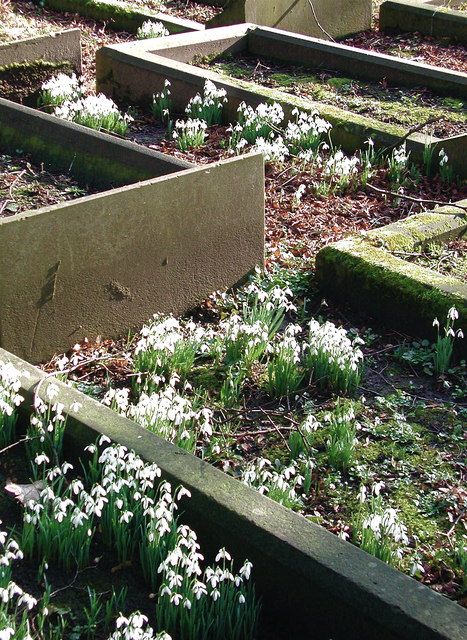
Plain graves in the Quaker burial section of the General Cemetery (2008)

- Monument to the victims of the 1849 cholera epidemic, erected through private contributions. Around 700 victims were buried in the cemetery.
- William Clowes, d. 1851, Methodist.
- Joseph Beaumont, d. 1855, Wesleyan preacher.
- Count de Werdinsky, d. 1856, supposed displaced Polish nobleman, probable serial fraudster and criminal.
- Cast Iron monument in the style of an Eleanor Cross (listed structure, c. 1860s).
- Isaac Reckitt, d. 1862, Quaker, founder of Reckitt and Sons.
- Henry Blundell, d. 1865, founder of the paint company Blundell Spence and Company.
- Monument to John Gravill, d. c. 1866, captain of the ill-fated whaling ship Diana.
- Thomas Wilson, d. 1869, shipping magnate.
- Thomas Earle, d. 1873, sculptor.
- Henry Redmore, d. 1887, artist.
- Monument to John Rylands (d. 1888). (buried in Southern Cemetery, Manchester.)
- James Reckitt, d. 1922, Quaker, philanthropist, also of Reckitt and Sons.
- William Dent Priestman, d. 1936, Quaker, oil engineer pioneer, founder of Priestman Brothers
- Family and wife of Albert Kaye Rollit, mayor of Hull, politician and lawyer.
- 28 Commonwealth service personnel of both World Wars are recorded by the Commonwealth War Graves Commission as buried in Hull General Cemetery but as their graves cannot be maintained, their names are listed on a special memorial in Hull Northern Cemetery.

=== Hull Western Cemetery ===
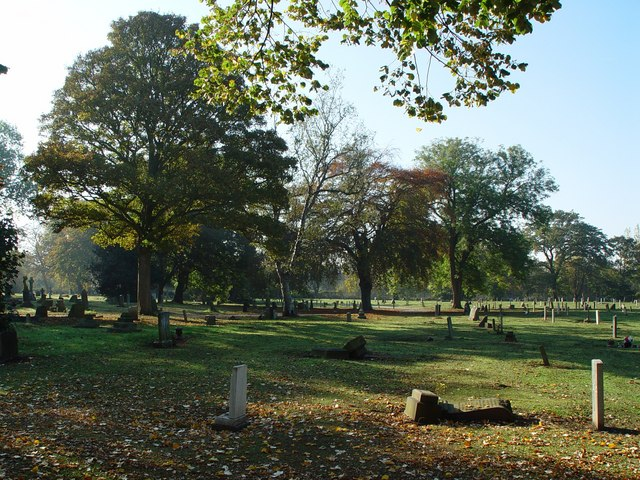
Far western end of Western Cemetery (2007)

5 acres (2.0 ha) of land had been set aside by the Hull General Cemetery for use of the board of health (1859), and in 1862 the board acquired the land, opening a new cemetery adjacent west of the old General Cemetery, known as the Western Cemetery. (Note: 53.751718°N 0.370872°W, Western Cemetery) A chapel was later added for Anglican rites, (Note: 53.751454°N 0.374867°W, Western Cemetery, 1890s addition, Mortuary chapel (site of)) and a third in 1863 for the use of non-conformists. (Note: 53.751482°N 0.371570°W, Mortuary chapel, non conformist (site of)) By 1892 the Western Cemetery occupied 27.5 acres (11.1 ha).

In c. 1889 the cemetery was expanded westwards, with additional land on the opposite side of Chanterlands Avenue, (Note: 53.751761°N 0.376344°W, Western Cemetery, 1890s addition) a further mortuary chapel was built in the extension. (Note: 53.751556°N 0.369853°W, Mortuary chapel, C of E (site of)) As of 1995 all the cemetery's chapels had been demolished.

As of 2018 the Western Cemetery is in still use.

==== Notable graves and monuments ====
- A monument to those killed in the R38 Airship disaster over the Humber Estuary.
- Memorials to Captain George Henry Smith, and to William Richard Leggert, both killed in the Dogger Bank incident.
- John Cunningham, Victoria Cross recipient, 1916
- The cemetery contains the war graves of 496 identified Commonwealth service personnel from both World Wars.

== See also ==
- Listed buildings in Kingston upon Hull (Avenue Ward)

== Gallery ==
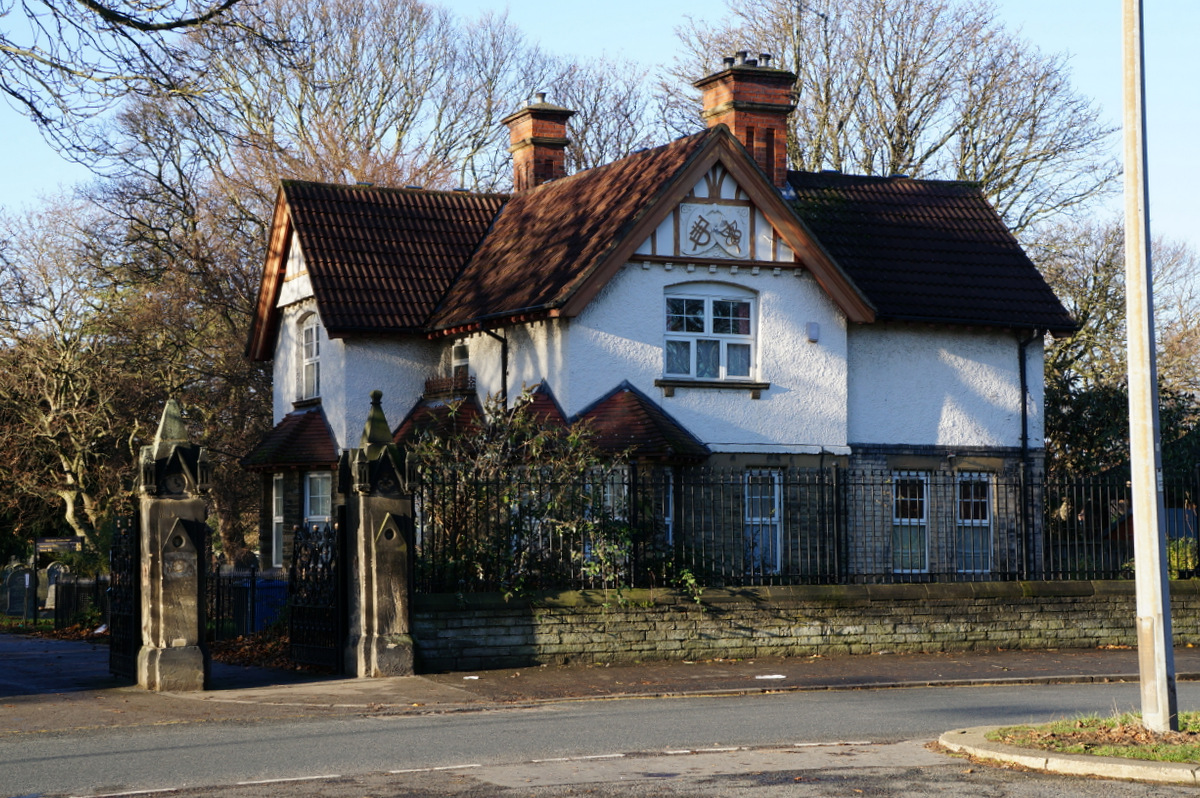
Gatehouse, Western Cemetery extension (2013)

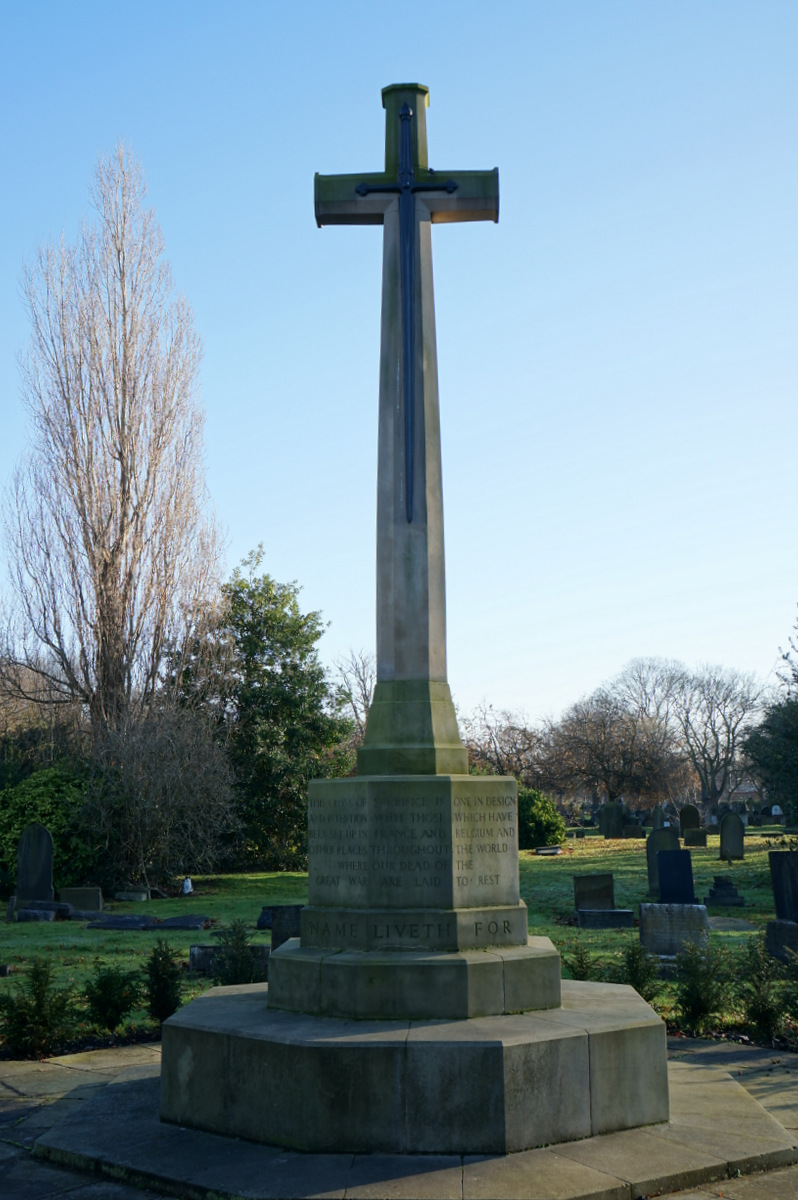
First World War Cross of Sacrifice memorial, Western Cemetery (2013)

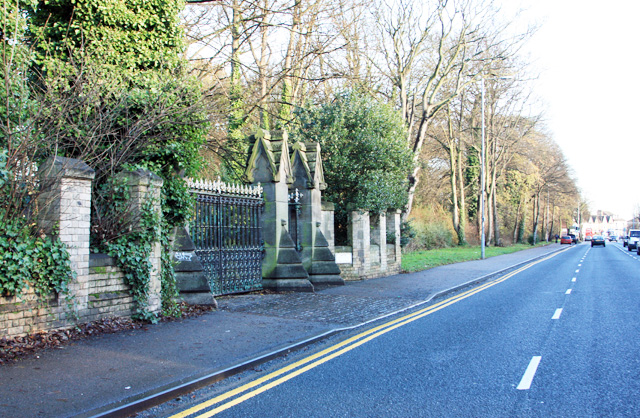
Spring Bank entrance gates, General Cemetery (2012)

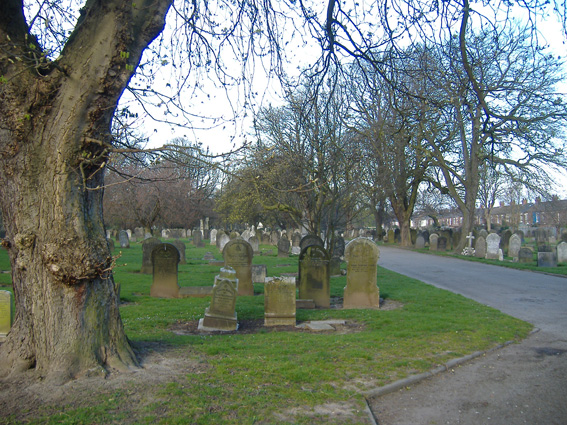
Eastern part of the Western Cemetery (2007)

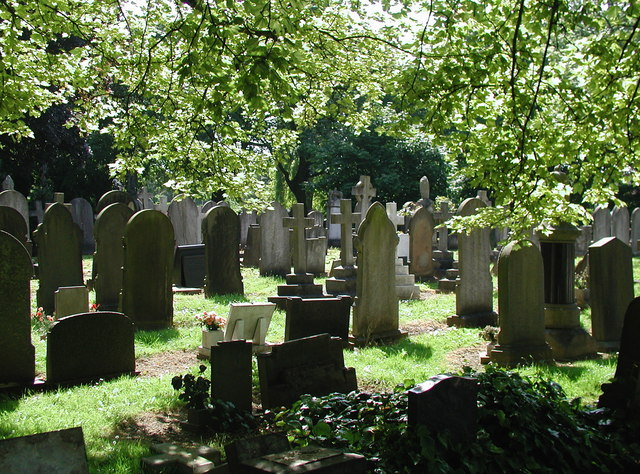
Graves in the western part of the cemetery (2007)

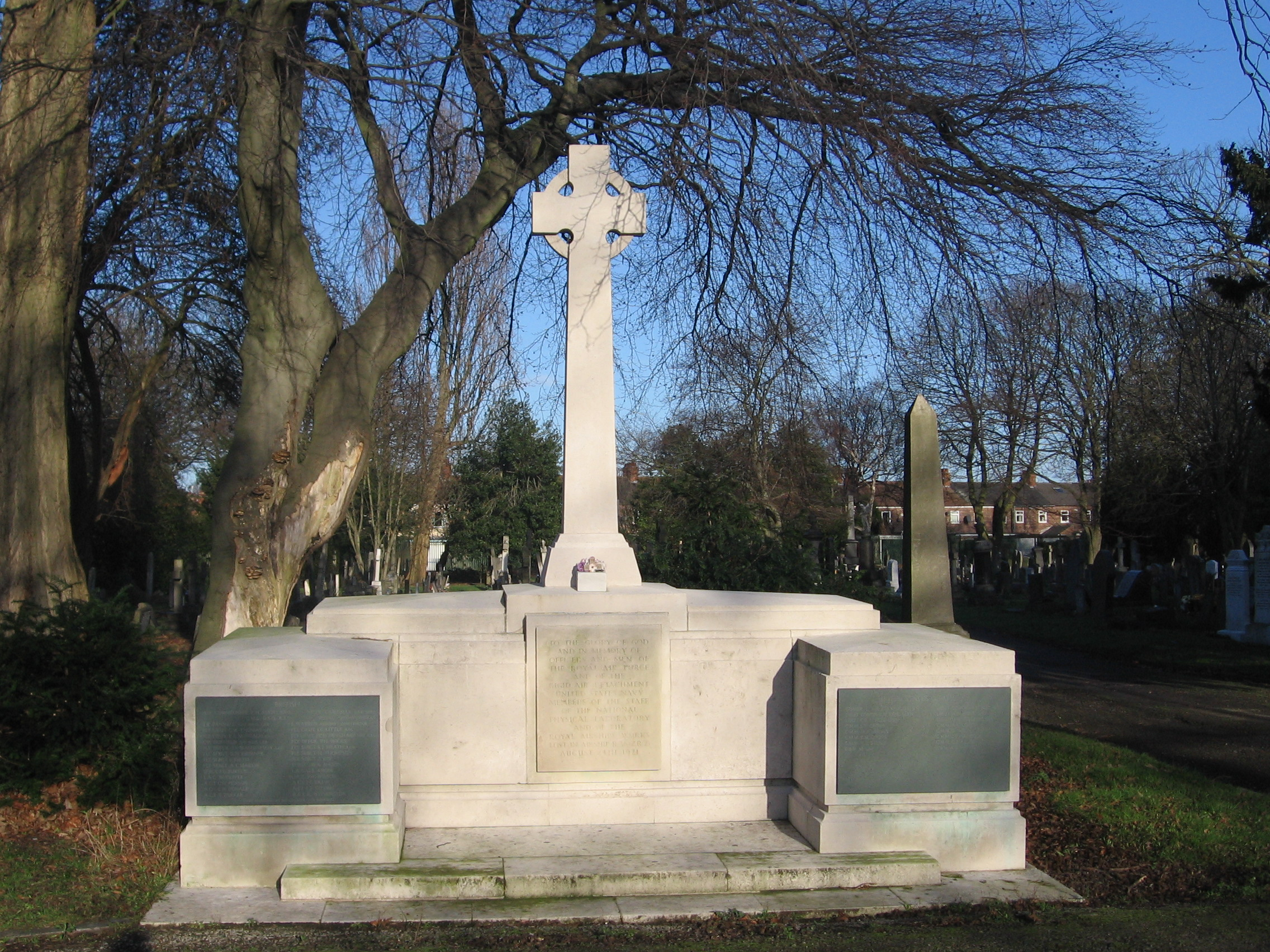
R38 memorial, Western Cemetery
