= The Avenues, Kingston upon Hull =

Area of Kingston upon Hull, East Riding of Yorkshire, England

Coordinates: 53.758643°N 0.365813°W

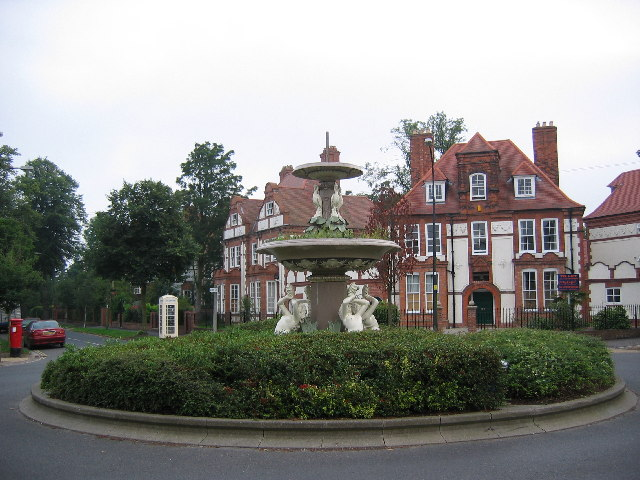
Park Avenue / Salisbury Street fountain

The Avenues is an area of high status Victorian housing located in the north-west of Kingston upon Hull, England. It is formed by four main tree-lined straight avenues running west off the north-north-east/south-south-west running Princes Avenue.

The Avenues area, originally built as middle class housing in the late 19th century, has remained a popular residential area; its popularity with left wing intellectuals and academics, and varied leafy cosmopolitan ambience has caused it to be stereotyped as Hull's 'Muesli Belt'. To the adjoining south of the Avenues is an area of roughly contemporary Victorian terraces, with streets named after the seats of nobles; it is sometimes referred to as the Dukeries.

Whilst primarily housing, the area hosted the Industrial School for Girls from 1888 to 1919 on Park Avenue, the building afterwards used for other educational purposes, now known as the Avenues Centre. Marlborough Avenue is the location of Froebel House Preparatory School.

Princes Avenue was a popular urban shopping street during the 20th century. In the 21st century it has remained commercial with increasing numbers of specialist shops, restaurants and other food outlets.

== History ==
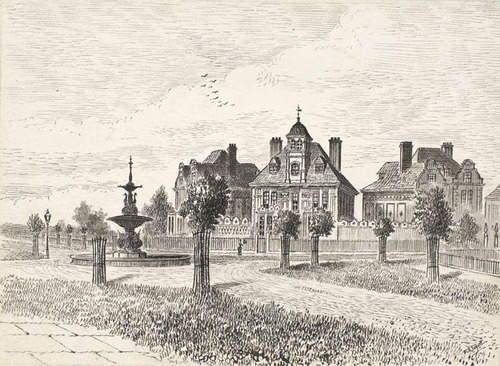
Westbourne Avenue, under development, c. 1886 (F. S. Smith)

The Avenues were constructed on a green field site known as Newland Tofts from the latter part of the 19th century onwards. (Note: The name Newlands arose from the land reclamation in the 12th century which formed 'new lands'. Tofts is from the Norse meaning the site of houses.) The boundaries were formed by: Newland Tofts Lane (Princes Avenue), and the parallel Derringham Dike to the east; Setting Dyke to the north; Spring Bank and Spring and Derringham Dikes to the south; and to the west a field boundary between Newland Tofts and Ewe lands and Chanter Lands which eventually became Chanterlands Avenue. To the south the area was limited by the new (1847) General Cemetery built on the northern side of Derringham Bank (Spring Bank West).

The estate was formally opened in 1875 by the developer David Parkinson Garbutt; (Note: David Parkinson Garbutt, of Malborough House, Anlaby Road; married Mary Ann, daughter of successful fish trader, originally of Yarmouth. Garbutt's business interests included shipbuilding (business liquidated c. 1883), shipowning, and building development – he also developed an estate in Romford, Essex, and the Newington Waterworks, Hull. A Wesleyan, and promoter of the temperance movement. Died 15 November 1915, aged 70.) it was built on the outskirts of Hull with recently opened facilities nearby: Pearson Park (opened 1860) on the east side of Princes Avenue, and Botanic Gardens railway station (up to 1881 known as Cemetery Gates) at the southern end of Princes Avenue. The site was laid out on a generous scale for the middle and prosperous classes; the largest street; Westbourne Avenue was 59 feet (18 m) wide.

Early developments included houses by George Gilbert Scott the Younger, built 1877–79, which are now listed buildings, number 78 Park Avenue, then known as Ivy Villa, 99 to 109 Princes Avenue and 42 to 48 Westbourne Avenue. (Note: No. 109, Park Avenue was also a listed structure, de-listed in 2003.) The area was primarily residential, in 1888 the Hull School board opened the 'Industrial School for Girls', a residential corrective institution on Park Avenue. (Note: From 1920 used as a school for physically handicapped children; later an arts and craft college; used for civil defence during the Second World War; later used for teacher training. After 1986 the building was used as an adult education centre.) A small preparatory school Froebel House was established in 1906 on Marlborough Avenue; (Note: Inspired by the Froebel Institute in London (see Friedrich Fröbel); where one of the founders, Lydia Musgrave, had been trained, as of 2013 the school is still in existence.) in the same year St Cuthbert's Church was constructed on Marlborough Avenue. (Note: Destroyed during the Second World War a replacement was built in 1956.)

In October 1900 electric trams began to travel on Princes Avenue on a route that linked to the city centre by Spring Bank.

The area to the south of the Avenues, and north of Hull General Cemetery was developed between 1897 and 1910; terraces of un-gardened houses were built on east-west rows of streets named after ducal seats: Welbeck Street (Welbeck Abbey), Newstead Street (Newstead Abbey), Thoresby Street (Thoresby Hall), Belvoir Street (Belvoir Castle) and Blenheim Street (Blenheim Palace); as a consequence the area became known as the "Dukeries". (see also The Dukeries, Nottinghamshire). The Dukeries were deveolped from east to west, and mostly completed within 10 years, withe the exception of Wharncliffe Street built c.1914.

By 1910, the entire estate was mostly developed with few vacant plots remaining, the land to the north (Newland Avenue), and to the south (the Dukeries) had also been developed as housing, by the 1920s the land to the west had been urbanised with the construction of Chanterlands Avenue, and associated terraced housing. (Note: Chanterlands Avenue did not exist in 1875; it grew northward from Spring Bank West from the first decade of the 20th century onwards, connecting with the western edge of the Avenues by 1908.)

Both sides of Princes Avenue were developed by 1910, with notable structures including the Elim Pentecostal church (1897–99), which until 1982 was a Congregationalist church known as Fish Street Memorial Church, and a Methodist church (1905, architect Alfred Gelder); by 1910 Princes Avenue was fully developed as a shopping street, with multiple competing premises in all the major realms of commerce – grocers, fishmongers, butchers, hardware, confectioners etc.

Much of the Avenues area was developed piecemeal in small plots; many of the British housing styles used in the late 19th and early 20th century are found in the area, including revived Queen Anne style (in the Gilbert Scott Jr. houses), mock Tudor, arts and crafts, and a variety of vernacular styles.

As part of the original layout of the development Westbourne, Marlborough and Victoria Avenue had cast iron decorative fountains in the centre of the roads, with two more on Princes Avenue. All were of similar circular tiered design. The fountains on Princes Avenue were removed in 1926 due to increased traffic. The remaining fountains on Westbourne and Park Avenue are now listed structures. (Note: In 1996 the Park Avenue fountain was damaged in a car accident and replaced with a replica.) A replica of the Victoria Avenue Fountain, removed after an accident in the 1920s, was unveiled on 8 July 2023 and is the only functioning fountain on The Avenues.

The tram system on Princes Avenue was replaced with a trolleybus service in 1937; the trolley buses were replaced in turn by motor buses in the 1960s. The Botanic Gardens railway station closed in the 1960s with the closure of the Victoria Dock Branch Line.

Small scale infill development created Parkside Close (1960s) on undeveloped land between Victoria and Park Avenue, and Muirfield Park (1970s) on a former recreation ground. The area became a council Conservation Area in 1974. In the 1980s the area experienced problems with subsidence due to a drought and extensive tree planting in the area causing drying of the clay subsoil and as a result many trees were cut down. Many of the tree stumps were carved into sculptures by local artists.

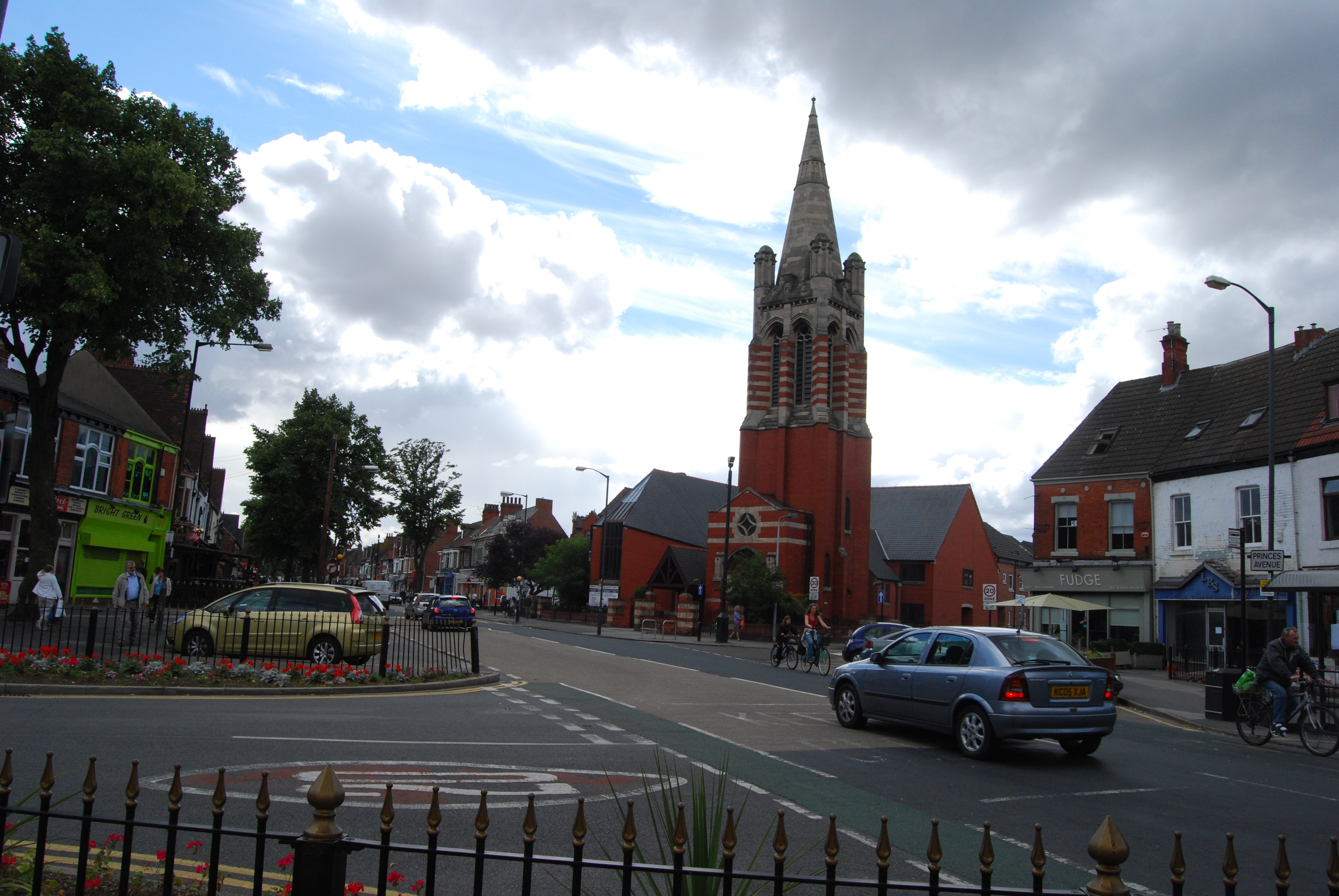
Princes Avenue

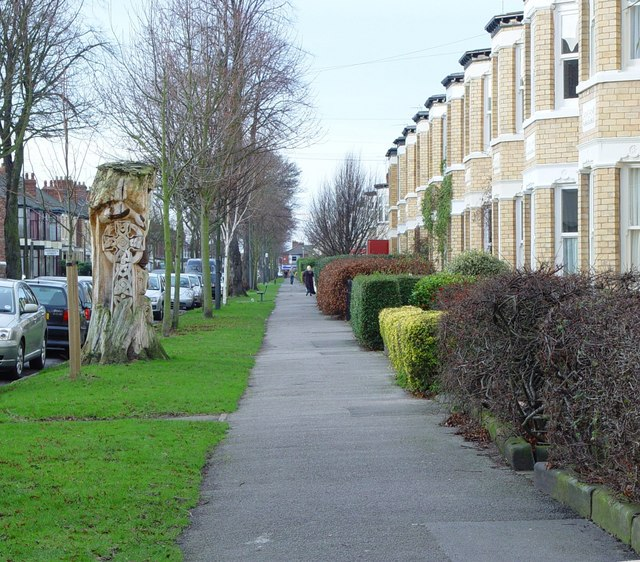
Marlborough Avenue, carved tree stump

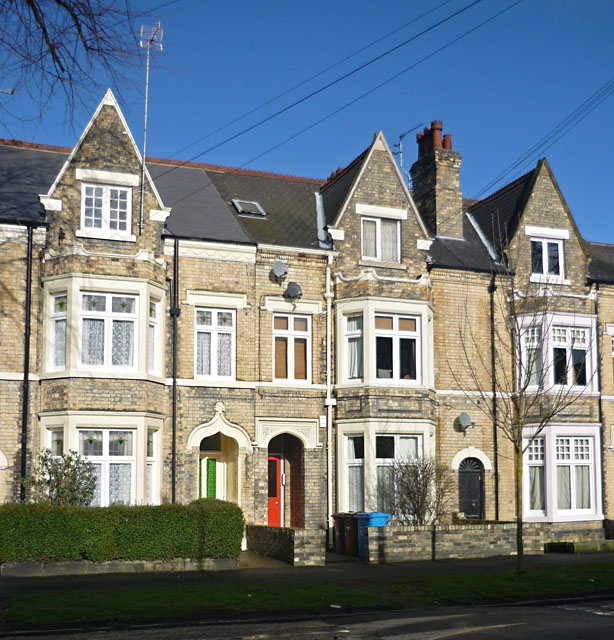
Marlborough Avenue, typical houses

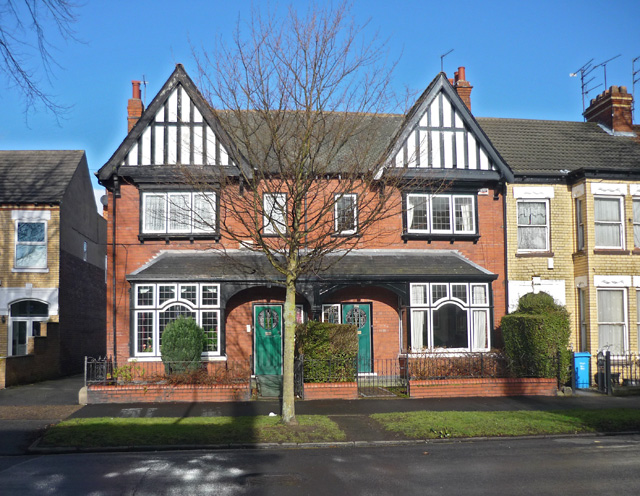
Marlborough Avenue, typical houses

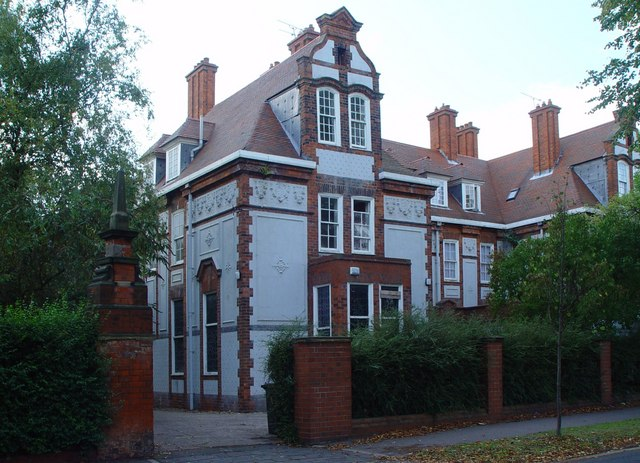
Salisbury Street house (George Gilbert Scott Jnr.)

== Commemorative plaques ==
Plaque on Marlborough Avenue at birthplace of Kay Mander

The Avenues and Pearson Park Residents Association operate a series of Green Plaques in the area to mark where famous residents lived. The first and second plaques were erected in honour of the actor Ian Carmichael and crime writer and poet Dorothy L. Sayers, respectively.

Others celebrated in the area by other plaque schemes include female pilot Amy Johnson, poet and librarian Philip Larkin, film producer Anthony Minghella, Titanic fourth officer and survivor Joseph Groves Boxhall, curator Thomas Sheppard, marine artist Thomas Somerscales, socialist and historian John Saville, artist James Neal, film directors Ralph Thomas and Gerald Thomas, actress Dorothy Mackaill, playwright Alan Plater CBE, palaeobiologist and astrobiologist professor Martin Brasier, historian Chris Ketchell, singer and songwriter Lal Waterson, writer and publisher of Philip Larkin's books Jean Hartley and pioneering female cinematographer Kay Mander.

There is a neighbourhood map detailing all the famous people that lived in the area and the address of their houses. See external links.

== See also ==
- List of areas in Kingston upon Hull
- Trams in Kingston upon Hull, Trolleybuses in Kingston upon Hull, Hull Botanic Gardens railway station; transport links on Princes Avenue
