= Zachariah Pearson =

English shipowner

Zachariah Charles Pearson
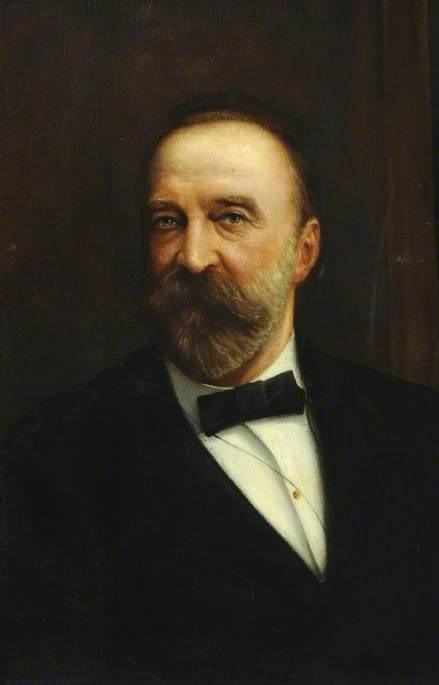
- Born: 1821
- Died: 1891 (aged 69–70)

Zachariah Charles Pearson (1821–1891) was an English shipowner, best known today for the gift of land to Kingston upon Hull, East Riding of Yorkshire, which was used to establish the City's first public park, later known as Pearson Park.

He was bankrupted in the 1860s owing to the loss of ships which were attempting to trade with the Confederate states during the United States civil war, in an ill-fated effort to buy cotton in order to reopen Hull's cotton mills.

== Biography ==
Pearson was born, to Zachariah and Elizabeth, in the Sutton area of east Hull. At 12, he stowed away on a ship, but was returned home until he was 16, when he recruited as a cabin boy. By the age of 21 he was captain, four years later acquiring his own ship, and going on to build a successful shipping business. As a member of Trinity House, he was a keen advocate of the marine trade and commercial business of Hull, and one of the leading shipowners to initiate a dock improvement scheme. He was frequently invited to Whitehall to advise the Board of Trade. He played a key role in social welfare in the city, including financial contributions to the conversion of a bank building in Salthouse Lane into a Sailors’ Home in 1860 and the opening of the Hull Temporary Home for Fallen Women in Nile street in 1861. He chaired the Restoration Committee for Holy Trinity Church and built Beverley Road Wesleyan Chapel.

Pearson held the offices of Sheriff of Kingston upon Hull in 1858, and Mayor (Chief Magistrate and Officer) in 1859 and 1861.

During his first term as Mayor he was instrumental in organising the construction of Hull's first purpose built Town Hall (begun in 1862 and opened in 1866, to a design of Cuthbert Brodrick). His was the Council that broke the deadlock of providing Hull with a clean water supply, and in 1862 he 'turned the first sod' at Stone Ferry where the reservoir would store the artesian water piped in from the west of Hull.

In 1860 Pearson gifted 27 acres (11 ha) of the 37 acres (15 ha) of land he had acquired near Beverley Road to the Hull Board of Health, for the establishment of a public park (now named Pearson Park), keeping the remainder of the land for building development; and paid £300 for the construction of an access road. In this way, he aimed to provide relaxation space and clean air for the workers to breathe, and a desirable residential location for Hull’s businessmen and merchants to remain in the town and continue to contribute towards its success. The plan was to reimburse the Council’s expenditure in laying out the park from the sale of the villa plots around the periphery of the park. Pearson handed over the Deed to the Park at a ‘Colossal Fete’ in August 1862.

During his second term as Mayor, the American Civil War began, resulting in the closure of the two cotton mills in Hull and the loss of many jobs; the Hull Flax and Cotton Mill alone employed 1,500 workers. In the early 1860s Pearson had acquired several ships on credit from the Banking house of Overend and Gurney; In 1862 he tried to use these ships to break the blockade of the Confederate states and bring back the cotton bales needed in order to reopen the mills and restore jobs. For some, this apparent support for the Confederate cause puts Pearson, a Wesleyan, at variance with the abolitionist views held by some of his non-conformist peers.

Whatever its motivation, the venture did not go well. Six of the ships were captured by the Federal forces, and a seventh was run aground and sank. Coupled with the previous loss of two ships in the Baltic and another to fire in the Thames, London it led to business failure, after which three more vessels were sold at a pittance. Pearson was declared bankrupt in 1864 with £646,000 of debts and liabilities. He had resigned as Mayor of Hull and as Commandant of the Hull Volunteer Artillery in October 1862.

Before his financial crash Zachariah Pearson had been hailed as one of Hull's great philanthropists. His disgrace was severe, and distressing to him. The Bankruptcy Commissioner was sympathetic, describing him as the victim of bad luck, who had made some bad judgements, and two of the charges were thrown out; Pearson was discharged on the other two for three months each, without imprisonment. Many of his creditors, who had supported him despite knowing the risky business he was engaged in, heaped scorn and vitriol on him. The Town Council too was upset when the Assignees claimed the income from the sale of the villa plots and left the Council to foot the bill for laying out the Park. Pearson's name was omitted from the marble statue of Queen Victoria he had commissioned for the Park, and for which he had paid a handsome deposit; Mayor Moss paid the outstanding cost to the Assignees and his is the name on the statue today. Pearson's considerable assets were sold to pay his creditors, and he dedicated the remaining 27 years of his life to working to repay his debts. He gradually rebuilt his civic standing, and by 1875 was a guest of honour and speaker at the opening of The Avenues residential project in the town.

Zachariah Charles Pearson died in Hull in 1891 at his residence in Pearson Park, the people's park that is his tangible lasting legacy. His other legacy is the controversy that still surrounds his role in the development of Hull.

== Pearson, Coleman & Co ==
In 1844 he married Mary Ann Coleman. They had 7 children who survived infancy. In 1854 he went into partnership with his brother-in-law, James Coleman. Pearson, Coleman & Co ships included Gertrude, Spurn and Sydenham.

== See also ==
- List of sheriffs of Kingston upon Hull
- List of mayors of Kingston upon Hull.
