= Count de Werdinsky =

Count Adolphe de Werdinsky (later) Dr. David Beck
- Born: March 1803
- Died: 22 September 1856; Kingston upon Hull, England
- Known for: Assaults on women Fraud; Parasitism; Invention relating to gun cotton Impersonating a Polish officer

Adolphe de Werdinsky (Note: Also written as: Adolph, Werdinskey; Werdinski; Wardinski; Wordenskoi; Werdenskoi) (1803–1856) was a central European, according to accounts written at his death, a displaced Polish nobleman, who had served under Józef Bem and was subsequently exiled. Other sources show him as a manipulator and predator upon women and a fraud.

Several details about his life are uncertain, both his nobility and military service were questioned by other Polish refugees in his lifetime. He was involved in several cases involving assaults on women including sexual assaults, and was involved in cases against himself relating to fraud or attempted fraud: he was put in debtors' prison in 1837, and in 1844 was found bankrupt during a case in which he was brought to court for attempting to defraud a woman of her inheritance. He was also involved in a failed invention for an engine powered by gun-cotton.

In 1850, after a case of assault on his adopted daughter was found to be true he moved from London, to Southampton, then Hull; renamed himself Dr. Beck, he moved to Hull in around 1855, and died in 1856, in abject poverty, of heart and lung problems, and starvation.

A tombstone was erected on his behalf in 1857 in the Hull General Cemetery, inscribed as the Count de Werdinsky.

== Biography ==
According to accounts published on his death, (Note: The biographies published in newspapers after his death (Note: The story was repeated in newspapers in several countries, including Allgemeine Zeitung, Le Siècle, The New York Times (5 November 1856). Locally the story was also repeated in Hull Packet and East Riding Times(26 Sep 1856), and Hull Advertiser (27 September 1856). The accuracy of the newspaper biography is uncertain.) make no reference to the arrests, cases, insolvencies and other unsavoury events occurring from 1830 to 1848 to an Adolphe de Werdinsky, mostly whilst he lived in London, which are well documented elsewhere. The obituary newspaper accounts commonly state him to have been involved in the Hungarian Revolution of 1848, and make no reference to his presence in England before then. Some also state he was 'Hungarian'. (In an 1851 census Dr. Beck is recorded as having been born in Hungary.) The association with the 1848 uprising is likely to be an error, confusing the 1848 Hungarian uprising with the 1830 November Uprising of Poles against, which Bem had also been active in (the accounts state that he served as a medical officer under Józef Bem. Werdinsky himself stated that he had been forced to leave in 1830 due to his resistance to Russia. The accounts also refer to his loss of £1,500 through an investment in an iron business with a Jew.) Adolphe de Werdinsky was born in 1803, in Worden castle, near the Carpathian Mountains, near a town called Galatzia (see Galicia, Eastern Europe). The only son of a Polish general, Count Adolphe de Werdinsky, and a Polish princess who died in childbirth; he had a private education at home, and showed an aptitude for languages, becoming fluent in several.

According to his obituary, his father was killed by a cossack in Russia, at which point he inherited his father's estate and title. He attained a degree of a Physician in Vienna, but became involved in a revolutionary movement, (Note: The newspaper obituaries state an "anti-Austrian" movement, but the date and earlier statements suggest it was related to the 1830 anti-Russian November Uprising.) and was betrayed; as a result, he lost his property, leaving him without an income, and was forced to escape the county disguised as a shepherd. He lived in Spain, before returning to Austria, believing it was safe to return, but was unable to recover his property. According to his own account from his 1844 trial, he had been forced to leave Poland in 1830/1 due to his resistance to Russian occupation.

In 1835, as a result of arguments leading to challenges for a duel between Werdinsky and other persons, several reports were published in London newspapers on the subject. As a result, Werdinsky's status as a Polish nobleman, as his claim to have been a Polish officer was called into question. A request was made to publish a 'caution to the public' concerning Werdinsky in the Times:

The Polish exiles residing in England having ascertained that a certain Werdinski, a man of middle stature, dark complexion, and gentlemanlike appearance, who wears a dark-blue embroidered coat with several order ribands, and who calls himself a count and a Polish officer, has been impudent enough to collect under these false pretensions in London as well as in the country subscriptions for the Polish exiles, they feel themselves in duty bound to acquaint the English public that a true honest Polish refugee prefers rather suffer the greatest distress than to debase himself by begging. They therefore most respectfully caution the public against this individual, who never served in the Polish army, and never took any part in the last Polish revolution

— J. Milewski, secretary of the "Committee of the Polish Emigration in England, 19 October 1835,

In 1837, in London, England he was imprisoned due to a debt of £11 10 shillings. He was found bankrupt in 1844 during a trial; in 1844 a case was brought on behalf of an Esther Elizabeth Atlee who it was claimed had been defrauded by Werdinsky into giving him £2000, by misrepresenting himself, and entering into her affections.

Adolphe de Werdinsky was involved in several cases and investigations in England involving violence against women: he was also charged with sexual violation of a twelve-year-old girl whilst in prison in 1844, but the case was not pursued; also an assault of a female servant in 1845, the accusation did not proceed to a formal indictment; he had also been arrested in 1835 for an indecent assault, which was dismissed as being a case of impersonation. In 1847 an argument of the cleaning of shoes led to a charge of physical assault against his landlady, a Mrs. Cundy.

He also took an interest in a patent of Sir James Anderson, 1st Baronet, and a William Fenton, Part 7 of Patent 11273.), relating to the use of gun cotton (xyloidine) in a type of internal combustion engine. The proposed engine involved igniting a ribbon of the xyloidine directly in an intermediate 13 in (330 mm) diameter copper sphere, which acted as a muffler for the percussion of the initial ignition; the pressured gas obtained would then be used to drive pistons avoiding the use of a large boiler.

..for an engine of two-horse-power, a thread, not larger in size than ladies' sewing-cotton, is sufficient; and the working machinery need not, be larger than a man's hat

— De Werdinsky,

The invention was never built; Werdinsky's invention was discussed in a series of letters in the Mining Journal, with many responding sceptically, stating the corrosive nature of the gases produced from gun cotton combustion, as well as the cost of the material, as barriers to success. Werdinsky's claims were well-publicised and were eventually satirised in Punch.

In 1850 a case was brought against him for beating Mary Ann Richards (born c.1835), who he had adopted in 1845. In January 1851 a jury found a true bill against him on the charge of assault.

He then began work as a physician in Southampton, practising under the name of Dr. Beck, but was unsuccessful due to the lack of an English diploma. He married a much younger woman in Southampton, who was sometimes assumed to be his domestic servant. After a short period in the Netherlands, he moved to Kingston upon Hull (c.1855); there he attempted to earn a living teaching German at the Mechanic's Institute but was unsuccessful in obtaining students. In Hull though lacking money he kept this situation secret. He briefly worked as a locum tenens for a Dr. Archbald.

The Werdinskys' fate was such abject poverty that they lacked the money to buy food and had no possessions in the house, which could be sold. Visitors had been excluded from the house, and their situation was generally unknown until shortly before Adolpe de Werdinsky died; he had attempted to hide his impoverished state. His death was attributed to heart and lung diseases, which were generally thought to have been exacerbated or caused by his starvation. He died 22 September 1856, aged 53.

== Literature ==
- Deighton, Alan (2014), "A Shocking Case of Starvation in Hull" - A Short Memoir of the Life of "Count" Adolph de Werdinsky, Highgate Publications (Beverley) Ltd, ISBN 978-1902645612
