= George Gilbert Scott Jr. =

Architect from England (1839–1897)

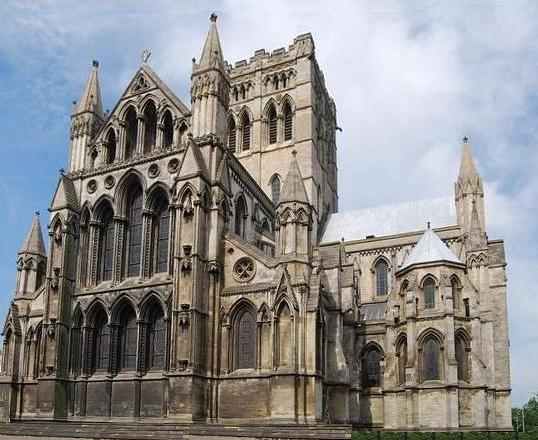
St John the Baptist RC Cathedral, Norwich

George Gilbert Scott Jr. (8 October 1839 – 6 May 1897) was an English architect working in late Gothic and Queen Anne revival styles.

Known in later life as "Middle Scott", he was the eldest son of Sir George Gilbert Scott and the father of Sir Giles Gilbert Scott and Adrian Gilbert Scott, all also architects.

The last years of his life after the death of his father were marred by mental instability and excessive drinking. He died of cirrhosis of the liver in the Midland Grand Hotel, St Pancras, a building designed by his father.

== Biography ==
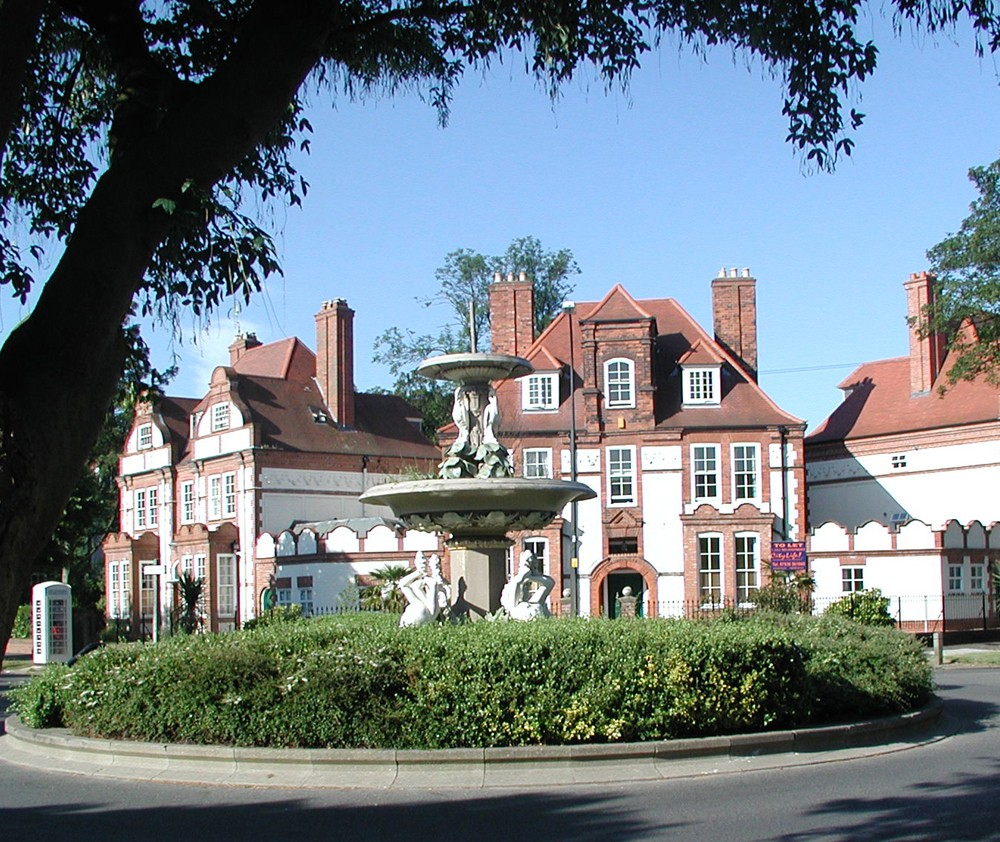
Gilbert Scott houses in The Avenues, Hull

Scott was born in London on 8 October 1839. He was the eldest son of George Gilbert Scott and his wife, Caroline Oldrid. After a scholarship at Eton College, he began training at his father's office. He was admitted to Jesus College, Cambridge, in 1863, taking a first-class degree in moral sciences in 1866 (graduating B.A. 1867, M.A. 1870).

During the 1860s and 1870s, he worked in his father's architectural practice. He married Ellen King Sampson in the 1870s.

He founded Watts & Company in 1874 along with two other leading 19th-century architects: George Frederick Bodley (the architect of Washington National Cathedral) and Thomas Garner. Bodley, Garner, and Scott all lived in Church Row in London's Hampstead district in the 1860s and '70s and would regularly meet to discuss ideas.

Among the buildings he designed was St John the Baptist Church, Norwich, which became a Roman Catholic cathedral. He was also responsible for buildings in three of the University of Cambridge's colleges: Christ's, Pembroke and Peterhouse. He masterminded the main buildings of Dulwich College in South London. Some of his finest works, the churches of All Hallows, Southwark (1877), and St Agnes, Kennington (1880) were destroyed by Second World War bombing. His best remaining residential work, in a Queen Anne revival style, is found in the Avenues area of Kingston upon Hull. Much of his work was in the Queen Anne style, or in imitation of later Gothic architectural styles.

After his father died in 1878, he became distant from the architectural business, and was supported by his inheritance. In 1880 Scott became a Roman Catholic, to the astonishment of his family. The later part of his life saw his mental stability questioned, and in 1883 he was placed in Bethlem Hospital. A petition of his brothers and wife resulted in his being found of unsound mind in a public examination in 1884. He escaped to Rouen in France but, returning to England in 1885, he was confined to hospital again in 1885 and 1891–1892.

Scott died on 6 May 1897 from cirrhosis of the liver whilst in residence in the Midland Grand Hotel, St Pancras, which had been designed by his father, and was buried on 11 May 1897 at St John-at-Hampstead.

He had six children, four of whom survived past childhood. Two of his sons, Sir Giles Gilbert Scott and Adrian Gilbert Scott, went on to become noted architects.

== Sources ==
- Stamp, Gavin (2004). "Scott, George Gilbert (1839–1897), architect and scholar". Oxford Dictionary of National Biography (online ed.). Oxford University Press. doi:10.1093/ref:odnb/60773. (Subscription, Wikipedia Library access or UK public library membership required.)
- Stamp, Gavin (2002). An Architect of Promise: George Gilbert Scott Jr and the Late Gothic Revival. Shaun Tyas. ISBN 978-1-900289-51-1.
