= Thomas Earle (sculptor) =

British sculptor

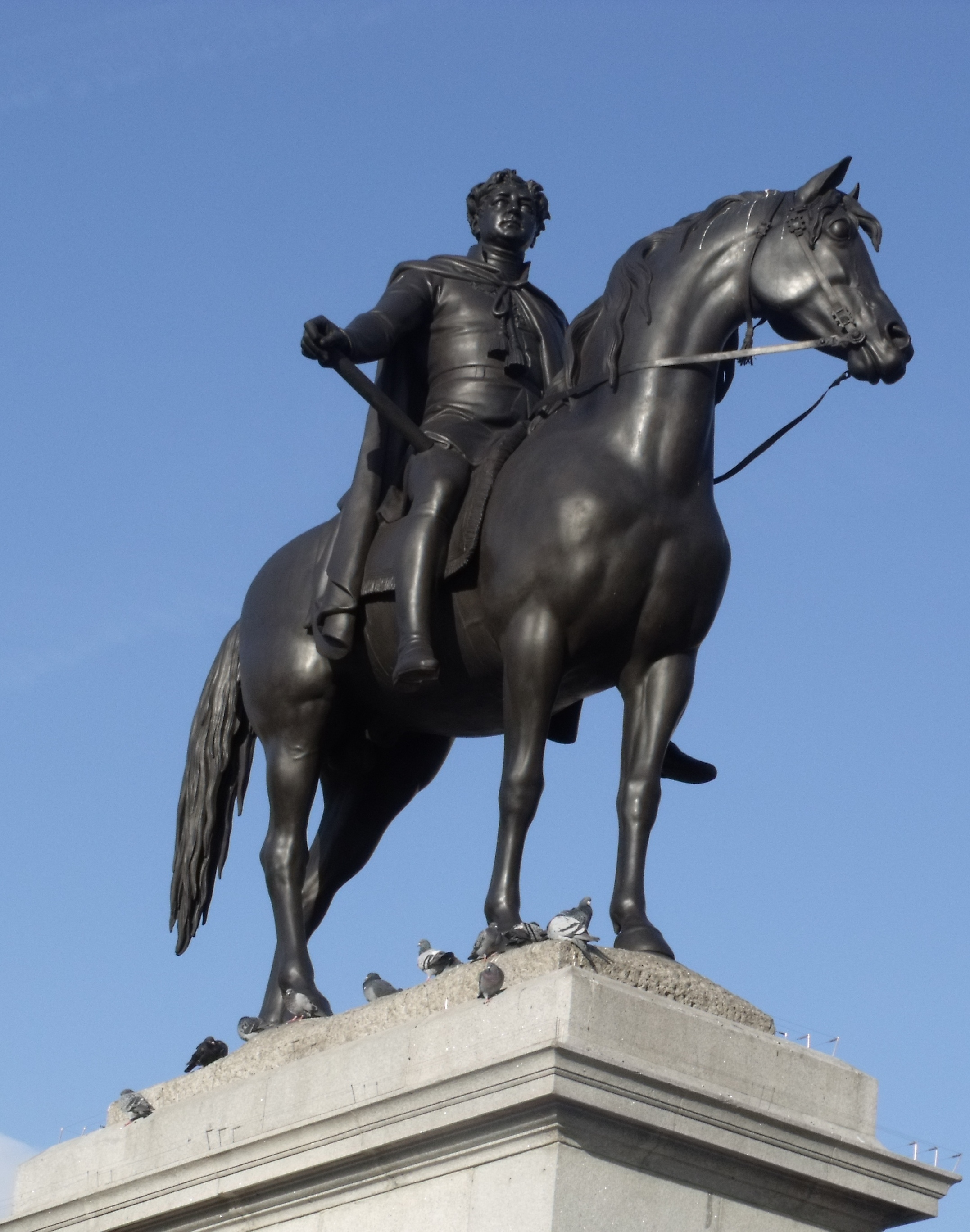
Statue of King George IV in Trafalgar Square, London

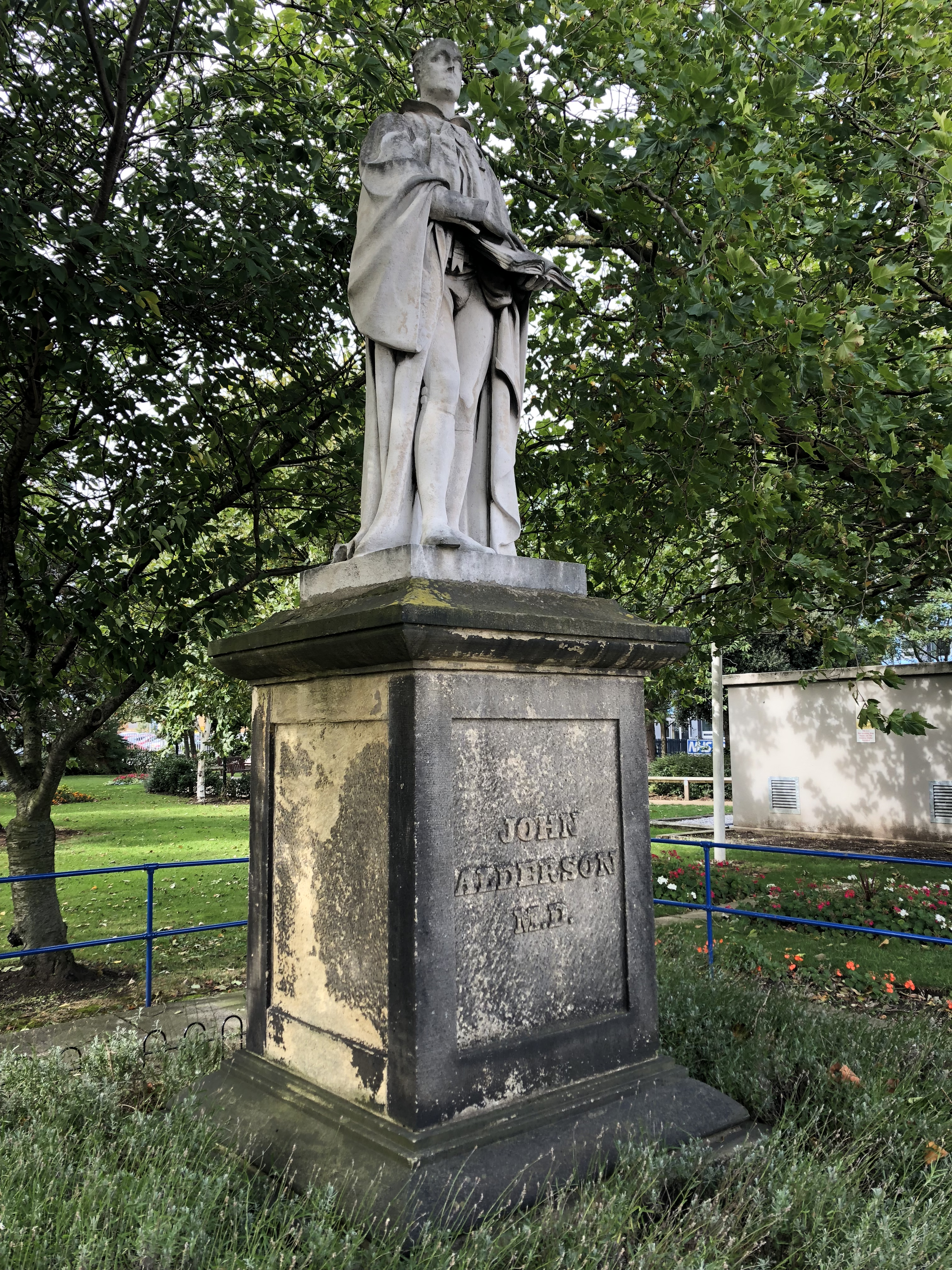
Statue of Dr John Alderson at Hull Royal Infirmary

Thomas Earle (1810–1876) was a 19th-century British sculptor.

== Life ==
He was born at Osborne Street in Hull in June 1810 the eldest of 12 children of John Earle (1779-1863) a sculptor. He was baptised at Holy Trinity Church on 5 December 1810. His uncles owned the shipping company C & W Earle.

He studied at the local Mechanics Institute. He was apprenticed under his grandfather, George Earle (1748-1827) but, showing much talent, was sent to London in 1830 to train under Francis Chantrey. He attended the Royal Academy Schools from 1832. In 1839 he received a gold medal for his group "Hercules Delivering Hesione".

He exhibited at the Royal Academy from 1843 to 1873 and at the British Institution from 1843 to 1865.

He returned to Chantrey's studio shortly before Chantrey's death and completed several of his works including the statue of George IV commissioned for Trafalgar Square. He left Chantrey's studio in 1842 and had his own studio by 1851 at Vincent street, Ovington Square.

He died suddenly in Hull on 2 May 1876 and is buried in Spring Bank Cemetery. He is commemorated in Holy Trinity Church by a monument of his own design.

A bombing raid on Hull in 1943 destroyed a large quantity of his work held in Hull Central Museum.

== Family ==
In 1841 he married Mary Appleyard, daughter of builder Frank Appleyard.

== Artistic recognition ==
He was painted by Thomas Brooks around 1840, and the portrait is held by Hull Museum.

== Works ==
- Statue of Dr John Alderson (1832) at Hull General Infirmary
- The James Brothers (1837) exhibited at Royal Academy
- Bust of Richard Thornton
- George IV on Horseback (1842) Trafalgar Square
- John Todd (1843) exhibited at Royal Academy
- Richard Bethell (1845) exhibited at Royal Academy
- The Morning Ablution (1845) Manchester Institution
- Miss Todd (1845) Tranby Park, Yorkshire
- An Ancient Briton Protecting His Family (1844) Westminster Hall
- Sin Triumphant (1845) Westminster Hall
- Earl of Zetland (1846) in Minerva Hall, Hull
- Earl of Yarborough (1848) exhibited Royal Academy
- Sir Samuel Warren (1850) exhibited at British Institution
- Ophelia (1851) at Great Exhibition
- Pastorella (1851) at Great Exhibition
- Jacob and Rachel (1851) at Great Exhibition
- L'Allegro (1852) National Exhibition
- Happy as a Queen (1853) for the Earl of Yarborough
- Rt Hon. Thomas Sydney (1854) exhibited Royal Academy
- Bust of Queen Victoria (1861) Buckingham Palace
- Queen Victoria (1863) in Pearson Park in Hull
- Prince Albert (1863) Kennington
- King Harold (1864) Mansion House, London
- Edward I (1866) Guildhall in Hull
- Thomas Teale (1867) Leeds General Infirmary
- Prince Albert (1868) in Pearson Park in Hull

== Grave Monuments ==
- Sykes grave (1832) Kirk Ella west of Hull
- Elizabeth Flavell (1833) Barsham in Suffolk
- Monument to Ann Earle (1834), Hull Minster
- Mary Burland (1835) South Cave Yorkshire
- Joseph Pease (1840) St Mary's Church, Hull
- Charles Bamford (1845) St Mary's Church, Sculcoates
- Sir Charles Anderson of Broughton (1846) Lea, Lincolnshire
- Monument to mariner and alderman Thomas Ferres (1850), Hull Minster
- Monument to John Gray (1858), Hull Minster
- Charles Bamford Jr. (1860) St Mary's Church, Sculcoates
- John Holmes (1860) St Mary's Church, Sculcoates
- Monument to Frank Appleyard, his wife's father, and her uncle John (1860), Hull Minster
- Monument to Lt. Gen. Sir Robert Dundas K.C.B., St Leonard's, Loftus, North Yorkshire.
