= Diana (1840 ship) =

Steam powered whaling ship built in Bremen, Germany

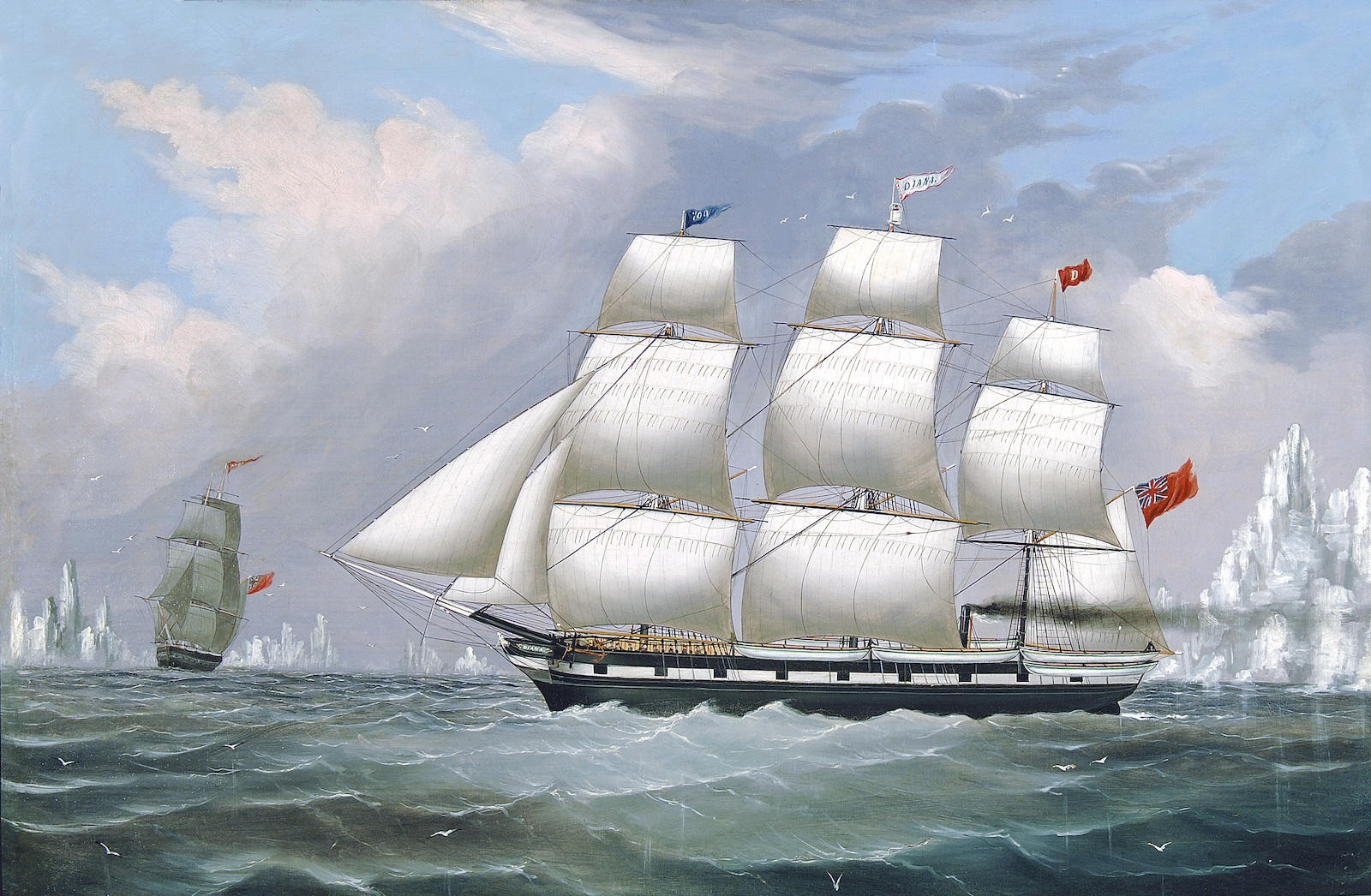
- Whaling ships Diana (foreground) and Anne in the Arctic. Painting by James H. Wheldon

History

United Kingdom
- Name: Diana
- Builder: Bremen, Germany
- Launched: 1840
- Out of service: 20 October 1869
- Homeport: Hull
- Fate: Grounded on the Lincolnshire coast while returning home in 1869
- Notes: Most famous for its disastrous 1866-7 expedition when it was trapped in ice off Greenland for many months, resulting in the death of 13 of its crew before its eventual return.

General characteristics
- Type: Whaler
- Displacement: 355 long tons (361 t)
- Length: 117 ft (36 m)
- Beam: 29 ft (8.8 m)
- Draught: 17 ft 6 in (5.33 m)
- Propulsion: Steam Engine, 40 hp (30 kW)
- Sail plan: Barque
- Range: Limited by water and provisions
- Complement: 51

Diana was a whaling ship built in 1840, in Bremen, Germany. She sailed out of Hull, England. In 1858 a steam engine was installed, making her the first steam-powered whaler to sail from Hull (Tay from Dundee was the first ever, a year earlier). Records held in Kingston upon Hull, claimed that the steam engine was installed in Diana in 1857, and, according to Dundee websites, in Tay in 1859.

== Trapped in the ice ==
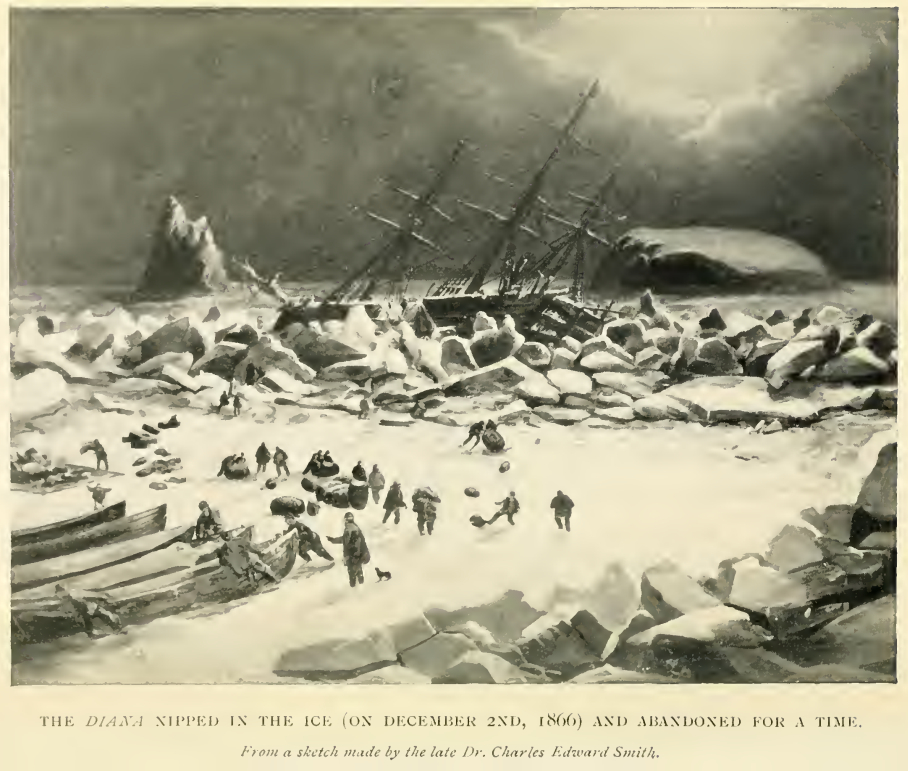
The Diana nipped in the ice, on 2 December 1866, and abandoned for a time, taken from the diary of the voyage by the ship's doctor; Charles E. Smith

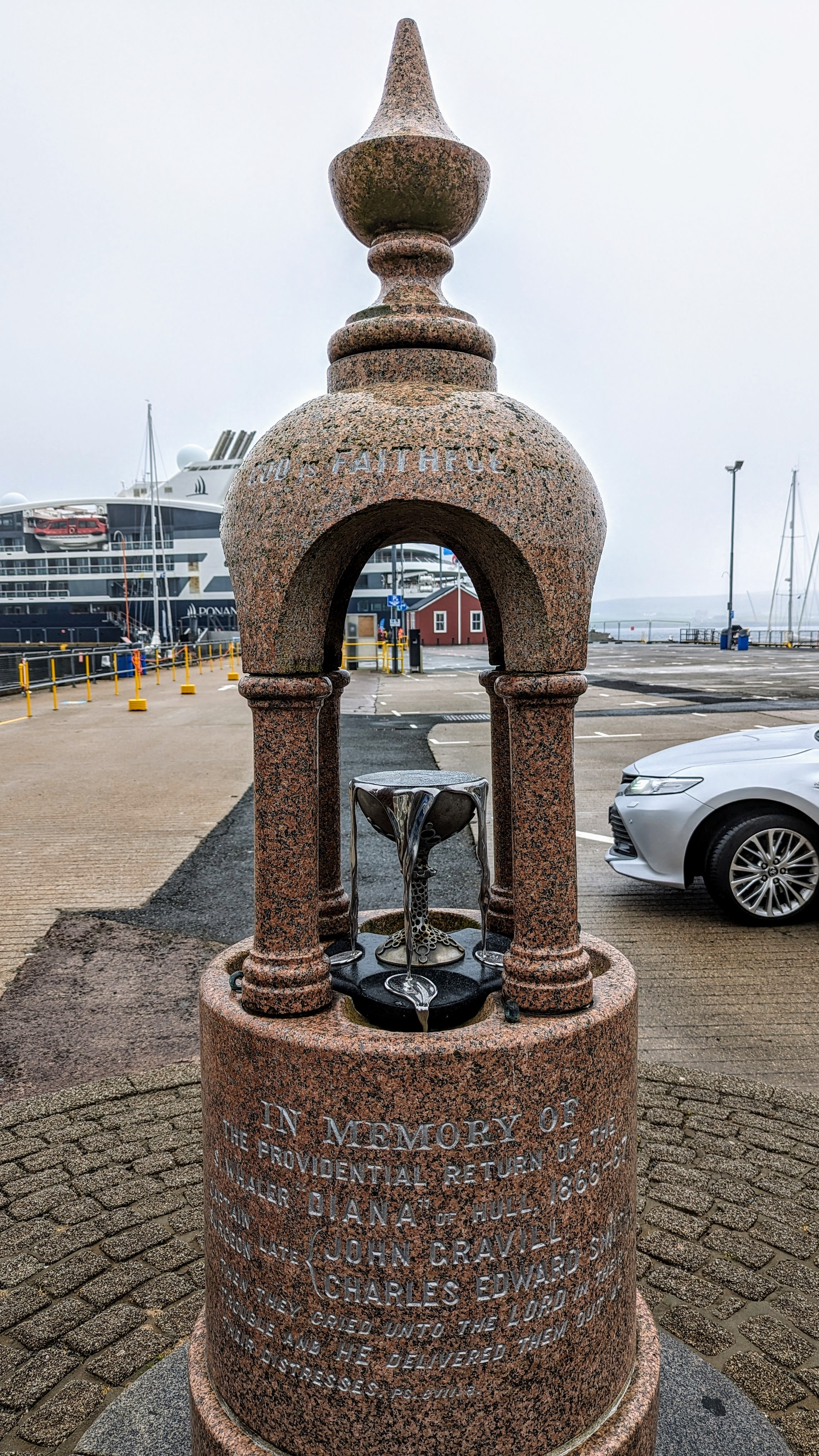
Memorial to the dead—and the return of the survivors—of the Whaler "Diana" at Victoria Pier, Lerwick, Shetland Islands

In 1866, while on a whaling expedition in Baffin Bay, Diana became frozen in the ice, where it was trapped for over six months. The ship's captain, 64-year-old John Gravill, and many of the crew died. The diary of the ship's doctor, Charles Edward Smith, was published in the book From the Deep of the Sea. (ISBN 0-87021-932-4). After the death of Gravill, the ice-master George Clarke took command of the ship and William Lofley navigated the Diana to Lerwick. There is a memorial fountain to Diana's return from the ice in the town of Lerwick in the Shetland Islands, as many of the crew originated from the islands and all the deceased except the captain were buried there. Charles Smith's services and heroism were recognised by the award of a set of surgical instruments from the Board of Trade. Captain Gravill's body was taken back to Hull, and his funeral was attended by an estimated fifteen thousand people.

== Fate ==
On 20 October 1869, while making her way back from the Davis Strait, Diana encountered a strong gale, and was washed into the Donna Nook sands, on the Lincolnshire coast, and broke up. Her crew were rescued by the lifeboat North Briton. Diana was the last whaling ship from the port of Hull. Her loss ended the whaling industry of the city.

== Captains ==
This is a partial list of Captains of Diana:

- John Gravill Sr. (1856–57, 1861, 1865-1867 [died on board])
- George Clarke (14 February 1867 – 16 April 1867) (Elected Captain after the death of John Graville whilst the ship beset in the ice)
- John Gravill Jr. (1858–60)
- William Wells (1863)
- Robert Day (16 April 1867-Loss)

== See also ==
- Whaling in the United Kingdom
