= Listed buildings in the East Riding of Yorkshire =

Buildings of special importance in the East Riding of Yorkshire, England

There are a number of listed buildings in the East Riding of Yorkshire. The term "listed building", in the United Kingdom, refers to a building or structure designated as being of special architectural, historical, or cultural significance. Details of all the listed buildings are contained in the National Heritage List for England. They are categorised in three grades: Grade I consists of buildings of outstanding architectural or historical interest, Grade II* includes significant buildings of more than local interest and Grade II consists of buildings of special architectural or historical interest. Buildings in England are listed by the Secretary of State for Culture, Media and Sport on recommendations provided by English Heritage, which also determines the grading.

Some listed buildings are looked after by the National Trust or English Heritage while others are in private ownership or administered by trusts.

== Listed buildings by grade ==
- Grade I listed buildings in the East Riding of Yorkshire
- Grade I listed churches in the East Riding of Yorkshire
- Grade II* listed buildings in the East Riding of Yorkshire

== Listed buildings by civil parish or ward ==
The lists are by parishes in parished areas and for the unparished areas, they are by electoral wards.

- Listed buildings in Airmyn
- Listed buildings in Aldbrough, East Riding of Yorkshire
- Listed buildings in Allerthorpe
- Listed buildings in Anlaby with Anlaby Common
- Listed buildings in Asselby
- Listed buildings in Atwick
- Listed buildings in Bainton, East Riding of Yorkshire
- Listed buildings in Barmby Moor
- Listed buildings in Barmby on the Marsh
- Listed buildings in Barmston, East Riding of Yorkshire
- Listed buildings in Beeford
- Listed buildings in Bempton
- Listed buildings in Beswick, East Riding of Yorkshire
- Listed buildings in Beverley (central and northeast areas)
- Listed buildings in Beverley (north area)
- Listed buildings in Beverley (south area)
- Listed buildings in Beverley (southeast area)
- Listed buildings in Beverley (west and southwest areas)
- Listed buildings in Bewholme
- Listed buildings in Bielby
- Listed buildings in Bilton, East Riding of Yorkshire
- Listed buildings in Bishop Burton
- Listed buildings in Bishop Wilton
- Listed buildings in Blacktoft
- Listed buildings in Boynton, East Riding of Yorkshire
- Listed buildings in Brandesburton
- Listed buildings in Brantingham
- Listed buildings in Bridlington (Old Town area)
- Listed buildings in Bridlington (Quay area)
- Listed buildings in Bridlington (Sewerby and Marton)
- Listed buildings in Broomfleet
- Listed buildings in Bubwith
- Listed buildings in Bugthorpe
- Listed buildings in Burstwick
- Listed buildings in Burton Agnes
- Listed buildings in Burton Constable
- Listed buildings in Burton Fleming
- Listed buildings in Burton Pidsea
- Listed buildings in Carnaby, East Riding of Yorkshire
- Listed buildings in Catton, East Riding of Yorkshire
- Listed buildings in Catwick
- Listed buildings in Cherry Burton
- Listed buildings in Cottam, East Riding of Yorkshire
- Listed buildings in Cottingham, East Riding of Yorkshire
- Listed buildings in Cottingwith
- Listed buildings in Dalton Holme
- Listed buildings in Driffield
- Listed buildings in Easington, East Riding of Yorkshire
- Listed buildings in East Garton
- Listed buildings in Eastrington
- Listed buildings in Ellerby, East Riding of Yorkshire
- Listed buildings in Ellerker
- Listed buildings in Ellerton, East Riding of Yorkshire
- Listed buildings in Elloughton-cum-Brough
- Listed buildings in Elstronwick
- Listed buildings in Etton, East Riding of Yorkshire
- Listed buildings in Everingham
- Listed buildings in Fangfoss
- Listed buildings in Flamborough
- Listed buildings in Foggathorpe
- Listed buildings in Foston on the Wolds
- Listed buildings in Full Sutton
- Listed buildings in Garton
- Listed buildings in Gilberdyke
- Listed buildings in Goodmanham
- Listed buildings in Goole
- Listed buildings in Goole Fields
- Listed buildings in Gowdall
- Listed buildings in Halsham
- Listed buildings in Harpham
- Listed buildings in Hatfield, East Riding of Yorkshire
- Listed buildings in Hayton, East Riding of Yorkshire
- Listed buildings in Hedon
- Listed buildings in Hessle
- Listed buildings in Hollym, East Riding of Yorkshire
- Listed buildings in Holme-on-Spalding-Moor
- Listed buildings in Holmpton
- Listed buildings in Hook, East Riding of Yorkshire
- Listed buildings in Hornsea
- Listed buildings in Hotham, East Riding of Yorkshire
- Listed buildings in Howden
- Listed buildings in Huggate
- Listed buildings in Humbleton
- Listed buildings in Hutton Cranswick
- Listed buildings in Keyingham
- Listed buildings in Kilham, East Riding of Yorkshire
- Listed buildings in Kilpin
- Listed buildings in Kingston upon Hull (Avenue Ward)
- Listed buildings in Kingston upon Hull (Beverley Ward)
- Listed buildings in Kingston upon Hull (Boothferry Ward)
- Listed buildings in Kingston upon Hull (Bricknell Ward)
- Listed buildings in Kingston upon Hull (Drypool Ward)
- Listed buildings in Kingston upon Hull (Holderness Ward)
- Listed buildings in Kingston upon Hull (Ings Ward)
- Listed buildings in Kingston upon Hull (Marfleet Ward)
- Listed buildings in Kingston upon Hull (Myton Ward)
- Listed buildings in Kingston upon Hull (Newington Ward)
- Listed buildings in Kingston upon Hull (Newland Ward)
- Listed buildings in Kingston upon Hull (Pickering Ward)
- Listed buildings in Kingston upon Hull (Southcoates East Ward)
- Listed buildings in Kingston upon Hull (Southcoates West Ward)
- Listed buildings in Kingston upon Hull (St Andrew's Ward)
- Listed buildings in Kingston upon Hull (Sutton Ward)
- Listed buildings in Kingston upon Hull (University Ward)
- Listed buildings in Kirby Underdale
- Listed buildings in Kirk Ella
- Listed buildings in Kirkburn
- Listed buildings in Laxton, East Riding of Yorkshire
- Listed buildings in Leconfield
- Listed buildings in Leven, East Riding of Yorkshire
- Listed buildings in Lockington, East Riding of Yorkshire
- Listed buildings in Londesborough
- Listed buildings in Lund, East Riding of Yorkshire
- Listed buildings in Mappleton
- Listed buildings in Market Weighton
- Listed buildings in Melbourne, East Riding of Yorkshire
- Listed buildings in Middleton on the Wolds
- Listed buildings in Millington, East Riding of Yorkshire
- Listed buildings in Molescroft
- Listed buildings in Nafferton
- Listed buildings in Newbald
- Listed buildings in Newport, East Riding of Yorkshire
- Listed buildings in North Cave
- Listed buildings in North Dalton
- Listed buildings in North Ferriby
- Listed buildings in North Frodingham
- Listed buildings in Nunburnholme
- Listed buildings in Ottringham
- Listed buildings in Patrington
- Listed buildings in Paull
- Listed buildings in Pocklington
- Listed buildings in Pollington
- Listed buildings in Preston, East Riding of Yorkshire
- Listed buildings in Rawcliffe, East Riding of Yorkshire
- Listed buildings in Reedness
- Listed buildings in Rimswell
- Listed buildings in Rise, East Riding of Yorkshire
- Listed buildings in Riston
- Listed buildings in Roos
- Listed buildings in Rowley, East Riding of Yorkshire
- Listed buildings in Rudston
- Listed buildings in Sancton
- Listed buildings in Seaton, East Riding of Yorkshire
- Listed buildings in Seaton Ross
- Listed buildings in Shiptonthorpe
- Listed buildings in Sigglesthorne
- Listed buildings in Skeffling
- Listed buildings in Skerne and Wansford
- Listed buildings in Skidby
- Listed buildings in Skipsea
- Listed buildings in Skirlaugh
- Listed buildings in Skirpenbeck
- Listed buildings in Sledmere
- Listed buildings in Snaith and Cowick
- Listed buildings in South Cave
- Listed buildings in South Cliffe
- Listed buildings in Sproatley
- Listed buildings in Stamford Bridge, East Riding of Yorkshire
- Listed buildings in Sunk Island
- Listed buildings in Sutton upon Derwent
- Listed buildings in Swanland
- Listed buildings in Swine, East Riding of Yorkshire
- Listed buildings in Swinefleet
- Listed buildings in Thorngumbald
- Listed buildings in Thornton, East Riding of Yorkshire
- Listed buildings in Thwing, East Riding of Yorkshire
- Listed buildings in Tibthorpe
- Listed buildings in Tickton
- Listed buildings in Twin Rivers, East Riding of Yorkshire
- Listed buildings in Ulrome
- Listed buildings in Walkington
- Listed buildings in Warter
- Listed buildings in Watton, East Riding of Yorkshire
- Listed buildings in Wawne
- Listed buildings in Welton, East Riding of Yorkshire
- Listed buildings in Welwick
- Listed buildings in Wetwang
- Listed buildings in Wilberfoss
- Listed buildings in Willerby, East Riding of Yorkshire
- Listed buildings in Withernsea
- Listed buildings in Withernwick
- Listed buildings in Wold Newton, East Riding of Yorkshire
- Listed buildings in Woodmansey
- Listed buildings in Wressle
- Listed buildings in Yapham
