= Listed buildings in Kingston upon Hull =

Wikimedia list article

Kingston upon Hull is a city and unitary authority in East Riding of Yorkshire, England. It contains over 480 listed buildings that are recorded in the National Heritage List for England. They an be found in the lists by ward as follows:

- Listed buildings in Kingston upon Hull (Avenue Ward)
- Listed buildings in Kingston upon Hull (Beverley Ward)
- Listed buildings in Kingston upon Hull (Boothferry Ward)
- Listed buildings in Kingston upon Hull (Bricknell Ward)
- Listed buildings in Kingston upon Hull (Drypool Ward)
- Listed buildings in Kingston upon Hull (Holderness Ward)
- Listed buildings in Kingston upon Hull (Ings Ward)
- Listed buildings in Kingston upon Hull (Marfleet Ward)
- Listed buildings in Kingston upon Hull (Myton Ward)
- Listed buildings in Kingston upon Hull (Newington Ward)
- Listed buildings in Kingston upon Hull (Newland Ward)
- Listed buildings in Kingston upon Hull (Pickering Ward)
- Listed buildings in Kingston upon Hull (Southcoates East Ward)
- Listed buildings in Kingston upon Hull (Southcoates West Ward)
- Listed buildings in Kingston upon Hull (St Andrew's Ward)
- Listed buildings in Kingston upon Hull (Sutton Ward)
- Listed buildings in Kingston upon Hull (University Ward)
