= East Park, Kingston upon Hull =

Park in Kingston upon Hull, East Riding of Yorkshire, England

Coordinates: 53.76583°N 0.30083°W

East Park
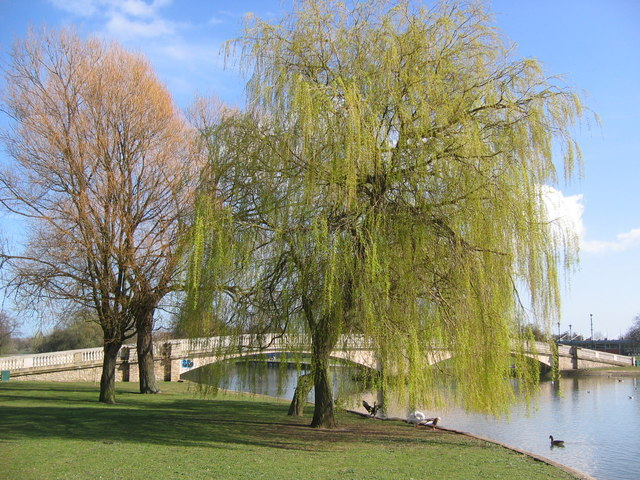
- The bridge renovated in 2008
- Interactive map of East Park
- Type: Municipal
- Location: Kingston upon Hull
- Area: 120 acres (49 ha)
- Created: 1887
- Operator: Hull City Council
- Status: Open all year

East Park is a major park of about 120 acres (49 ha) situated on the Holderness Road in Hull, East Riding of Yorkshire, England. East Park is registered a Grade II listed site by English Heritage. It is the largest public park in Hull and is often used for large open-air venues such as concerts and the annual Hull Show.

== History ==
East Park first opened to the public on 21 June 1887—the day the country celebrated Queen Victoria's Golden Jubilee. About 20 years earlier, in the west of the city, Zachariah Pearson had established Hull's first public park, which was initially known as The People's Park and later simply as Pearson Park. Then, in 1882, with Pearson Park established in the west, the Parks Committee began to look at possible locations for a park in the east. They eventually decided on a site close to the terminus of the horse-drawn tramway which ran along Holderness Road, and they agreed to pay £16,909 7s 6d to Mrs Anne Watston's Trust for 38 acres 2 roods and 24 perches of her land (approx. 15 ha). An insight into how East Park's Victorian founders came to choose its site, and into their hopes for the role it might play within the community, is found in the accountant's report of 1883.

"...A more picturesque locality of that extent it would be impossible find on the East side of the Borough or one more adapted to restore the jaded energies of the artisan or man of business when the labours of the day are ended.".

The decision to establish a major public park in eastern Hull was taken during the early 1880s. Construction formally began on 3 March 1885 when Alderman John Leak, chairman of the Special Parks Committee, turned the first sod at a ceremony attended by the Marquis of Ripon. A specially commissioned ceremonial spade bearing the arms of Hull was produced for the occasion by Thomas Kirk & Co. of Whitefriargate (Hull Daily News, 4 March 1885).Later in 1885, the Parks Committee discussed funding arrangements for the project. The Borough Engineer estimated that East Park would cost approximately £15,000, while local businessman E. P. Dixon donated trees for the park (Hull Packet, 27 February 1885.)

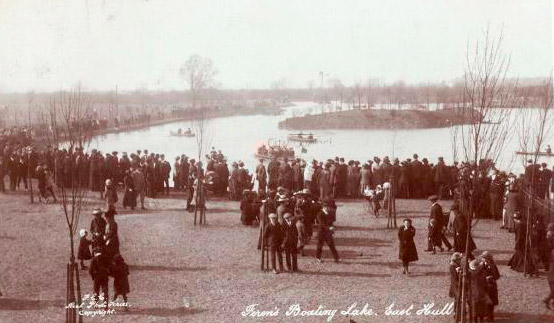
The Ferens Boating Lake, East Park, in 1914

Work was soon under way to construct the city's new green space, and by 1886 the project was providing 140 much needed jobs in a time of high unemployment, with the possibility that the total figure might climb as high as 200. The construction of East Park was also viewed as a means of addressing unemployment. During the ceremony marking the beginning of the works, the Mayor noted that the project had provided employment during a period of economic hardship and helped relieve distress among local workers during a difficult winter. Most of the men were earning up to 18s a week but around ten were paid a couple of shillings more. When Jubilee Day arrived the following summer, large crowds lined the route of a parade which marched from the city centre, where a new covered market was officially opened, along Lowgate, Whitefriargate, and Holderness Road to its end point in the new park. There is no record of any official decision to adopt the name East Park, and at the opening ceremony Alderman W.F.Chapman suggested that it should be called Victoria Park. However, East Park it remained, and as local historian Mary Fowler remarks "...with the economy of expression so common in these parts, East Park is, as often as not, just 'Park' to the people of East Hull.".

East Park was formally opened on 21 June 1887 during celebrations marking Queen Victoria's Golden Jubilee. Although some work remained incomplete, around 50 acres had been laid out with walks, ornamental lakes and a fountain. A civic procession travelled from the Town Hall to the park, where the Mayor described it as a "park for the people" and highlighted its role in providing recreation for the growing population of East Hull. He estimated the total cost of the scheme at approximately £20,000.

During the opening ceremony, the Mayor described East Park as a "park for the people" and emphasised its importance to the rapidly growing communities of eastern Hull. He stated that approximately 77 acres had been acquired and developed for the project, including 38 acres purchased from the Watson Charity, and estimated the total cost of the scheme at about £20,000. The park was expected to serve a district whose population was projected to reach 45,000 within a few years. A temporary triumphal arch decorated with evergreens was erected at the park entrance for the opening celebrations. The structure incorporated a royal shield and displayed the dates 1837 and 1887 in recognition of Queen Victoria's Golden Jubilee, together with civic symbols associated with the Corporation of Hull.

A temporary triumphal arch decorated with evergreens was erected at the park entrance for the opening celebrations. The structure incorporated a royal shield and displayed the dates 1837 and 1887 in recognition of Queen Victoria's Golden Jubilee, together with civic symbols associated with the Corporation of Hull.

Although East Park officially opened to the public on 21 June 1887 as part of Queen Victoria's Golden Jubilee celebrations, contemporary reports noted that the park was not yet fully complete. Nevertheless, sufficient work had been carried out to allow the public to make use of the grounds during the summer while development continued. By the time of its opening, approximately 50 acres of the park had been laid out with walks, ornamental features and several small lakes, one of which contained a fountain. Contemporary accounts highlighted the attractiveness of the new recreational ground and its accessibility, with tram services passing close to the main entrance on Holderness Road. At its opening in 1887, East Park comprised approximately 77 acres, considerably smaller than its present extent. Contemporary reports stated that around 38 acres had been purchased from the Watson Charity, while additional land was provided by the Corporation.

From the beginning East Park and its counterpart in the west were focal points for many kinds of recreational activity. East Park did not offer the archery and quoits available in Pearson Park, but football, cricket, tennis and bowls were popular. The Model Yacht Pond had its own Yacht House (20 ft x 15 ft (6 m x 5 m)) and a flagpole for team colours. Enthusiasts could read about competitions involving the tiny craft in the local newspaper: an edition in June 1912, for example, revealed that the boats had to contend with "a light northerly breeze, the course being a beat to windward.". Concerts in both parks drew large audiences: a performance in Pearson Park, one Friday evening in July 1901, entertained 15,000 spectators.

Views of East Park. Video

The popularity of East Park kept the authorities busy. When The Shop Assistants Union complained that its late-working members were unable to attend the concerts, and so "girls of 13 and 14 years never have a chance to hear the music", they found a champion in Hull Daily Mail columnist "Mother Humber", who wanted the concerts moved to Thursday, which was early-closing day. Footballers' poor behaviour and swearing were cause for concern for the Parks Superintendent, but the cricketers and the model-boaters appear to have escaped his disapprobation. Bowls, like tennis, required careful handling when assessing the competing claims of the general public and organised teams, all of whom wanted access to the facilities during the few short hours "when the labours of the day are ended".

Before 1930 the park gradually expanded eastwards to occupy a triangular area of land more or less equivalent with its present-day boundaries. The new land, bounded on the north by the Summergangs Dyke and Holderness Road on the south, took in the George V Playing Fields and a series of old clay pits. Surviving park features from the era include the Ferens boating lake which was established on land donated by T.R. Ferens in 1913 and extended in 1923, a double arched bridge with decorative balustrades built around 1925, and a rare water chute ride – known locally as the "Splash Boat" – which is Grade II listed.

A £10.3 million refurbishment on site has returned the East Park recreational area to its former condition. New visitor attractions include a giant walk-through aviary, an animal education centre, a boat house and a community pavilion. The Victorian Khyber Pass, Splash Boat, original maze and the Valley Ornamental Gardens have been restored. In addition, special help points have been installed so that visitors can call for a park ranger or first aid.

The Heritage Lottery Fund contributed £6.4 million to the refurbishment project, which was completed in 2008.

The Splash Boat, designed by the engineer Charles Wicksteed, was constructed in 1929, and was Grade II listed in 2003. It underwent a £35,000 restoration in 2012. The only other surviving example of a Wicksteed water chute is at Wicksteed Park, erroneously described in the latter's publicity as "unique", despite the continued operation of the one in Hull.

In late 2015 planning permission was sought and granted by the council to extend the car park of the adjacent Woodford Leisure Centre into the park removing a large amount of green space. This was despite the objections of residents and of some council departments notably those responsible for wildlife and green spaces.

A new memorial to Mick Ronson was unveiled on 2 June 2017 in the park.

== See also ==
- Listed buildings in Kingston upon Hull (Holderness Ward)

== Bibliography ==
- Fowler, Mary (2002). The Story of East Park, Hull. Highgate Publications (Beverley) Limited. ISBN 1-902645-27-8.
