= Listed buildings in Kingston upon Hull (Southcoates East Ward) =

Southcoates East Ward is a ward in the city and unitary authority of Kingston upon Hull, East Riding of Yorkshire, England. It contains seven listed buildings that are recorded in the National Heritage List for England. All the listed buildings are designated at Grade II, the lowest of the three grades, which is applied to "buildings of national importance and special interest". The ward is in Southcoates, an area to the east of the centre of the city, and is largely residential. The listed buildings consist of three structures in Hedon Road Cemetery, two schools, a group of shops, and a telephone kiosk.

== Buildings ==
Name and location	Photograph	Date	Notes
Former Chapel and Crematorium, Hedon Road Cemetery; 53.75132°N 0.28887°W		1899	The former chapel and crematorium are in brick with stone dressings and slate roofs. They have a T-shaped plan, with a west porch and a bell tower also acting as a chimney on the south side. The tower is square with four stages, a string course, bands, lancet windows with hood moulds, and a moulded and dentilled cornice to a pyramidal roof with a central flue. The porch is gabled and contains a doorway with a pointed arch and a hood mould.
Columbarium (south), Hedon Road Cemetery; 53.75099°N 0.28945°W		1899	The columbarium consists of irregular masses of tufa, brick and concrete, mostly rendered, forming an irregular wandering avenue about 70 metres (230 ft) in length. The cells in the walls are covered by inscribed tablets of marble and granite.
Columbarium (southeast), Hedon Road Cemetery; 53.75090°N 0.28851°W	—	Early 20th century	The columbarium consists of irregular curving parallel walls of tufa, brick and concrete, mostly rendered, about 10 metres (33 ft) in length. The cells in the walls are covered by inscribed tablets of marble and granite.
Southcoates Lane Education Centre; 53.75734°N 0.29288°W		1910–11	A school designed by J. H. Hirst. It is in red brick, the upper floor roughcast and colourwashed, with stone dressings, a floor band, brick quoins, dentilled eaves, and a tile roof with pedimented gables, each containing a round window with four brick keystones. There are two storeys and fronts of nine and six bays, with a central block flanked by parallel ranges at right angles. Most of the windows are tilting casements with flat arches and stepped brick keystones. There are also large Diocletian windows with mullions and transoms, voussoirs and a keystone.
Southcoates Lane Primary School; 53.75730°N 0.29340°W		1910–11	A school designed by J. H. Hirst. It is in red brick, the upper floor roughcast and colourwashed, with stone dressings, a floor band, brick quoins, dentilled eaves, and a tile roof with pedimented gables, each containing a round window with four brick keystones. There are two storeys and an H-shaped plan, with fronts of nine and ten bays. Most of the windows are tilting casements with flat arches and stepped brick keystones, and there are round windows over the doorways.
614–620 Holderness Road; 53.76276°N 0.29685°W		1912	A group of four shops on a corner site in yellow brick with stone at the front. There are three storeys and fronts of four and two bays, and a splayed corner. On the ground floor are four shopfronts under a common fascia cornice on brackets. The upper floors contain paired Ionic columns and an entablature with a modillion cornice. Between them are tripartite sash windows, above which are transomed Diocletian windows. Over these is a balustrade with pedestals and volutes.
Telephone kiosk 53.76371°N 0.29540°W		c. 1930	The telephone kiosk in Holderness Road is of the K6 type designed by Giles Gilbert Scott. Constructed in cast iron, it is a square domed kiosk with illuminated top panels and margin glazing to the sides and the door.
