= Listed buildings in Kingston upon Hull (University Ward) =

University Ward is a ward in the city and unitary authority of Kingston upon Hull, East Riding of Yorkshire, England. It contains 28 listed buildings that are recorded in the National Heritage List for England. All the listed buildings are designated at Grade II, the lowest of the three grades, which is applied to "buildings of national importance and special interest". The ward is to the northwest of the centre of the city, and is mainly residential. Many of the listed buildings are associated with Newlands Homes, a group of orphanages and ancillary buildings built by the Port of Hull Society and endowed by various benefactors. The main campus of the University of Hull is in the ward, and nine university buildings are listed. The others consist of a house, a school, a public house, and a church.

== Buildings ==
Name and location	Photograph	Date	Notes
Etherington House; 53.77303°N 0.35494°W		Mid-18th century	A farmhouse, later a private house, in brick, the rear wing rendered, with a moulded eaves band, and a roof of pantile and slate with coped gables and kneelers. There are two storeys and attics, and an L-shaped plan, with a front range of five bays and a rear wing. In the centre is a flat-roofed porch and a doorway with a fanlight, flanked by canted bay windows. The other windows on the front are sashes, and on the right return is an attic casement window. Also on the right return is a porch with a hipped roof.
Buckston Browne House, Newland Homes; 53.76893°N 0.35846°W		1895	An orphanage, later a private house, in yellow brick on a plinth, with stone dressings, a ground floor lintel band, an upper floor sill band, bracketed eaves and slate roofs. There are two storeys, six bays, and two gabled rear wings. In the centre is a projection with a hipped roof containing a gabled datestone with the name of the benefactor. The doorway has a fanlight, and the windows are sashes.
Hannah Pickard House, Newland Homes; 53.76891°N 0.35786°W		1895	The former orphanage is in yellow brick on a plinth, with stone dressings, a lintel band, an upper floor sill band, and slate roofs. There are two storeys, six bays, and two gabled rear wings. In the centre is a canted projection containing a commemorative plaque with a gabled hood mould. The doorway has a fanlight, and the windows are sashes.
East Lodge, Newland Homes; 53.76877°N 0.35749°W		c. 1896	The former lodge to a group of orphanages, it is in yellow brick on a plinth, with stone dressings, a ground floor lintel band, an upper floor sill band, and a slate roof with a gable and a traceried bargeboard. There are two storeys, two bays, and a cruciform plan, The porch is in an angle, the windows are sashes, and there are two through-eaves dormers.
James Reckitt House, Newland Homes; 53.76894°N 0.35890°W		1896	The former orphanage, paid for by James Reckitt, is in yellow brick on a plinth, with stone dressings, a ground floor lintel band, an upper floor sill band, and a slate roof with gables and traceried bargeboards. There are two storeys, six bays, and two gabled rear wings. The centre projects, and contains two windows on the upper floor, over which is a shaped moulded lintel and a datestone with the inscribed name of the benefactor, and below is a canted bay window with a hipped roof. In the angle of the right return is a hipped porch canopy on wooden posts, and a doorway. To the left is a hipped triangular bay window, and the other windows are sashes.
Sir Titus Salt House, Newland Homes; 53.76923°N 0.35900°W		1896	The former orphanage, paid for by Titus Salt, is in yellow brick on a plinth, with stone dressings, a floor band, and a slate roof with gables and traceried bargeboards. There are two storeys and eight bays. The central block has a lean-to canopy over a square bay window, with a doorway to the left and a commemorative plaque to the right, and these are flanked by projecting gabled wings. Most of the windows are sashes, and there is a central through-eaves dormer.
Trinity House, Newland Homes; 53.76942°N 0.35750°W		1896	The former orphanage, paid for by Hull Trinity House, is in yellow brick on a plinth, with stone dressings, a floor band, and a slate roof with gables and traceried bargeboards. There are two storeys and eight bays. The central block has a lean-to canopy over a square bay window, with a doorway to the left and a commemorative plaque to the right, and these are flanked by projecting gabled wings. Most of the windows are sashes, and there is a central through-eaves dormer.
William Richardson House, Newland Homes; 53.76888°N 0.35727°W		1896	The orphanage, later used for other purposes, is in yellow brick on a plinth, with stone dressings, a ground floor lintel band, an upper floor sill band, and a slate roof with traceried bargeboards to the central gable. There are two storeys and six bays. The centre projects and contains two sash windows, over which is an inscribed lintel and a shaped datestone. On the centre of the left return is a square bay window, and in the angle is a porch canopy on wooden posts, with a hipped roof and a doorway. The windows are sashes.
Dr Lee House, Newland Homes; 53.76971°N 0.35761°W		1897	An orphanage, later used for other purposes, in yellow brick on a plinth, with stone dressings, a floor band, and a slate roof with gables and traceried bargeboards. There are two storeys and eight bays. In the centre is a lean-to canopy over a square bay window, with a doorway to the left and a commemorative plaque to the right, and these are flanked by projecting gabled wings. Most of the windows are sashes, and there is a central through-eaves dormer.
Francis Reckitt House, Newland Homes; 53.76956°N 0.35910°W		1897	The former orphanage, paid for by Francis Reckitt, is in yellow brick on a plinth, with stone dressings, a ground floor lintel band, an upper floor sill band, and a slate roof with gables and traceried bargeboards. There are two storeys, five bays, and two gabled rear wings. The recessed central bay contains a doorway with a mullioned fanlight, and to the left is a window over which is an inscribed and dated panel. The flanking bays project, they are gabled, and each contains a canted bay window with a hipped roof. Most of the other windows are mullioned and transomed casements.
St Andrews House, Newland Homes; 53.76942°N 0.35750°W		1897	The former orphanage is in yellow brick on a plinth, with stone dressings, a floor band, and a slate roof with traceried bargeboards to the main gable. There are two storeys and six bays. The central bays project under a gable, and contain paired sash windows under a segment-headed hood mould, framing a commemorative plaque. Below is a square bay window with a hipped roof, to the left is a triangular bay window, and to the right, in the angle, is a porch on wooden posts with a hipped roof. The other windows are sashes.
St Nicholas School; 53.77006°N 0.35850°W		c. 1897	The school, originally an ancillary building to Newland Homes, is in yellow brick on a plinth, with stone dressings, string courses, and slate roofs. There are two storeys and a cruciform plan, with a front of three bays, the outer bays forming hipped cross-wings. The main south gable has two flanking canted buttresses rising to pinnacles. In the centre is a flat-headed four-light lancet window, above which is an inscribed panel. On the roof is a square clock tower with a pyramidal roof and a finial.
West Lodge; Newland Homes; 53.76895°N 0.35922°W		c. 1897	The former lodge to a group of orphanages, it is in yellow brick on a plinth, with stone dressings, and a slate roof with studded bargeboards to the main gables. There are two storeys and two bays. On the front, the left bay has a gable, and in the centre is a doorway flanked by canted bay windows. The other windows are sashes.
Captain Allison House, Newland Homes; 53.77014°N 0.35925°W		1898	An orphanage, later used for other purposes, in yellow brick, with stone dressings and slate roofs. There is one storey and eight bays, and it consists of a central block with a hipped roof, and flanking side wings. In the centre is a large square gabled bay window containing a square recessed inscribed and dated panel. Most of the windows are sashes, and there are gabled through-eaves dormers. On the left and recessed is a bungalow linked by a corridor. This has a central porch and a doorway under a semicircular hood on brackets, flanked by square bay windows.
Stratten Hall and Board Room Block, Newland Homes; 53.77046°N 0.35861°W		1901	The assembly hall and adjoining block are in yellow brick with stone dressings and slate roofs. The hall has a single storey and a cruciform plan, and a hipped roof on which is a louvred bell turret with a lead ogee dome and a finial. On the north is a double doorway with flanking buttresses and an inscribed lintel. The gables have buttresses rising above them with pinnacles, and on the west gable peak is a square inscribed panel. Most of the windows are mullioned cross-casements. The adjoining block contains a board room, kitchens and staff accommodation. It has two storeys and five bays, and the windows are sashes. At the rear is a two-storey wing and a single-storey cross range enclosing a yard.
Whitby and Hartlepool House, Newland Homes; 53.76956°N 0.35909°W		1902	An orphanage, later used for other purposes, in yellow brick on a plinth, with stone dressings, a ground floor lintel band, an upper floor sill band, and a slate roof with traceried bargeboards to the main gables. There are two storeys and eight bays. The centre projects under a hipped roof, and the larger ground floor windows are divided by a gabled brick buttress. Above the doorway is an inscribed datestone with a crest. The outer wings contain square bay windows under a hipped roof, and the other windows are sashes.
Derwent Building, University of Hull; 53.77011°N 0.37031°W		1909–13	The university library is in brick and a stone, with stone dressings and hipped slate roofs. There are two storeys, a central block of three bays, and flanking five-bay wings. The cental block has quoins, a dentilled cornice and pediment, a balustrade, and a square clock turret with a weathervane. In the centre is a recessed porch with two Doric columns in antis, flanked by canted bay windows with latticework balconies. Above is a round-arched cross mullioned casement window with a double keystone and pilasters. The side wings have quoins and panelled pilasters, and contain sash windows with double keystones.
Rye House, University of Hull; 53.76928°N 0.36926°W		1909–13	A lodge, later used for other purposes, it is in red brick with rusticated quoins, dentilled wooden eaves, and a hipped tile roof. There is a single storey and attics, and two bays. The central doorway is flanked by canted bay windows, and above are two hipped roof dormers.
Ryton Lecture Theatre, University of Hull; 53.77047°N 0.37026°W		1909–13	A gymnasium, later converted into a lecture theatre, the building is in red brick, with sandstone details, and a tile roof with semicircular ridge tiles. There is a single storey, a main block of five tall bays with a hipped roof, and lower single-storey bays with flat roofs. The outer bays of the main block project slightly, and have quoins of alternating brick and stone, and segmental pediments with moulded stone coping. Each bay contains a circular window, and the right bay also has a wide doorway. The intermediate bays have a plinth, they are separated by pilasters, and each contains a large casement window. The flanking bays each contains a doorway with a moulded architrave, and two sash windows with soldier lintels.
Wharfe Building and gateway, University of Hull; 53.76985°N 0.36973°W		1909–13	The building is in brick and stone, with stone dressings and slate hipped and mansard roofs. It consists of a central block with flanking wings and projecting end pavilions. The central block has four storeys and three-storey side bays with swept parapets. There are quoins and a floor band. The doorway has pilasters, and a swan-neck pediment embracing a mullioned window with an open pediment and a double keystone. It is flanked by canted bay windows with latticework balconies. Above the doorway is a tall four-light cross-mullioned window, a chequerboard panel, and a Diocletian window. The flanking five-bay wings contain sash windows, those on the ground floor in round-arched recesses, with double keystones. At the left end is as gateway containing a central opening with square polychrome gate piers with plinths and cornices.
Newland School for Girls; 53.77230°N 0.37134°W		1914	The school, which was designed by J. H. Hirst, is in red brick with stone dressings and hipped slate roofs. There are two storeys, in part with attics, and a front of 36 bays. The school has an F-shaped plan, with a central block flanked by wings and end pavilions. The central block and pavilions have rusticated quoins, pilasters, moulded cornices, and pierced balustrades with central pediments. On the centre block is a pedimented portico with paired Doric columns, a moulded round-arched entrance with a keystone, and a recessed doorway with a fanlight. Above is an open pediment with a Diocletian window. Most of the windows are cross-casements. To the left of the west end is a two-story five-bay library with a domed bell turret and louvred ventilators.
Haworth Arms Public House; 53.76865°N 0.35402°W		1925	A public house on a corner site, it is in red brick on a chamfered plinth, with applied timber framing, stone dressings and a tile roof. There are two storeys, fronts of three and eight bays, and an angled bay on the corner. On the corner bay is a projecting porch containing a segmental-arched entrance and flanked by cross-casement windows. The upper floor is jettied and timber framed, and contains a canted oriel window over an inscribed pargeted panel. Above are coved eaves and a gable with bargeboards. The left return has an upper floor balustraded balcony, and to the left is a gabled bay containing an oriel window over a bay window. The right return has a similar balcony over an elliptical-headed doorway with a hood mould. To the right is a gabled bay with an oriel window, and beyond are four bays with a segmental-arched doorway and mullioned windows.
Venn Building, University of Hull; 53.76988°N 0.36855°W		1927	The University Administration Building is in brick with stone dressings, and roofs of slate and copper. It is in two and three storeys and attics, with fronts of 15 and 16 bays. The middle three bays of the entrance front project, and have pilasters, rusticated quoins, and a round-arched doorway with a hood mould. The outer three bays at each end project as pavilions, with pilasters and rusticated quoins. Most of the windows are cross-casements, and there are box dormers with hipped roofs.
Cohen Building, University of Hull; 53.76967°N 0.36697°W		1928	The Earth Sciences Building is in brick on a plinth, with stone dressings, a moulded floor band, and roofs of tile and copper. There are two storeys and attics, a square plan with an inner courtyard, and fronts of 14 and eleven bays. The south, west and east fronts have end pavilions with pilasters and rusticated quoins. The centre of the north range projects, it has four storeys and attics and three bays, and contains a segment-arched double doorway. Most of the windows are mullioned and transomed casements, and there are roof dormers.
St Alban's Church; 53.77291°N 0.38392°W		1938	The church, which was completed in 1954, is in orange brick with pantile roofs. It consists of a nave and a chancel in one with a clerestory, north and south aisles incorporating porches, shallow north and south gabled transepts, a sacristy at the east end, and a west tower embraced by the aisles. The tower is square and plain, and contains a west doorway, above which is a three-light window, and at the top are seven bell openings flanked by mullions that rise to form an embattled parapet. Along the sides are five-light mullioned windows.
Sports Centre, University of Hull; 53.77392°N 0.36785°W		1963–65	The sports centre was designed by Peter Womersley, and is in reinforced concrete, plate glass and orange brick. There is a square plan, and the walls are slightly cambered to carry the projecting flat roof. The walls contain long narrow windows between tapering concrete mullions with a parabolic section. On the south front are three doorways, and the original eastern entrance cantilevered canopy has been enclosed. Projecting from the west front is a first-floor enclosed bridge linking the squash courts.
Middleton Hall, Chapel, and Larkin Building, University of Hull; 53.77010°N 0.36795°W		1965–67	The university buildings were designed by Leslie Martin. They are built in concrete and load-bearing brick, with cladding in pale red brick and lead roofs. Middleton Hall has a rectangular plan and three storeys, and a separate two-storey chapel at the east. A broad flight of steps leads up to the central doorway with a metal frame, under a cantilevered canopy. The Larkin Building to the north is longer and has three storeys, with alternating bands of brick walling. On the upper floors, square windows alternate with narrow side-opening lights.
Gulbenkian Centre, University of Hull; 53.77200°N 0.36735°W		1967–69	A drama teaching centre incorporating an adaptable theatre designed by Peter Moro. It has a copper beam construction, with red brick panels on the exterior, board-marked concrete above, and a copper-clad roof with a central shaped fly tower. The plan is of an elongated octagon with two storeys. On the diagonal corners are stairwells, the main entrance is on the south, and above the doors is a deep lintel with the name of the building. On the upper floor are elongated octagon windows. Inside, there is a flexible performance area.
