= Listed buildings in Kingston upon Hull (Newland Ward) =

Newland Ward is a ward in the city and unitary authority of Kingston upon Hull, East Riding of Yorkshire, England. It contains 18 listed buildings that are recorded in the National Heritage List for England. All the listed buildings are designated at Grade II, the lowest of the three grades, which is applied to "buildings of national importance and special interest". The ward is to the north of the centre of the city, and is mainly residential. The listed buildings include houses, churches and a chapel, a former railway station, a public house, schools and associated structures, headstones in a cemetery, a footbridge, public swimming baths, a war memorial street shrine, and a former silo.

== Buildings ==
Name and location	Photograph	Date	Notes
91, 93 and 95 Cottingham Road; 53.76852°N 0.36033°W		Late 18th century	Three houses in brick with pantile roofs, coped on the left, and hipped elsewhere. There are two storeys and the houses are in two blocks, the right with two houses and with seven bays and the left with one house and four bays, linked by a coped wall containing a segmental-headed opening. Each house has a portico with Doric columns and a cornice, and each outer house has a canted bay window. The windows on the left house are sashes, and on the right houses they are casements. On both blocks is a round-arched doorway with a semicircular fanlight with radial glazing.
Footbridge; 53.76866°N 0.36014°W		c. 1800	The footbridge crossing the former Cottingham Drain provides access to 91, 93 and 95 Cottingham Road. It is in cast iron, and has convex curved latticework railings on each side. At the inner end is a pair of openwork gate piers with caps, and at each side is a semicircular guard rail. There is a pair of iron gates with anthemion ornament.
Headstone to William Young, Sculcoates Cemetery; 53.76153°N 0.340592°W		1835	The headstone is in slate, and is rectangular with a semicircular top and ears. It has an inscription with scrolls above, and in the arched top is a relief carving of a globe surrounded by a scroll, an open book, a cannon, cannonballs, a bayonet, and a sabre.
Stepney Station House; 53.75690°N 0.34932°W		c. 1853	A railway station designed by William Botterill for the York and North Midland Railway, and later used for other purposes. It is in red and yellow brick, with painted stone dressings, corner pilasters, modillion eaves, and slate roofs. It consists of a central block with two storeys and three bays, and flanking single-storey single-bay gabled wings. In the centre of the main block is a round-headed window with a keystone, and a pilastered surround with an entablature, and above it is a pair of round-headed windows. The outer bays are gabled and contain round-headed windows. The left wing contains a pair of tall round-headed windows and a roundel above. On the right wing is a round-arched doorway with a fanlight and sidelights.
Headstone to William Newmarch, Sculcoates Cemetery; 53.76166°N 0.34059°W		1854	The rectangular headstone, surround and footstone are in sandstone. The headstone is rectangular with a rounded top, and has an inscription. On it is a relief carving of a laurel wreath, a rifle and bayonet, and the battle honours.
Rockliffe House; 53.76592°N 0.35227°W		1864	The house, later used for other purposes, is in yellow brick on a plinth, with stone dressings, moulded brick dentilled eaves, and a tile roof. There are two storeys and attics, and three bays. In the centre is a square tower, with two stages, and a concave pyramidal pantile roof with cast iron railings and a windvane. Below is a portico with a traceried balustrade, a Tudor arched opening with octagonal piers, and a doorway with a fanlight. Above it is a French window with a pointed arch and a hood mould, and over that is a lancet window. The left bay projects, it is gabled, and contains a square bay window with a traceried balustrade and a three-light mullioned window, above which is a three-light window with a segmental hood mould and a pair of lancets. The right bay is recessed, it is gabled and contains mullioned and lancet windows.
Stepney Board School, Infants School and wall 53.75897°N 0.34860°W		1886	The schools are in brick with stone dressings and tile roofs. The main school has two storeys and attics, and twelve bays, the middle two and the outer three bays projecting under shaped gables. On the roof is an elaborate octagonal wooden bell turret with a lantern, a lead ogee dome and a weathervane. Attached at the rear is the infants' school with a single storey, that has coped gables, a square bell turret with a lead ogee dome, and a finial. Most of the windows in both schools are sashes, many on the main school with segmental heads and keystones. The boundary wall on the right return is in brick with blue brick coping. It contains two pairs of square gate piers, and extends for about 100 metres (330 ft).
George Lamb Memorial Chapel; 53.76325°N 0.35679°W		1893	The chapel, now derelict and roofless, is in yellow brick on a plinth, with stone dressings, a string course, and sill and eaves bands. The front has two storeys and five bays, the middle three bays projecting under a pediment containing an oculus. The ground floor has rusticated pilasters, a panelled frieze and a cornice, and contains a doorway with pilasters and a pediment, flanked by flat-headed windows. On the upper floor are Corinthian pilasters, and three round-headed windows with keystones. The outer bays contain a doorway with a pediment on curved brackets, and above are round-headed windows. On the front are inscribed sill bands and a frieze.
The Bull Public House; 53.75867°N 0.34893°W		1903	The public house was designed by William Botterill. It is in red brick, the ground floor clad in terracotta, with terracotta dressings, moulded sill bands, a frieze, a cornice and a hipped tile roof. There are three storeys, and fronts of three and four bays. In the centre of the ground floor is a round-arched doorway with pilasters, and an elaborate scrolled keystone with festoons of leaves and a ball finial. The ground floor windows are elliptical-headed with a keystone and a hood mould. In the centre of the middle floor on each front is a round-arched window with a broken pediment, flanked by elliptical-headed windows with swan-neck pediments. On the corner is a wrought iron bracket carrying a gilt bull. On each front is an elaborate shaped gable with an inscribed cartouche and obelisk finials.
Beverley Road Swimming Centre; 53.75932°N 0.34897°W		1903–05	The public swimming baths were designed by J. H. Hirst, and are in brick with stone dressings. In the centre is a square three stage tower surmounted by an octagonal cupola with angle scroll brackets and a copper dome with an iron weathervane. The doorway has Ionic columns and a pediment, above it is a tall canted bay window with an arched hood, and over that is a small circular window. To the right is a gabled block with a pediment, containing seven windows with short Ionic pilasters, and a Venetian window above. To the left is a block with three bay windows, and two pedimented dormers with scroll brackets, and on the left corner is a bay with a smaller octagonal cupola and a copper dome.
East block, Sidmouth Street School; 53.76643°N 0.36163°W	—	1910–11	The school block, designed by J. H. Hirst, is in red brick, with stone dressings, polychrome quoins, a moulded sill band, a dentilled cornice and slate roofs. There are two storeys, the west front has six bays, and slightly projecting end pavilions with large dentilled semicircular pediments containing a round window and festoons. The windows are sashes, those on the upper floor with moulded lintels and keystones. The north and south fronts have a central recess with a flat-roofed projection, above which are sash windows, a segmental-headed tripartite sash window with a keystone and hood mould, and a similar pediment to the west front.
West block, Sidmouth Street School; 53.76645°N 0.36252°W		1910–11	The school block, designed by J. H. Hirst, is in red brick, with stone dressings, polychrome quoins, a moulded sill band, a dentilled cornice and slate roofs. There are two storeys, the east front has six bays, flanked by projecting three-bay wings with large dentilled semicircular pediments containing a round window and festoons. The windows are sashes, those on the upper floor with moulded lintels and keystones. In the centre of the south front is a projecting wing with a large dentilled semicircular pediment containing a round window and a festoon. On the roof is an octagonal wooden bell turret with a lead dome and a weathervane.
Northern Boundary Wall, Sidmouth Street School; 53.76664°N 0.36190°W		1911–12	The boundary wall, designed by J. H. Hirst, is in red brick with gabled blue brick coping. It contains intermediate square piers with flat caps. Near the centre is a gateway with plain brick piers, and to left is a gateway with a pair of square brick gate piers with ball finials.
Southern Boundary Wall, Sidmouth Street School; 53.76620°N 0.36202°W		1911–12	The boundary wall, designed by J. H. Hirst, is in red brick with gabled blue brick coping. It contains intermediate square piers with flat caps. To the right is a gateway with a pair of square brick gate piers with ball finials.
St Mary's Church; 53.76165°N 0.34464°W		1915–16	The church was designed by Temple Moore, and completed by his son, Leslie Moore, in about 1925. It is in red brick with Ancaster stone dressings and a slate roof, and incorporates columns from an earlier church. The church consists of a nave and a chancel with clerestories, north and south aisles, a west porch, north and southeast chapels, a vestry and a meeting room. Most of the windows are flat-headed with mullions, and at the east end is a three-light window with a segmental head.
War Memorial street shrine 53.76316°N 0.35898°W		1917	The street shrine in Sharp Street commemorates local men who served in the First World War. It consists of an oak cabinet containing a rectangular oak panel with a curved top and a scroll decoration including a name. There are five panels with 140 names This is enclosed by a moulded frame flanked by two narrow canted panels with gold-painted swags. The cabinet has a scroll pediment with a central oval frame containing a photograph of King George V flanked by the city arms. The cabinet is contained within a glazed aluminium security cabinet mounted on a free-standing brick plinth with stone coping.
Former silo and receiving house 53.75992°N 0.33577°W		1919	The silo at the oil extracting mill is in brick, with stone dressings, pilaster buttresses, a cornice and a parapet. There are six storeys and attics, and fronts of eleven and six bays. The south side of the parapet has raised lettering. On the corners, the pilasters rise above the cornice to form squat towers with bands, caps and cornices. On top of the southwest corner is a single-stage tower in rusticated stone with round-arched openings and keystones, surmounted by a water tank. Attached to the southwest corner is a receiving house with three storeys and fronts of four bays. The corner pilasters rise above the parapet to form coped towers.
Newland Methodist Church and meeting room 53.76844°N 0.35881°W		1928	The church is in brick on a plinth, with dressings in stone and concrete, an eaves band, coped parapets, hipped slate roofs, and an octagonal dome over the main block with an octagonal turret and volutes. There are two storeys, an octagonal plan, and pavilions at the corners. At the front is a recessed pedimented centre with angle pilasters. This contains a round-headed traceried window with a moulded surround, a bracketed sill and an elongated double keystone. Below is a projecting flat-roofed rusticated porch containing a central doorway, and two smaller flanking doorways. On the pavilions are two-light transomed windows with moulded surrounds and aprons. The meeting room at the rear has two storeys, a canted corner and contains sash windows.
