= Listed buildings in Kingston upon Hull (Newington Ward) =

Newington Ward is a ward in the city and unitary authority of Kingston upon Hull, East Riding of Yorkshire, England. It contains six listed buildings that are recorded in the National Heritage List for England. All the listed buildings are designated at Grade II, the lowest of the three grades, which is applied to "buildings of national importance and special interest". The ward is to the west of the centre of the city, and is mainly residential. The listed buildings consist of two schools, a former police fire box, a former library, a memorial, and two telephone kiosks.

== Buildings ==
Name and location	Photograph	Date	Notes
St George's Primary School and wall 53.74166°N 0.3754251°W		1881	The school is in brick on a plinth, with stone dressings and slate roofs. There is a single storey, 15 bays, and a central tower. The tower is square, with two stages, clasping buttresses, a string course, a corbel table, and a pyramidal roof with four hip roofed dormers and a weathervane. It contains an entrance with a pointed arch, a traceried fanlight and a hood mould, and above are two lancet windows with hood moulds. The outer bays contain gabled pairs of bays, and smaller gabled bays at the ends. Most of the windows are mullioned cross-casements, on the larger gables are round windows, and there are further dormers. The boundary wall is in brick with chamfered stone coping and piers with chamfered caps.
Former fire Box and gates 53.74398°N 0.37265°W		c. 1890	At one time a tram ticket office and a police fire box, later used for other purposes, with gates to West Park. The building is in brick on a plinth, with terracotta dressings, a moulded sill band, dentilled eaves, and hipped slate roofs. There is a single storey, the part to the right has three bays, and it has a central doorway flanked by windows, all with moulded ogee heads. The part to the left has two openings. In front are a pair of scrolled wrought iron gates and square coped piers.
Wheeler Street Primary School; 53.74105°N 0.38369°W		1902	The school is in red brick on a plinth, with stone dressings, sill bands, a floor band, moulded eaves, and slate roofs with coped gables. The central block has two storeys and 14 bays with four gables, and the flanking wings are lower with three storeys and seven wings. Most of the windows are segmental-headed tilting casements. The middle windows in the upper floor of the gabled bays have round-arched heads with voussoirs. The other windows in the central block, and the windows on the middle floor of the outer wings have keystones.
Former Carnegie Public Library; 53.74413°N 0.37251°W		1905	The library, later used for other purposes, was designed by J. H. Hirst. It is in brick, with applied timber framing and rendered infill, deep eaves and a gutter on wrought iron scroll brackets, and hipped tile roofs. There is an L-shaped plan with wings of unequal length, and an octagonal porch in the angle, with a pyramidal roof and a weathervane. It contains eight casement windows, with an inscribed panel on one. The main wing to the right has three storeys and four bays, and an open wooden arcade. The shorter bay has a large chimney stack at the end.
Airship Memorial; 53.75143°N 0.37637°W		1924	The memorial in Western Cemetery commemorates those lost an airship disaster in 1921. It is in Portland stone, and consists of a free-standing chest with a cross. On the ends are bronze plaques inscribed with the names of those lost.
Two telephone kiosks 53.74397°N 0.37252°W		1935	The telephone kiosks on Anlaby Road are of the K6 type designed by Giles Gilbert Scott. Constructed in cast iron with a square plan and a dome, they have three unperforated crowns in the top panels.
