= Listed buildings in Reedness =

Reedness is a civil parish in the county of the East Riding of Yorkshire, England. It contains eight listed buildings that are recorded in the National Heritage List for England. All the listed buildings are designated at Grade II, the lowest of the three grades, which is applied to "buildings of national importance and special interest". The parish contains the village of Reedness and the surrounding countryside, and the listed buildings consist of houses, farmhouses and a farm building.

== Buildings ==
Name and location	Photograph	Date	Notes
The Old Manor; 53.69732°N 0.79232°W	—	Early 18th century	The house is in brick, partly rendered and colourwashed, on a moulded plinth, with corbelled brick eaves, and a pantile roof, hipped on the right, and with a stone coped gable and shaped kneeler on the left. There are two storeys and three bays. The original doorway has an architrave and a flat arch, and to the right is an inserted entrance with a segmental arch. The windows are casements with segmental heads.
Elmtree House; 53.69960°N 0.80104°W	—	Mid-18th century	The house is in pebbledashed brick, with a floor band, stepped eaves, and a Welsh slate roof with stone coped gables and shaped kneelers. There are two storeys and an attic, an L-shaped plan, and a front range of three bays. In the centre is a doorway with a fanlight in a panelled reveal, and a modillion pediment on scrolled consoles. The windows are sashes in slightly recessed architraves, with flat arches and keystones.
Reedness Hall; 53.69999°N 0.80111°W		Mid-18th century	The house is in brick on a plinth, with a stepped and cogged brick eaves cornice, and a roof of Welsh slate at the front and pantile at the rear, with stone coped gables and shaped kneelers. There are two storeys and an attic, an approximately square double depth plan, and five bays. The central doorway has a three-light fanlight in a reveal, a plain frieze and a moulded pediment. The windows are slightly recessed sashes in architraves with rubbed brick flat arches.
Reedness Manor House; 53.69682°N 0.78788°W	—	Mid-18th century	The house which was later extended, is in brick, with some reused older material, it is pebbledashed on the front, with sandstone dressings, on a plinth, with a moulded wooden eaves cornice, and a double-span roof in slate and pantile, with stone coped gables and shaped kneelers, and a hipped roof on the extension. There are two storeys, a front of three bays, and rear extensions. In the centre is a porch with panelled square columns and foliate capitals, a plain entablature, a fanlight and a hood. This is flanked by full-height canted bay windows, and above the porch is a sash window.
The Old Parsonage; 53.69642°N 0.78641°W		Mid to late 18th century	A parsonage and school, later a private house, in brick, with a wooden modillion eaves cornice, and a double span pantile roof with stone coped gables and shaped kneelers. There are two storeys and an attic, an L-shaped plan, and a front range of three bays. The central doorway has a three-light fanlight, the windows are casements, and all the openings are under segmental brick arches. On the right return is a French window and sash windows, some horizontally sliding.
The Fernery Farmhouse; 53.69980°N 0.80236°W	—	Late 18th century	The farmhouse is in brick, rendered on the left return, with plain wooden eaves boards, and a Welsh slate roof with stone coped gables and shaped kneelers. There are two storeys, an L-shaped plan, and a front range of three bays. The central doorway has a fanlight, and a cornice and hood on ornate consoles. The windows are sashes in architraves under painted rubbed brick flat arches.
Moorend Farmhouse; 53.66008°N 0.81894°W		Late 18th to early 19th century	The farmhouse is in brick, with stepped eaves, and a pantile roof with brick coped gables. There are two storeys and an attic, a double depth plan, and a front range of three bays In the centre is a latticed porch, and a doorway with pilasters, a fanlight and margin lights. The windows are sashes in architraves with flat stucco arches.
Stable and granary range west of Moorend Farmhouse; 53.66009°N 0.81943°W	—	Late 18th to early 19th century	The range, which was later extended, is in red brick, the extension is in yellow brick, and it has a hipped pantile roof. There are two storeys, each part has three bays, and there is a single-story two-bay extension to the south. The range contains doorways with round-arched head, casement windows with segmental heads, vents, and slatted ventilation hatches.
