= Listed buildings in Gowdall =

Gowdall is a civil parish in the county of the East Riding of Yorkshire, England. It contains three listed buildings that are recorded in the National Heritage List for England. All the listed buildings are designated at Grade II, the lowest of the three grades, which is applied to "buildings of national importance and special interest". The parish contains the village of Gowdall and the surrounding countryside. All the listed buildings are in the countryside to the south of the village, and consist of a farmhouse and farm buildings.

== Buildings ==
Name and location	Photograph	Date	Notes
Stable and pigeoncote, Gowdall Hill Farm; 53.68786°N 1.062196°W		Late 18th century	The buildings are in brown brick, with a dentilled eaves cornice, the pigeoncote has a roof of Yorkshire slate, the stable has a pantile roof, and the roofs have stone coped gables and shaped kneelers. The stable has two low storeys and three bays, and the pigeoncote is taller with two storeys and one bay. On the stable are segmental-arched doorways, both buildings have hatches, and the pigeoncote has a projecting slate shelf and a row of pigeon holes.
Gowdall Broach Farmhouse; 53.68309°N 1.06696°W		Late 18th to early 19th century	The farmhouse is in brown brick, with stepped eaves, and a Yorkshire slate roof with stone coped gables and shaped kneelers. There are two storeys and attics, and three bays. In the centre is a porch, and a doorway with a two-light fanlight under a cambered brick arch. The windows are sashes in architraves, on the ground floor under cambered brick arches, and on the upper floor under segmental arches.
Barn, Gowdall Broach Farmhouse; 53.68321°N 1.06743°W		Late 18th to early 19th century	The threshing barn is in brick, and has a roof of Yorkshire slate and pantile with stone coped gables and shaped kneelers. There are two storeys, a rectangular plan, ten bays, and opposing entrances. On the front are doorways under segmental arches, slit vents and a pitching hatch. The rear has similar openings, and on the south gable end is an owl hole.
