= Listed buildings in Kingston upon Hull (Pickering Ward) =

Pickering Ward is a ward in the city and unitary authority of Kingston upon Hull, East Riding of Yorkshire, England. It contains eight listed buildings that are recorded in the National Heritage List for England. All the listed buildings are designated at Grade II, the lowest of the three grades, which is applied to "buildings of national importance and special interest". The ward is to the west of the centre of the city, and is named after Christopher Pickering, a businessman and philanthropist. Most of the listed buildings in the ward are associated with him, namely almshouses, a former museum and reading room, and the entrance to Pickering Park. The other listed buildings consist of former smokehouses, a sewage pumping station and an old people's home.

== Buildings ==
Name and location	Photograph	Date	Notes
Former smokehouses 53.73028°N 0.38668°W		c. 1890	The two smokehouses are in brick with roofs of slate and corrugated asbestos. On the roof of each is a narrow longitudinal flue surrounded by a catwalk and guard rail, carrying metal cowls with hoods and shaped vanes. Between them are processing sheds and offices.
Gateway, Pickering Park and Pickering Rest Homes; 53.73030°N 0.39957°W		1909	The gateway to the park and the Christopher Pickering Homes was designed by J. H. Hirst. The gates are in cast iron with decoration in wrought iron, the openwork piers surmounted by scrolls. These are flanked at an angle by blocks of six almshouses. These are in brick on a plinth, with stone dressings, quoins, and tile roofs. Each block has one storey and six bays. The middle three bays contain paired doorways, over which is an inscribed panel, a parapet and a central pediment. This is flanked by four-light mullioned windows and loggias with two pointed-arched openings, outside which are four bays, with four-light mullioned windows in gabled bays and doorways.
Sewage pumping station 53.72993°N 0.40051°W	—	c. 1909	The sewage pumping station to the west of the Christopher Pickering Homes is in stone on a chamfered plinth, with quoins, and a tile roof with coped gables and kneelers. The gable end facing the road has a round-arched doorway above which is a roundel containing a lozenge-shaped window. On the roof is a gabled ventilator.
Former museum and reading room 53.72996°N 0.40073°W		1912	The museum and reading room, later used for other purposes, was designed by J. H. Hirst. It is in brick on a plinth, with stone dressings, quoins, a sill band, string courses, buttresses, and a tile roof with coped gables. There is a single storey and six bays. The gable end facing the road has a central portico with a segmental pointed opening flanked by Corinthian granite columns, outside which are large pointed-arched windows. On the roof are dormers, and at the rear is a full-width porch with a hipped roof.
Northeast block, Christopher Pickering Homes; 53.73000°N 0.40142°W		1914	Four almshouses designed by J. H. Hirst, later old peoples' homes, in brick on a plinth, with stone dressings, quoins, and a tile roof. There is one storey and four bays. The middle three bays contain paired doorways, over which is an inscribed panel, a parapet and a central pediment. This is flanked by four-light mullioned windows and loggias with two pointed-arched openings, outside which are four-light mullioned windows in a gabled bay and a doorway.
Northwest block, Christopher Pickering Homes; 53.72989°N 0.40195°W		1914	Four almshouses designed by J. H. Hirst, later old peoples' homes, in brick on a plinth, with stone dressings, quoins, and a tile roof. There is one storey and four bays. The middle three bays contain paired doorways, over which is an inscribed panel, a parapet and a central pediment. This is flanked by four-light mullioned windows and loggias with two pointed-arched openings, outside which are four-light mullioned windows in a gabled bay and a doorway.
Worsley House; 53.72934°N 0.40328°W		1914	A home for orphan girls designed by John Bilson and later used as an old people's home. It is in brick on a plinth, with stone dressings, a floor band and a tile roof. There are two storeys, a C-shaped plan, and eleven bays. The two outer bays at each end project under a dentilled open pediment. The central bay is in stone, it projects slightly, and contains a doorway with a moulded surround and rusticated pilasters, and above is a sash window in an eared and shouldered architrave. The other windows are sashes with slightly segmental heads, and on the return are through-eaves pedimented dormers.
West block, Christopher Pickering Homes; 53.72966°N 0.40222°W		1952	Four almshouses, later old peoples' homes, in brick on a plinth, with stone dressings, quoins, and a tile roof. There is one storey and four bays. The middle three bays contain paired doorways, over which is an inscribed panel, a parapet and a central pediment. This is flanked by four-light mullioned windows and loggias with two pointed-arched openings, outside which are four-light mullioned windows and doorways.
