= Listed buildings in Kingston upon Hull (St Andrew's Ward) =

St Andrew's Ward is a ward in the city and unitary authority of Kingston upon Hull, East Riding of Yorkshire, England. It contains 23 listed buildings that are recorded in the National Heritage List for England. All the listed buildings are designated at Grade II, the lowest of the three grades, which is applied to "buildings of national importance and special interest". The ward is to the west of the centre of the city, and is mainly residential. Most of the listed buildings are houses, and the others include a public house, a hydraulic tower and pump house, churches, schools, some later used for other purposes, a library, a shop, a former bank, memorials and telephone kiosks.

== Buildings ==
| Name and location | Photograph | Date | Notes |
|---|---|---|---|
| 100 and 101 Coltman Street; 53.73728°N 0.35845°W | | c. 1840 | A pair of houses and a former stable, they are in brick, stuccoed on the front, on a plinth, with a moulded sill band, deep eaves and a hipped slate roof. There are two storeys, the houses have six bays, with the single-bay former stable recessed on the left, The middle two bays of the houses are recessed, and contain pairs of Doric columns in antis with doorways behind. The windows are sashes, those on the ground floor with moulded eared architraves and aprons. The former stable contains a doorway with a sash window and a parapet above. |
| 102 and 103 Coltman Street; 53.73703°N 0.35832°W | | c. 1840 | A pair of houses linked by a former stable, the left house later a club and the right house divided into flats. They are in brick, the left house and link painted, on a plinth, with a ground floor sill band, wooden modillion eaves and gutter, and roofs of slate and artificial slate. On the link is a mansard roof. There are two storeys, each house has three bays, and the link has one. The left house has a wooden Doric portico with a frieze and a cornice, and a doorway with a fanlight, and the windows are top-hung casements. On the link is a pair of segment-headed carriage doors, over which is a segment-headed dormer. The doorway of the right house has pilasters, and the windows are sashes. |
| 113 Coltman Street; 53.73734°N 0.35895°W | | c. 1840 | The house is in brick, with painted stone dressings, wooden modillion eaves and gutters, and a hipped slate roof. There are two storeys and three bays. In the centre is a portico with wooden columns and an entablature, and a doorway with a fanlight. The windows are sashes with slightly cambered lintels and keystones. To the right is the wall of a former stable forming a screen wall. It is in brick on a rendered plinth with moulded coping. It contains an elliptical-arched opening with imposts, flanked by slim pilasters that rise above the parapet and have caps, and outside these are round-arched openings. |
| 117 Coltman Street; 53.73773°N 0.35933°W | | c. 1840 | The house is in painted brick, with painted stone dressings, sill bands, dentilled wooden eaves, and a slate roof. There are two storeys and three bays. In the centre is a Doric portico with an entablature, and a doorway with a fanlight. The windows are sashes with slightly cambered lintels and keystones. |
| 179 Coltman Street; 53.74139°N 0.36256°W | | c. 1840 | The house is in brick, stuccoed on the front, on a plinth, with a sill band, modillion wooden eaves, a low coped parapet and a slate roof. There are two storeys and three bays. On the right bay are two Doric columns in antis, and a recessed doorway with a fanlight. The windows are sashes, those on the ground floor with eared surrounds, and there is a box dormer on the roof. |
| 180–186 Coltman Street; 53.74169°N 0.36282°W | | c. 1840 | A terrace of seven houses linked by former stables, they are in brick, stuccoed on the fronts, on rendered plinths, with a moulded sill band, wooden dentilled and modillion eaves, and slate roofs. There are two storeys and 17 bays. The doorways, some of which are paired, have Doric columns in antis under a cornice, in front of doorways with fanlights. Most of the windows are sashes, those on the ground floor with moulded eared architraves. The former stables are slightly recessed, with a doorway on the ground floor, and above is a sash window and a parapet. |
| 114 Coltman Street; 53.73750°N 0.35913°W | | 1853 | The house is in brick, with a stuccoed basement, stone dressings, a plinth band, rebated eaves, and a slate roof. There are two storeys, attics and a basement, and three bays. On the right bay, steps with railings lead up to a porch with Doric columns in antis, and a segmental head with a frieze and a cornice, and a recessed doorway with a fanlight. The windows are sashes with moulded surrounds, those on the ground floor with eared and shouldered surrounds. Enclosing the basement area is a cast iron balustrade. On the left return is a round-headed stair window. |
| 168 Coltman Street; 53.74069°N 0.36193°W | | c. 1854 | The house is in brick on a plinth, with painted stone dressings, a wooden gutter on brackets, and an artificial slate roof. There are two storeys and three bays. On the right bay is a recess with Doric columns in antis, a frieze and a dentilled cornice, and a doorway with a fanlight. The windows are sashes with moulded surrounds, those on the ground floor with eared and shouldered surrounds and dentilled cornices. |
| Criterion Public House; 53.73609°N 0.36131°W | | c. 1860 | The public house, on a corner site, is in yellow brick, with dressings in red brick and stone, polychrome sill bands and window heads, a moulded cornice, and a slate roof. There are three storeys and fronts of four and five bays, and a curved bay on the corner. Extending round the corner is a pub front with panelled pilasters, shaped brackets with segmental pediments, and a moulded cornice, and on the corner is a doorway with a curved fanlight flanked by windows. The other windows are sashes, those on the ground and middle floors with round-arched heads and keystones, and those on the top floor with segmental heads. |
| Hydraulic tower and pump house, St Andrew's Dock; 53.72961°N 0.36436°W | | c. 1870 | The hydraulic tower and pump house are in brick on a plinth, with stone dressings and a slate roof. The tower has two stages, rebated eaves and a flat top, and on the sides are round-headed recesses and windows. The pump house has one storey, rebated eaves and coped gables. On the west side are six bays divided by pilasters, containing blocked round-headed windows, and on the south side is a round window. |
| St Matthew's Church and wall 53.74330°N 0.36672°W | | 1870 | The church is in yellow brick, with banding and dressings red brick and stone, and a slate roof. It consists of a nave with a clerestory, north and south aisles, a northwest porch, a chancel with an apse, a southeast vestry, and a northeast steeple. The steeple has a tower with three stages, a plinth, string courses, lancet windows, double-lancet louvred bell openings, a corbel table, and an octagonal broach spire with a tier of gabled lucarnes, and a tier of small double lancets with oval windows above. Most of the windows on the body of the church are lancets, and on the apse are three triple lancets. Outside, to the north, is a low brick boundary wall with stone coping, and a concave curve to the northwest porch. |
| St John the Baptist's Church; 53.73720°N 0.37241°W | | 1876 | The church is in red brick, with dressings in moulded brick and stone, and a slate roof. It consists of a nave with a clerestory, north and south aisles, a west porch, a chancel, and a west vestry. The clerestory windows are round with cinquefoils, and most of the other windows are lancets. On the west end is an octagonal wooden bell turret with a conical roof and a weathervane. |
| Former City Temple; 53.73638°N 0.35819°W | | 1879 | The church, later used for other purposes, is in yellow brick, with dressings in stone and granite, and slate roofs. At the west end is a central gable flanked by projecting square towers. In the middle is a doorway with granite columns, and a pediment containing two round-arched lights, flanked by round-arched windows with hood moulds. Above it is a wheel window in a decorated round-arched recess, below which is an inscription, and above which is a small stepped round-headed triple lancet window. The towers have three stages, plinths, string courses, angle buttresses, corbel tables and cornices. Each tower has a pedimented doorway, above which are paired windows with hood moulds. At the top is a short recessed spire. Along the sides are five bays separated by pilasters, and two storeys, each bay with two round-headed windows and hood moulds on each storey. |
| Adult Education Centre and railings 53.73665°N 0.37369°W | | 1881 | A board school, later used for other purposes, in red brick, with dressings in blue brick and stone, and slate roofs with coped gables. There is a single storey and 19 bays. Most windows have mullions and transoms. The central bay is a projecting porch containing a doorway with a pointed head, an inscribed tympanum and hood mould, and above is a shouldered gabled bell turret. Elsewhere, there are three larger gabled bays, and three smaller gabled bays, one with a pointed doorway. On the roof are square louvred ventilators, and small louvred dormers with gablets. Along the front of the school are railings with fleur-de-lys heads on a chamfered brick plinth containing brick piers with pyramidal caps. |
| Newington primary and nursery schools 53.73501°N 0.37739°W | | 1885 | The schools, designed by William Botterill, are in brick on a plinth, with dressings in terracotta and stone, a sill band, moulded brick eaves, and slate roofs with shaped coped gables. They have a single storey, and the windows are sashes and casements with segmental heads, some with keystones. The primary school on the right has a central block flanked by wings and pavilions. The central block has three bays, and contains windows divided by pilasters, rising to a cornice, terracotta relief panels, and a shouldered shaped gable containing a dated panel. On the roofs of the central block and the pavilions are wooden bell turrets with ogee lead roofs and finials. The nursery school has a main range at right angles to the street, and two rear wings. The main range has a shouldered shaped gable with a pediment containing a relief panel, and on the roof is a bell turret. |
| Western Branch Library; 53.73610°N 0.36398°W | | 1894 | The library is in brick on a plinth, with stone dressings, sill bands, string courses, a wavy-topped moulded parapet, and a slate roof with coped gables. There are two storeys and seven bays. The middle bay projects as a tower porch, and is flanked by octagonal buttresses with domed turrets. It contains an entrance with double pilasters and an open pediment on brackets, and a round-arched doorway with a fanlight. Above is a canted bay window with a pediment and an ogee lead roof, and a shaped gable with a triangular pediment containing a louvred round opening. The middle of the outer bays is slightly projecting under an ornamented pediment, over which is an arched moulded parapet and a finial, and these bays contain sash windows. |
| Former Public Benefit Shoe Company shop 53.73681°N 0.35803°W | | 1896 | The shop on a corner site is in brick, with dressings in stone and granite, string courses, a moulded sill band, and slate roofs. There are three storeys and attics, and fronts of six and nine bays. The ground floor contains a shopfront with a doorway angled on the corner. Above the doorway is an octagonal corner tower with a rounded lower stage. Over this is a clock flanked by a coat of arms, and an elaborate strapwork frieze that extends along the front to the right. The next stage contains three small windows, and above is a cupola with round-arched windows and Tuscan columns, and an octagonal spire with a domed turret. The windows are sashes, and on the top floor most are recessed with Tuscan columns between. Each front has a shaped coped gable with a segmental pediment containing a round window, and a finial, flanked by octagonal buttresses with turrets. |
| Former Yorkshire Bank; 53.73503°N 0.36466°W | | 1901 | The former bank on a corner site is in brick on a plinth, with faience tiles on the ground floor, terracotta dressings, a ground floor cornice, string courses, and a Westmorland slate roof with coped gables. There are three storeys and attics, and fronts of four bays, with a canted bay on the corner. The entrance on the corner has a segmental arch and is flanked by octagonal piers with finials in the form of heraldic beasts. The doorway has a segmental-headed mullioned fanlight, over which is a relief panel with a dated scroll. Above this is a two-light window, a three-light window flanked by octagonal pilasters with ball finials, and a gabled dormer with a window over a cartouche. Behind and above is a steep pyramidal roof with a wrought iron crest. The ground floor contains three-light segmental-headed cross-casement windows over which is a cornice with heraldic beasts. The upper floors have groups of sash windows, and octagonal pilasters with ball finials, above which are coped ramped parapets with segmental pediments. |
| Fishermen's Memorial; 53.73539°N 0.36304°W | | 1906 | The memorial commemorates those lost in the Dogger Bank incident. It consists of a life-size figure of a fisherman in Portland stone, standing on a square pink granite pedestal with a plinth, and a cornice on a stepped stone base. On the front of the pedestal is an inscription. |
| The Boulevard Centre; 53.73797°N 0.36550°W | | 1914 | Built as a school for fishermen, later used for other purposes, it was designed by J. H. Hirst. It is in red brick, on a plinth with stone coping, with stone dressings, quoins, a floor band, a moulded eaves cornice, a deep parapet and a slate roof. There are two storeys and seven bays, the middle three bays projecting. In the centre is a doorway with a stone surround, and an inscribed plaque on a bracketed hood. Above it is a large staircase window above which the cornice forms a semicircular pediment containing a circular window in a carved stone surround. The flanking bays contain tall windows with round heads and keystones. On the outer bays are windows, those on the upper floor with aprons. |
| War Memorial Street Shrine; 53.73506°N 0.36443°W | | 1916 | The street shrine is attached to the wall of a shop in Eton Street. It consists of a white marble plaque divided into three panels by metal bands with fleur-de-lys finials and carved flowers in the corners. Flanking the outer panels are inset blue-grey decorated granite columns. The panels contain the names of those lost in the First World War, including servicemen and fishermen. Under the panels is a moulded inscribed base on two moulded corbel brackets. Above the shrine is a replaced decorative pediment. |
| K6 Telephone kiosk 53.73677°N 0.35811°W | | c. 1930 | The telephone kiosk on Hessle Road corner is of the K6 type designed by Giles Gilbert Scott. Constructed in cast iron, it is a square domed kiosk with illuminated top panels and margin glazing to the sides and the door. |
| K8 Telephone kiosk 53.73521°N 0.36303°W | | From 1968 | The telephone kiosk on Boulevard is of the K8 type designed by Bruce Martin. It is in cast iron with an aluminium door, It has a square plan and is painted cream. There is a flat domed roof, under which are rectangular panels with rounded corners containing "TELEPHONE". |
