= Listed buildings in Kingston upon Hull (Southcoates West Ward) =

Southcoates West Ward is a ward in the city and unitary authority of Kingston upon Hull, East Riding of Yorkshire, England. It contains two listed buildings that are recorded in the National Heritage List for England. Both the listed buildings are designated at Grade II, the lowest of the three grades, which is applied to "buildings of national importance and special interest". The ward is in Southcoates, an area to the east of the centre of the city, it is largely residential, and the listed buildings consist of a public house and a restored windmill.

== Buildings ==
Name and location	Photograph	Date	Notes
The Mill Public House; 53.76240°N 0.29768°W		c. 1820	Two houses and a storehouse, later combined into a public house, it is in brick with pantile roofs. There are two storeys, four bays, and an L-shaped plan. The gable end facing the road contains a former shop window with a reeded surround and a cornice, around a casement window and a doorway. Along the right return are two canted bay windows, a sash window and a doorway, and on the upper floor are sash windows with segmental yellow brick heads. The right wing contains double doors with pilasters and a cornice, and sash windows.
Windmill; 53.76225°N 0.29778°W		c. 1820	The restored former windmill is in rendered brick with stone dressings, and consists of a tapering round tower with five stages. On the ground floor is a pair of board doors, above which is a pair of smaller segmental-headed doors, and over these is a casement window on each stage. On the top is a cap, four sails, and a fantail.
