= Listed buildings in Kingston upon Hull (Holderness Ward) =

Holderness Ward is a ward in the city and unitary authority of Kingston upon Hull, East Riding of Yorkshire, England. It contains two listed buildings that are recorded in the National Heritage List for England. Both the listed buildings are designated at Grade II, the lowest of the three grades, which is applied to "buildings of national importance and special interest". The ward is a residential area to the northeast of the city centre, and the listed buildings consist of a group of former almshouses and a water chute.

== Buildings ==
Name and location	Photograph	Date	Notes
Ferens' Havens and boundary walls 53.76399°N 0.29608°W		1911	A group of almshouses, later old people's homes, in brick on a plinth, with dressings in brick and stone, and tile roofs. They have a single storey and form a C-shaped plan on three sides of a sunken garden, with ranges of twelve and six bays. In the centre of the main range is a gabled entrance conning a round-arch with a moulded surround, and an inscribed datestone above. The houses contain mullioned windows, doorways with segmental-arched heads, and gabled dormers. In front of the houses is a terrace, and a retaining wall with a pierced balustrade, and at the inner angle are steps with square piers and ball finials. The boundary wall is in brick with chamfered balusters and stone coping, and square piers with ball finials.
Water chute, East Park; 53.76568°N 0.30029°W		1929	The water chute in the boating lake has a rectangular brick tower, with buttresses and a hipped tile roof. At the rear are double doors, the upper floor has open sides and timber grills, and there is an external iron staircase. The iron chute extends from the tower to the lake and is carried on tubular iron supports.
