= Listed buildings in Kingston upon Hull (Boothferry Ward) =

Boothferry Ward is a ward in the city and unitary authority of Kingston upon Hull, East Riding of Yorkshire, England. It contains five listed buildings that are recorded in the National Heritage List for England. All the listed buildings are designated at Grade II, the lowest of the three grades, which is applied to "buildings of national importance and special interest". The ward is a residential area to the west of the centre of the city, and the listed buildings consist of a group of former almshouses and associated structures.

== Buildings ==
| Name and location | Photograph | Date | Notes |
|---|---|---|---|
| Memorial, Lee's Rest Houses; 53.74424°N 0.40177°W | | c. 1912 | The memorial in the entrance court is in stone, and it consists of a tapering square column with a concave-sided pediment. It has a bulbous square pedestal with a plinth and a cornice, on two steps, and on it stands the statue of a robed figure with an inscribed tablet below. |
| Lee's Rest Houses; 53.74403°N 0.40175°W | | 1912–15 | A group of almshouses, later used for other purposes, in brick, with stone dressings, a plinth, angle pilasters, dentilled wooden eaves and hipped tile roofs. The entrance court at the north, consists of a central block and two residence blocks at right angles. Along each side are five linked residence blocks, and at the south end is a library block and two residence blocks. The entrance block has two storeys and eleven bays. In the centre is an Ionic portico, with pilasters, a round-arched carriage entrance with a double keystone, and a pediment with a cartouche in the tympanum. The associated residence blocks have two storeys and ten bays, the blocks along the sides each have nine bays, and between these are open shelters with gabled roofs. The library block has a single storey, a gabled roof with a domed lantern and a weathervane, and an embattled parapet. |
| Garden shelter, Lee's Rest Houses; 53.74352°N 0.40169°W | | 1912–15 | The shelter in the centre of the garden has an octagonal plan, it is on a stone base, and has seats around the centre. Outside there are eight round wooden posts carrying an octagonal conical tile roof, containing four small gablets. This is surmounted by a round dovecote with a separate conical roof. |
| Gateway and walls, Lee's Rest Houses; 53.74439°N 0.40177°W | | 1912–15 | The gate piers flanking the entrance to the grounds are in brick with a square plan, and each carries a stone vase supported by volutes. The gates are in wrought iron, and the flanking concave walls are in brick on a plinth, with slab coping. They end in piers with pyramidal caps, and in the right wall is a small gateway. |
| Former laundry, Lee's Rest Houses; 53.74278°N 0.40160°W | | 1912–15 | The former laundry is in red brick with hipped tile roofs. There is a single storey and attics, and seven bays, and flanking lower wings. On the ground floor are two-light casement windows, and above are four box dormers. The wings contain round-arched doorways. |
