= Listed buildings in Kingston upon Hull (Sutton Ward) =

Sutton Ward is a ward in the city and unitary authority of Kingston upon Hull, East Riding of Yorkshire, England. It contains nine listed buildings that are recorded in the National Heritage List for England. Of these, one is listed at Grade I, the highest of the three grades, and the others are at Grade II, the lowest grade. The ward is to the northeast of the city centre, and contains Sutton-on-Hull, originally a village, and later a suburb of the city. The most important listed building in the ward is a church, most of the others are houses and associated structures, and the rest consist of two former almshouses, and a school converted into a museum.

== Key ==
Grade	Criteria
I	Buildings of exceptional interest, sometimes considered to be internationally important
II	Buildings of national importance and special interest

== Buildings ==
Name and location	Photograph	Date	Notes	Grade
St James' Church and wall 53.78092°N 0.30467°W		c. 1347	The church has been altered and extended through the centuries, including a restoration in 1866–67 and additions in 1883. It is built in brick with stone dressings and in stone, with slate roofs. The church consists of a nave, north and south aisles, a chancel with a vestry and organ chamber, and a west tower embraced by the aisles. The tower is in brick, with two stages, a moulded plinth, quoins, angle buttresses, string courses, and an embattled parapet with crocketed corner pinnacles. It contains a west doorway with a moulded surround, a pointed arch and a hood mould, above which is a five-light windows with a hood mould, and a small loop, to the south is a clock face, and the bell openings are double lancets with louvres. The south wall of the nave and the south aisle also have embattled parapets. To the south is a low brick boundary wall with stone coping and railings.	I
Victoria Cottage; 53.77834°N 0.30347°W		Mid to late 17th century	The house is in colourwashed brick, with a pantile roof, catslide at the rear. There is a single storey with attics, and four bays. On the right is a gabled porch containing a round-arched opening, and a casement window on the left side. To the left is a small ventilator, and horizontally-sliding sash windows.	II
Jessamine Cottage; 53.77841°N 0.30261°W		c. 1770	The house, which has been extended to the left, is in whitewashed brick, with pantile roofs, and a coped gable on the left. There is a single storey and attics, and four bays. The main block contains a 20th-century window and a two-light casement to the right, and two gabled roof dormers. The extension to the left has a segmental-headed doorway and segment-headed casements, and on the left return is a bow window.	II
96 and 98 Church Street; 53.77980°N 0.30218°W		c. 1770	A house, later a shop, in brick on a plinth, with painted stone dressings, and a pantile roof with coped gables. There are three storeys and four bays, with the gable end facing the street, and two two-storey rear wings. On the front is a doorway with a pediment flanked by canted bay windows. The other windows are sashes, with splayed lintels on the lower two floors, and with segmental heads on the top floor.	II
27, 28 and 29 Lowgate; 53.77840°N 0.30381°W		c. 1800	A row of three, later two, houses in rendered and whitewashed brick, with a wooden gutter and brackets, and a pantile roof. There are two storeys and attics, and six bays. On the front are three doorways with fanlights and pediments. The windows are sashes, and on the gable end are horizontally sliding sash windows.	II
Ann Watson College, wall and railings 53.77987°N 0.30430°W		c. 1800	A row of almshouses on a curving corner site in yellow brick, with stone dressings and a slate roof. There are two storeys and 18 bays, including curved bays on the corner. On the front is a doorway with a round-arched opening, a keystone, pilasters and a cornice, above it is an inscribed plaque, and on the corner is a round-headed doorway with a fanlight and a keystone. Most of the windows are sashes, some with cornices. Outside is a brick boundary wall with ramped stone coping, railings and two gates.	II
Chamberlain Almshouses; 53.78027°N 0.30463°W		1800	The almshouses, later two private houses, are in red brick, with stone dressings, deep wooden modillion eaves and a hipped slate roof. There are two storeys and three bays, the middle bay projecting under a pediment containing an oval inscribed and dated cartouche. On the front are two doorways with blocked fanlights, and sash windows, paired on the middle bay, all under painted flat brick arches.	II
Greenacre and wall 53.77959°N 0.29991°W		c. 1810	The house is in yellow brick on a plinth, with stone dressings, a floor band, a wooden gutter and brackets, and a hipped slate roof. There are two storeys and three bays. To the left is a single-storey porch with a parapet, containing a door with a fanlight flanked by Roman Doric columns. The windows are sashes with painted flat brick arches. The boundary wall has ramped slab coping, and it contains two square brick gate piers with slab caps, and two wrought iron gates.	II
The Old School; 53.78175°N 0.30613°W		1859	The school was later extended, and subsequently converted into a museum. It is in red brick, mainly on a plinth, with a slate roof. It consists of a main block with three wings to the south. The porch, in an angle, has a doorway with a segmental-pointed arch, and a small side window.	II
