= Listed buildings in Kingston upon Hull (Bricknell Ward) =

Bricknell Ward is a ward in the city and unitary authority of Kingston upon Hull, East Riding of Yorkshire, England. It contains five listed buildings that are recorded in the National Heritage List for England. All the listed buildings are designated at Grade II, the lowest of the three grades, which is applied to "buildings of national importance and special interest". The ward is a residential area to the northwest of the city centre. The listed buildings consist of buildings of the University of Hull, and a chapel and two war memorials in Hull Northern Cemetery.

== Buildings ==
Name and location	Photograph	Date	Notes
Esk Building and Nidd Building; University of Hull; 53.76994°N 0.37101°W		1909–13	Buildings of the college of education, later used by the university, in brick and stone, with stone dressings and slate hipped and mansard roofs. They consist of a central block with flanking wings and projecting end pavilions. The main block has a central bay with four storeys and flanking three-storey wings. It has quoins, a sill band and swept parapets. The doorway has pilasters and a swan-neck pediment embracing a mullioned window, and it is flanked by canted bay windows. Above is a large mullioned and transomed window, a chequerboard panel, and a Diocletian window with a keystone. The wings contain sash windows and attic dormers.
Swale House and wall, University of Hull; 53.76953°N 0.37114°W		1909–13	A college of education, later an office for the university, it is in red brick with modillion wooden eaves and a hipped tile roof. There are two storeys and attics, and three bays. In the centre is a doorway with pilasters and a segmental hood on shaped brackets, flanked by canted bay windows with parapets. The upper floor contains casement windows, and there are three hipped roof dormers. The entrance is flanked by square brick gate piers with flat stone caps, and brick walls with stone coping, the wall to the right, with intermediate piers, extending for about 100 metres (330 ft). At the right end is a gateway with concave walls and square piers.
Chapel, Northern Cemetery; 53.76694°N 0.37530°W		1912	The cemetery chapel, designed by Joseph Hirst, is in red brick with stone dressings, and roofs in slate and asphalt. The main block has polychrome bands, quoins, an eaves band, dentilled eaves, and gables with open pediments. On the front, the central feature has a window flanked by pilasters, a broken segmental pediment, and an elongated keystone. Along the sides are three round-headed windows with keystones. The front has a projecting porch with a doorway flanked by paired Doric columns, and a large broken pediment framing a moulded panel with a cross.
War memorial cross, Northern Cemetery; 53.76702°N 0.37568°W		c. 1920	The cross is in Portland stone. It has a tapering octagonal shaft on which is a bronze sword. This stands on an octagonal pedestal with a plinth, on an octagonal base with a cornice and a single step.
Citizens' war memorial, Northern Cemetery; 53.76640°N 0.37570°W		1951	The war memorial commemorates the citizens of the city who were killed in air raids during the Second World War. It is in Portland stone and sandstone, and consists of a slightly tapered square framed panel with an inscription in raised bronze lettering, flanked by a low segmental wall with bronze lamps. Outside the panel are semicircular coped walls, and in the enclosure are shaped steps.
