= Listed buildings in Kingston upon Hull (Ings Ward) =

Ings Ward is a ward in the city and unitary authority of Kingston upon Hull, East Riding of Yorkshire, England. It contains three listed buildings that are recorded in the National Heritage List for England. All the listed buildings are designated at Grade II, the lowest of the three grades, which is applied to "buildings of national importance and special interest". The ward is a residential area to the northwest of the city centre, and includes the suburb of Sutton-on-Hull. The listed buildings consist of two houses and a church.

== Buildings ==
Name and location	Photograph	Date	Notes
Sutton House; 53.77788°N 0.30147°W		Late 18th century	The house, later divided into flats, is in painted brick on a plinth, with a floor band, dentilled eaves, and a hipped slate roof. There are three storeys and five bays, the middle three bays projecting slightly under a dentilled pediment. In the centre is a portico with Doric columns and pilasters, and above it is a canted bay window with a cornice. The windows are sashes with flat brick arches.
Sutton Grange; 53.77756°N 0.29264°W		c. 1815	The house, later used for other purposes, is in yellow brick on a plinth, with stone dressings, sill bands, dentilled eaves, a cornice, a blocking course, and a hipped Westmorland slate roof. There are two storeys and a basement, three bays in the front and five on the sides, and a lower two-storey bay on the left. The main front has giant corner Doric pilasters, and the middle bay projects slightly. Steps lead up to a tetrastyle Greek Doric portico with a full entablature and a doorway with a fanlight. The outer bays contain round-arches with a fluted tympanum and a sash window, and the upper floor windows are sashes with splayed lintels.
Kingston Wesleyan Methodist Church; 53.76735°N 0.28437°W		1913	The church is in brick on a plinth, with stone dressings, a modillion eaves cornice, a coped balustrade with pedestals, and hipped tile roofs. There are two storeys with seven bays on the front, and a rear wing of seven bays. On the front, the middle bay is wider, and projects under a dentilled pediment. It contains a doorway with a cornice, above which is a panel. Over this is a round-arched window in an arch with a keystone and imposts, above which is a datestone with a Baroque surround. The outer bays contain flat-headed sash windows with keystones. The rear wing has a string course, and at the rear is a later porch.
