= Listed buildings in Kingston upon Hull (Beverley Ward) =

Beverley Ward is a ward in the city and unitary authority of Kingston upon Hull, East Riding of Yorkshire, England. It contains five listed buildings that are recorded in the National Heritage List for England. Of these, one is listed at Grade II*, the middle of the three grades, and the others are at Grade II, the lowest grade. The ward is a residential area to the north of the centre of the city. The listed buildings consist of a country house and associated structures, a church and a vicarage.

== Key ==
Grade	Criteria
II*	Particularly important buildings of more than special interest
II	Buildings of national importance and special interest

== Buildings ==
Name and location	Photograph	Date	Notes	Grade
Stirrup table 53.78689°N 0.35009°W	—	Mid-18th century	The stirrup table is in the centre of a lawn to the west of Haworth Hall. It is in stone, about 1 metre (3 ft 3 in) in height and 1.5 metres (4 ft 11 in) across. The table has a moulded octagonal top, a bulbous octagonal stem, and a moulded square base.	II
Haworth Hall, outbuildings, wall and summerhouse 53.78699°N 0.34978°W		c. 1765–68	The country house is in brick, partly rendered, with a front of stone, the ground floor rusticated, a string course, a dentilled eaves cornice, and roofs in slate and pantile. The main block has three storeys and five bays, In the centre is a portal with two Ionic columns, an entablature and a segmental pediment, and a doorway with a fanlight. The windows are sashes with moulded surrounds, some with keystones. On the south front is a three-storey canted bay window, and on the north front is a recessed bay with a Venetian window and a Diocletian window above. To the left is a wing and a workshop, and a cottage, now an outbuilding. To the north is a summerhouse set in a garden wall, containing gateways and partly with railings.	II*
Haworth Lodge; 53.785739°N 0.36102°W		c. 1830	A lodge to Haworth Hall, later a private house, it is in colourwashed roughcast brick, and has a Westmorland slate roof with gables, traceried bargeboards and finials. There are two storeys and three bays. The north front has a doorway, and the north and west fronts have a cross-casement window on the ground floor and double lancets above.	II
St John's Church, Newland; 53.76889°N 0.35260°W		1833	The church, which has since been enlarged, is built in yellow brick, with stone dressings and slate roofs. It consists of a nave with a west porch and baptistry, a north aisle, a chancel, a Lady chapel and vestries. At the southeast corner is an octagonal bell turret, and the bell stage has buttresses, slits, and an ogee dome.	II
St John's Vicarage; 53.76869°N 0.35193°W		1862	The vicarage is in yellow brick on a plinth, with stone dressings, a floor band, and a hipped slate roof. There are two storeys and three bays. In the centre is a doorway with pilasters, a panelled recess, a fanlight, and a flat stone hood. To the right is a canted bay window. The other windows on the front are sashes with segmental heads, and on the right return are two canted bay windows.	II
