= Listed buildings in Kingston upon Hull (Marfleet Ward) =

Marfleet Ward is a ward in the city and unitary authority of Kingston upon Hull, East Riding of Yorkshire, England. It contains eight listed buildings that are recorded in the National Heritage List for England. Of these, one is listed at Grade II*, the middle of the three grades, and the others are at Grade II, the lowest grade. The ward is an area to the east of the centre of the city, and includes Alexandra Dock and the Eastern Cemetery. The listed buildings include structures associated with the dock and the cemetery, and also a church and associated structures, and a bridge and sluices.

== Key ==
Grade	Criteria
II*	Particularly important buildings of more than special interest
II	Buildings of national importance and special interest

== Buildings ==
Name and location	Photograph	Date	Notes	Grade
Sluices and Bridge over Holderness Drain; 53.74756°N 0.28639°W		1839	The bridge is in brick with stone dressings. There are two spans with stone lining, and between them is a stone pier. The bridge has brick parapets with a dentilled band and stone copings. On the north side are two niches, and the walls curve out at each end to form a splayed opening. On the south side are wooden sluice gates.	II
Churchyard wall and gate, St Giles' Church; 53.74935°N 0.26775°W		1869	At the entrance to the churchyard is a gateway flanked by octagonal piers with conical caps, and there are wooden gates. The churchyard wall is in stone, partly rendered. At the west end, flanking the entrance, it is splayed and has chamfered coping and crenelations, and short lengths of railings.	II
Hydraulic engine house and tower Alexandra Dock; 53.74718°N 0.29297°W		1880–85	The hydraulic engine house and tower are in red brick on a chamfered stone plinth, with rusticated quoins, a moulded eaves band and slate roofs. On the left is a single-bay block with a hipped roof and a ventilator lantern, to its right is a three-bay block with a large round-headed window, a pyramidal roof and a ventilator lantern, then a wide three-bay block, and a single-bay with a round-headed doorway, a hipped roof and a ventilator lantern. At the northwest corner is a four-storey tower with round-arched openings.	II
Pumping engine house Alexandra Dock; 53.74627°N 0.29178°W		1880–85	The pumping engine house is in red brick on a chamfered stone plinth, with rusticated quoins, a moulded eaves band and a slate roof with a ventilator. There is a single storey, a rectangular plan and fronts of nine and three bays. Along the sides are doorways and windows, all round-headed, and some blocked. On the south front they are defined by pilaster strips.	II
Walls, lock gates, graving docks and extension dock, Alexandra Dock; 53.74459°N 0.29684°W		1880–85	The dock was designed by James Abernethy, and it was extended to the east in 1899. The walls are in stone and concrete, the tops with rounded coping. It has a rectangular plan, and a lock entrance on the south side with three sets of lock gates. To the east, three jetties extend northwards, on the north side are two graving docks, and on the west side is a single jetty.	II
St Giles' Church; 53.74937°N 0.26738°W		1884	The church is in rock-aced stone with stone dressings and a slate roof, and is in Early English style. It consists of a nave, a chancel and a north vestry. On the west end is a cross-gabled bell turret surmounted by a cross, and the windows are lancets.	II
100 ton steam crane, Alexandra Dock; 53.74520°N 0.29119°W		1886	The steam crane has a square stone base, and steps on the east side with a wrought iron handrail and balustrade. On it is a triangular steel cabin on a roller track, with two doorways and a glazed cab at the front. Above is a jib with double tubular booms and strutted stays, and at the rear is a square boiler enclosure with a rounded end, a segmental roof and a tubular flue. The structures inside the crane are in iron.	II*
Chapel complex, Eastern Cemetery; 53.75818°N 0.26355°W		1931	The chapel complex is in red brick with banding in limestone. It has a butterfly plan, with two chapels diverging northwards on either side of a trapezoidal cloister. On the north side is an office block, and the entrances are on the south side. The chapels each consists of a nave lit by clerestory windows, and between them is a mortuary. The three entrances on the south side are flanked by Tuscan columns, each entrance has a round brick arch, and the windows have similar arches.	II
