= John Henry Hirst =

English architect (1826–1882)

John Henry Hirst F.R.I.B.A.
- Born: 29 April 1826; Heckmondwike, West Riding of Yorkshire, England
- Died: 6 July 1882 (aged 56); Westbury-on-Trym, Barton Regis, Gloucestershire, England
- Occupation: Architect
- Years active: 1851–1882
- Buildings: St Peter's Church, Harrogate

John Henry Hirst (29 April 1826 – 6 July 1882) was an English architect who designed civic, commercial and domestic buildings, mainly in Bristol and Harrogate. He is known in Harrogate for the designs which he created for the developer George Dawson, including large Neoclassical buildings, and the Gothic Revival St Peter's Church. Several of those designs, such as Prospect Crescent, Cambridge Crescent, and St Peter's Church, are now listed buildings. He is known in his home town, Bristol, for various projects, notably the Neoclassical Stoke Road Drinking Fountain, which is also a listed building.

Hirst died unexpectedly at home in Bristol in circumstances which first appeared unclear, but the inquest found that he had fallen downstairs at some point in the night or early morning and broken his neck.

== Background ==
Hirst was born into a Yorkshire agricultural family. His paternal grandfather was Henry Hirst of Heckmondwike, West Riding of Yorkshire, who is buried in Westgate Congregational Chapelyard of that town. (Note: Henry Hirst (1774 – 13 May 1810). There is a history of Henry Hirst's burial place here) His father was Thomas Hirst who was a merchant, and then, from at least 1841, a farmer of Oakwood House, Wakefield. (Note: Thomas Hirst (12 May 1797 – October 1842). GRO index: Deaths Dec 1842 Hirst William Huddersfield 22 188.) His mother was Hannah Hirst née Oates. (Note: Hannah Hirst née Oates (1804–1849), GRO index: Deaths Dec 1849 Hirst Hannah Wakefield 22 548.) Thomas and Hannah were married on 20 September 1824 at St Peter's Church, Birstall. They were both literate, having signed the marriage register. Hirst, the eldest of four male siblings, was born on 29 April 1826, in Heckmondwike. (Note: John Henry Hirst (10 April 1826 – 6 July 1882). GRO index:Deaths Sep 1882 Hirst John Henry 56 Barton R. 6a 82a.) In 1841, Hirst was living with his parents and two brothers in Newton Lane End, Stanley, Wakefield, West Riding of Yorkshire. By 1851 he was describing himself as an architect in practice, and living at 9 Blenheim Square, Bristol, where he employed a housekeeper.

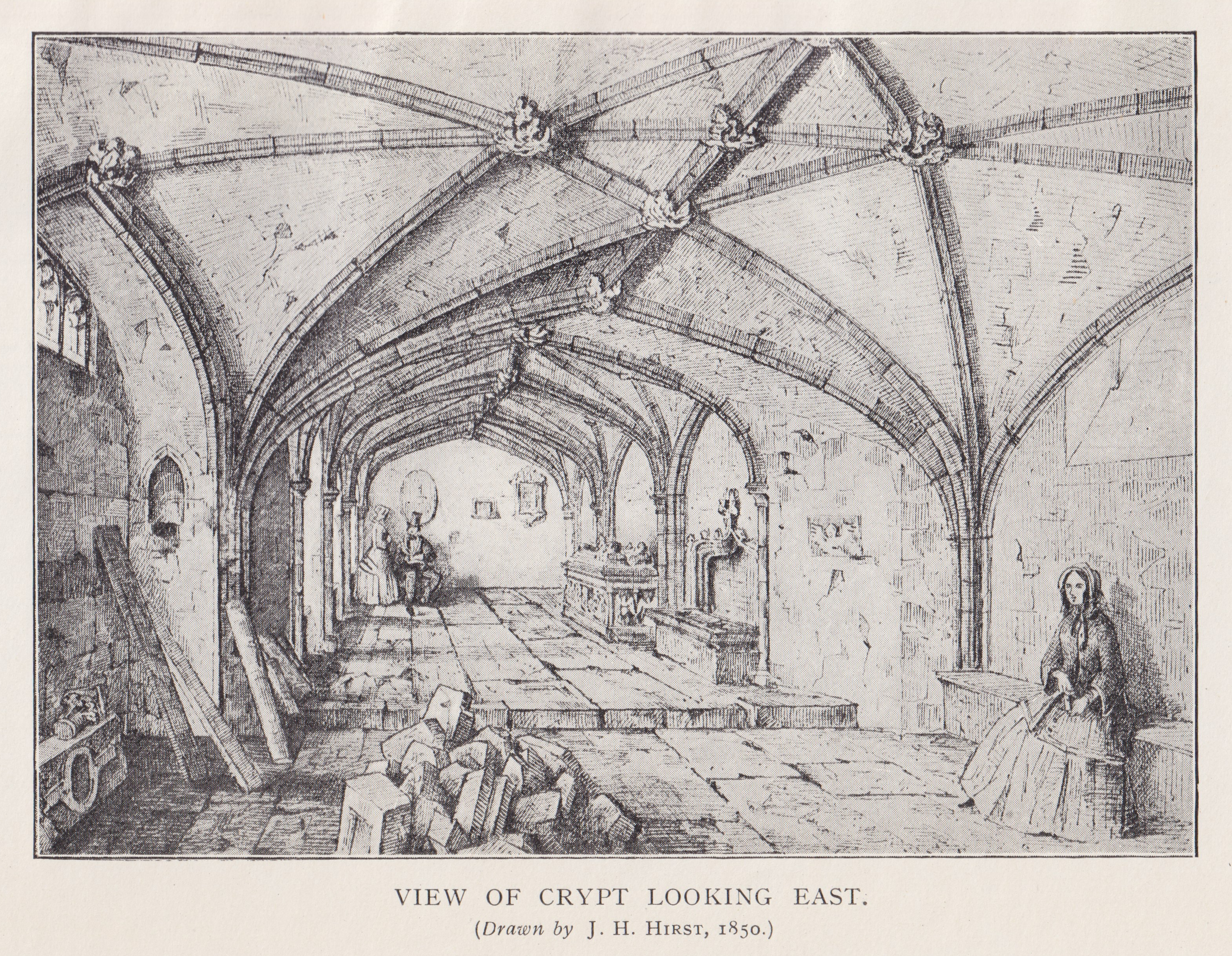
Early architectural illustration by Hirst: St John the Baptist crypt, Bristol, 1850

At Christ Church, Clifton Down, Bristol, on 29 April 1856 Hirst married Harriet Jane Wyld, (Note: Harriet Jane Hirst née Wyld (2 April 1835 – 9 September 1911). GRO index: Marriages Jun 1856 Hirst John Henry and Wyld Harriet Jane, Clifton 6a 201. Deaths Sep 1911 Hirst Harriet J. 76 St.Albans 3a 923.) daughter of William Hopton Wyld of Clifton, Bristol. (Note: William Hopton Wyld (died 1853). GRO index: Deaths Sep 1853 Wyld William Hopton Clifton 6a 47.) The officiating priest was Rev. W. Battersby, Hirst's uncle. Hirst was then living at Brighton Park, Clifton. The Building News noted their large family; they had ten children, the first and last of whom died in infancy. They were Edward Battersby, (Note: Edward Battersby Hirst (1857–1858). GRO index: Births Sep 1857 Hirst Edward Battersby Clifton 6a 55. Deaths Jun 1858 Hirst Edward Battersby Clifton 6a 57.) architect Henry Cecil Montague F.R.I.B.A, (Note: Henry Cecil Montague Hirst (1860 – 25 April 1931). GRO index: Births Jun 1860 Hirst Henry Cecil Montague Clifton 6a 62. Deaths Jun 1931 Hirst Henry C.M. 71 Bristol 6a 222. H.C.M. Hirst designed the Church of St Thomas the Apostle in Eastville, Bristol (1889), now a Pentecostal hall.) Ethel Maude, (Note: Ethel Maude Hirst (born 1861). GRO index: Births Sep 1861 Hirst Ethel Maude Clifton 6a 68.) Mildred Venables, (Note: Mildred Venables Hirst (born 1863). GRO index: Births Dec 1863 Hirst Mildred Venables Clifton 6a 142.) Leila Mary, (Note: Leila Mary Hirst (1866–1921).) Bertram Fawcett, (Note: Bertram Fawcett Hirst (18 July 1867 – January 1920). GRO index: Births Sep 1867 Hirst Bertram Fawcett Clifton 6a 152. Died in January 1920, in County Down, Ireland.) Reginald Arthur, (Note: Reginald Arthur Hirst (8 October 1868 – 1954). GRO index: Births Dec 1868 Hirst Reginald Arthur Clifton 6a 161.) Florence Charlesworth, (Note: Florence Charlesworth Hirst (1870–1949). GRO index: Births Sep 1870 Hirst Florence Charlesworth Clifton 6a 157.) Harriet Winifred, (Note: Harriet Winifred Hirst (1872–1955). GRO index: Births Mar 1872 Hirst Harriet Winifred. Clifton 6a 172.) and Edith Carter. (Note: Edith Carter Hirst (1874 – 25 July 1874). GRO index: Births Sep 1874 Hirst Edith Carter Clifton 6a 168. Deaths Sep 1874 Hirst Edith Carter 0 Clifton 6a 94.) Hirst and his wife employed a governess for their children. By 1861 Hirst and his wife were living at 1 Brighton Park, Clifton, Bristol, with their first child Edward B. Hirst, a relative, and two servants. In 1871 the family was living at Avonhirst, Westbury on Trym with six of their children and two servants. Hirst had designed the house with a lodge for their gardener. The family was still at Avonhirst in 1881, where the census finds Hirst with his wife, six of their children, two visitors and three servants.

== Career ==
Hirst kept an office in Harrogate. Although he retained the Harrogate office to deal with work for his client George Dawson, he was based in or near Bristol for most of his working life. He was elected Associate of the Institution of British Architects (ARIBA) on 23 January 1854, and Fellow (FRIBA) on 4 March 1861. He was documented as an architect and surveyor between 1851 and 1881, although he was still working on new projects in 1882. He was the first surveyor to the West of England Building Society.

He designed buildings in the Neoclassical style, but would sometimes produce Gothic Revival designs. The Building News described Hirst as a "well-known and widely-esteemed architect", and a "straightforward, genuine Yorkshireman" who was "deservedly popular with all classes". For a while, Hirst designed works in the Bristol Byzantine style in Bristol in partnership with William Bruce Gingell, and also with Thomas Royse Lysaght.

== Works in Weston-Super-Mare ==
=== Royal Hotel, Weston-Super-Mare, c. 1850 ===
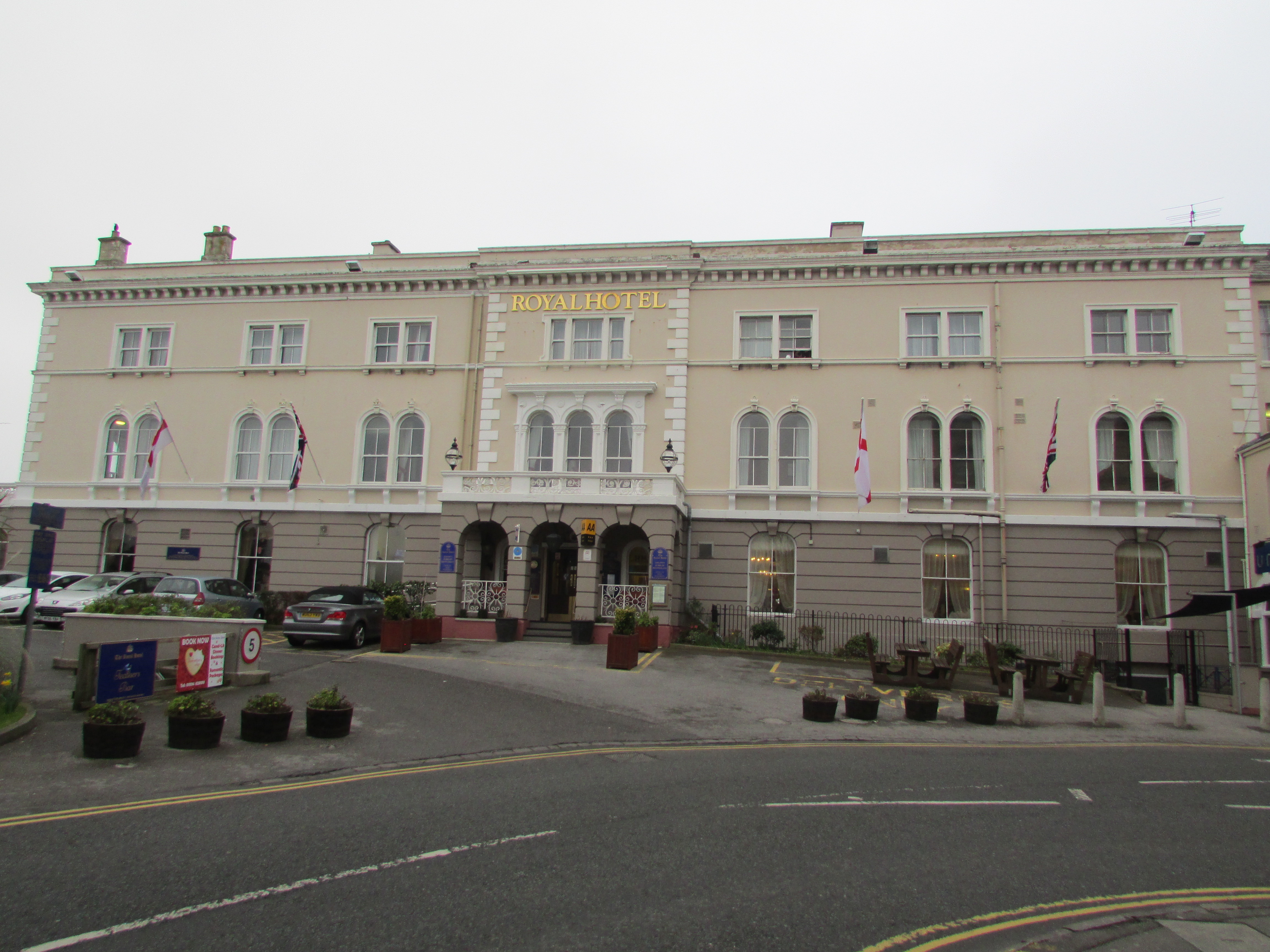
Royal Hotel, Weston-Super-Mare

This is a Grade II listed building. The hotel was originally built in 1808, but Hirst and Samuel Burleigh Gabriel substantially enlarged it around 1850. English Heritage describes it as, "a distinctive Italianate composition with ornate facades that have a high level of decorative detailing". Hirst and Gabriel also improved the posting and livery building in the courtyard to the north of the main hotel building. The hotel itself has cellars and three storeys. It has an entrance bay in the middle, and two long extensions either side of it, making the building symmetrical. The building has been much changed since 1850.

== Works in Bristol ==
The Building News said that Hirst was "connected with all the most important improvement schemes at Bristol, and his numerous buildings invariably exhibited taste and artistic skill". In 1868 his office was at Guildhall Chambers, Bristol. His office was subsequently at 30 Broad Street, Bristol. Between 1880 and 1882 he was working from 8 Small Street, Bristol, and from his home, Avonhirst.

=== Royal West of England Academy ===
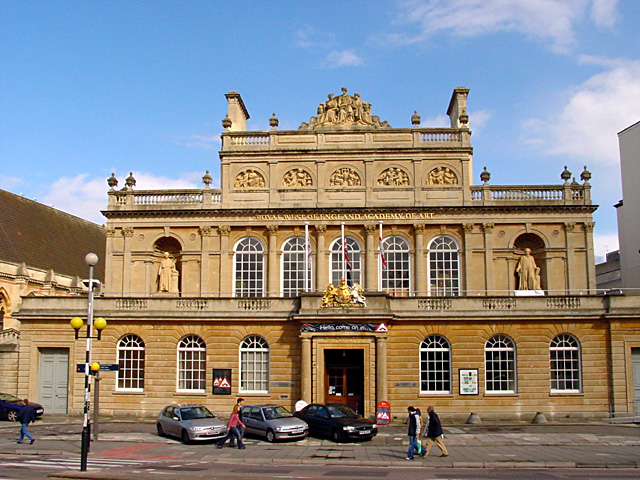
Royal West of England Academy, 1857

This is a Grade II listed building. The façade was designed by Hirst in 1857. (Note: English Heritage mistakenly records Hirst's name as J.R. Hirst in its record of the Royal West of England Academy, Bristol)

=== Avonhirst and Towerhirst, Small Street, Bristol c.1867 ===
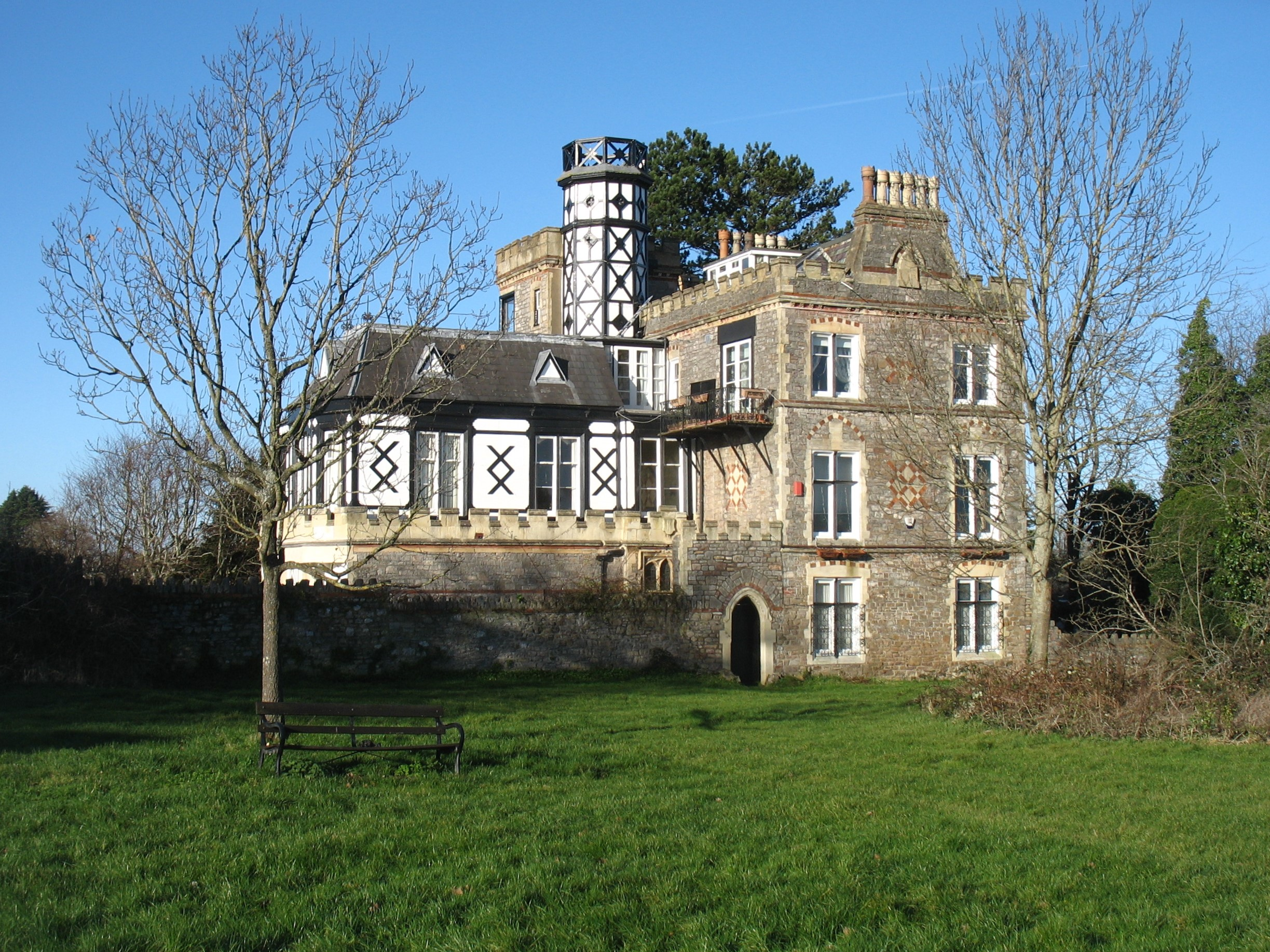
Towerhirst, Bristol

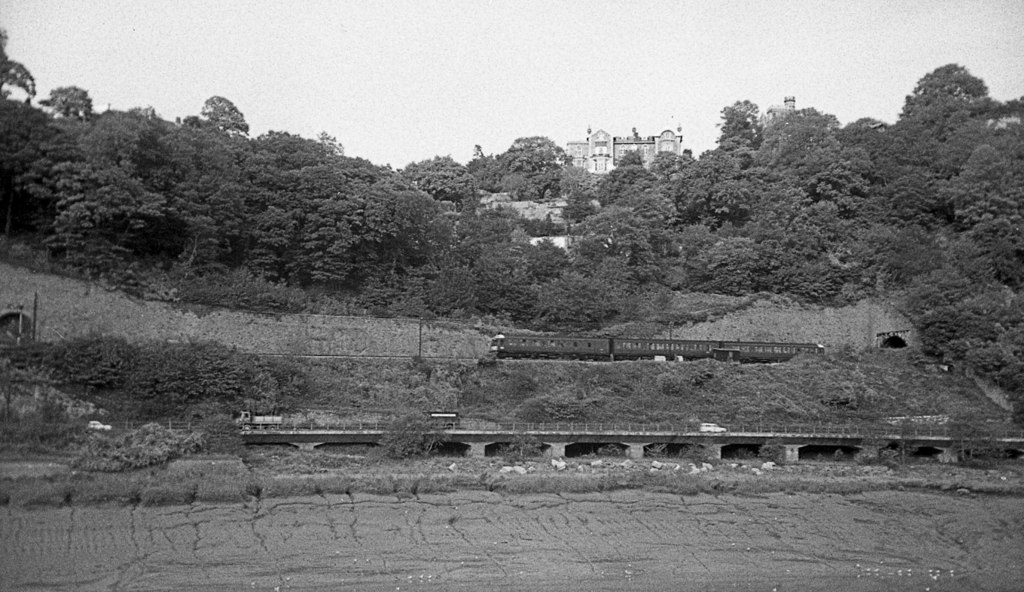
Sea Wall Villas, Bristol

Towerhirst is a Grade II listed building. Around 1867, Hirst built Avonhirst, in Small Street (now Seawalls Road), Bristol, as his own home, with another house, Towerhirst, next to it, and a semi-detached villa with 1.25 acres of land at 1 Sea Wall Villas, Sneyd Park. 1 Sea Wall Villas had a coach house, stable and yard. At point of sale, Towerhirst was described as "a castellated, Gothic, detached villa residence with coach house, stables, gardens an appurtenances" with half an acre of ground and an ornamental lodge. The gardens of all properties were laid out with trees, shrubs, fruit and lawns. Note that Historic England incorrectly credits Towerhirst to the architect's son, H.C.M. Hirst, and gives it a later date of 1891–1892, although J.H. Hirst completed it in 1867.

Close to this suburban idyll, on 18 May 1878, some demolition men were employed in removing the wreck of the steamer Gipsy which was blocking the River Avon. In order to separate the sternpost from the hull, they set an explosive charge so great that "the explosion was heard all over the city". The concussion shattered many windows nearby, and blew out the drawing-room windowglass at Avonhirst. The demolition had attracted an uncontrollable number of sightseers, so when pieces of metal were "hurled far and wide", at least one man was hospitalised.

When Avonhirst was advertised for sale or let in August 1882, a month after Hirst's death, its description was: "Exceptionally warm situation, suitable for invalids, commanding fine views of River Avon, with gardener's lodge, large fruit garden, vineries etc. and woods". Sales from Avonhirst's lodge at that time revealed that the garden had contained peafowl. The Building News described Avonhirst as "a beautiful villa upon one of the most romantic parts of the Avon's banks below Clifton", where he used it to "entertain a large circle of friends and acqaintances". Avonhirst still stands, and was sold for over £2 million in 2023.

=== Stoke Road Drinking Fountain, Bristol, 1877 ===
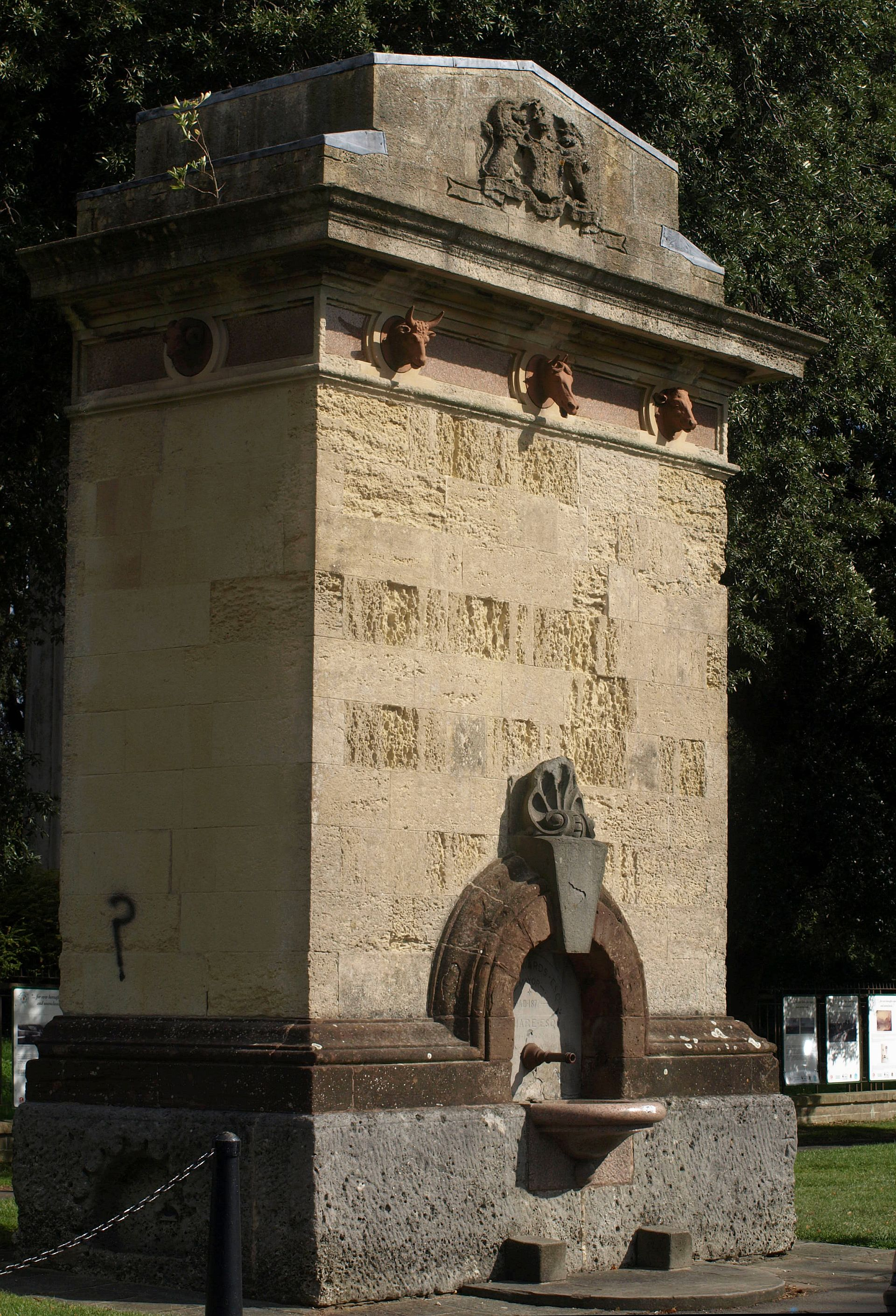
Stoke Road Drinking Fountain, 1877

This drinking fountain on Stoke Road, Bristol, is a Grade II listed building. It is intended for people and animals, was commissioned from Hirst by the Royal Bath and West of England Society, and paid for by its showground's entrance fees. It is made of granite, Portland stone, Bath stone, and iron. It is a rectangular structure, made mainly of Bath stone. The plinth is of Portland stone, and the dressings are of granite, Mansfield stone and Pennant stone. Historic England describes it as: "[a] large rectangular stele with a Pennant apron in front of the plinth with a granite basin, Mansfield moulding to a semicircular arch with a large key above the slate plaque; granite frieze with terracotta animal heads, heavy cornice and sloping top". It was the mayor of Bristol, George Edwards, who unveiled the fountain in 1877. The frieze features the heads of a cow, horse and bull, with rams' heads at each end; all made of painted cast iron, and fixed onto polished red granite. There is a red granite basin with a scallop-shell keystone above, for the main tap, and below are troughs for animals.

=== New road scheme, Bristol, before 1882 ===
Not long before he died, Hirst "brought forward a scheme for constructing a new thoroughfare upon an easy gradient between Colston Street and the top of Park Street, and in connexion with which some rather extensive excavations were made opposite the New Theatre".

=== Almshouses, Bristol, 1882 ===
On 21 April 1882, three months before his death, Hirst was calling for tenders for "the rebuilding of the Rev. Dr White's Almshouses for 36 inmates, between Temple Street and Temple Back", Bristol.

== Works in Harrogate ==
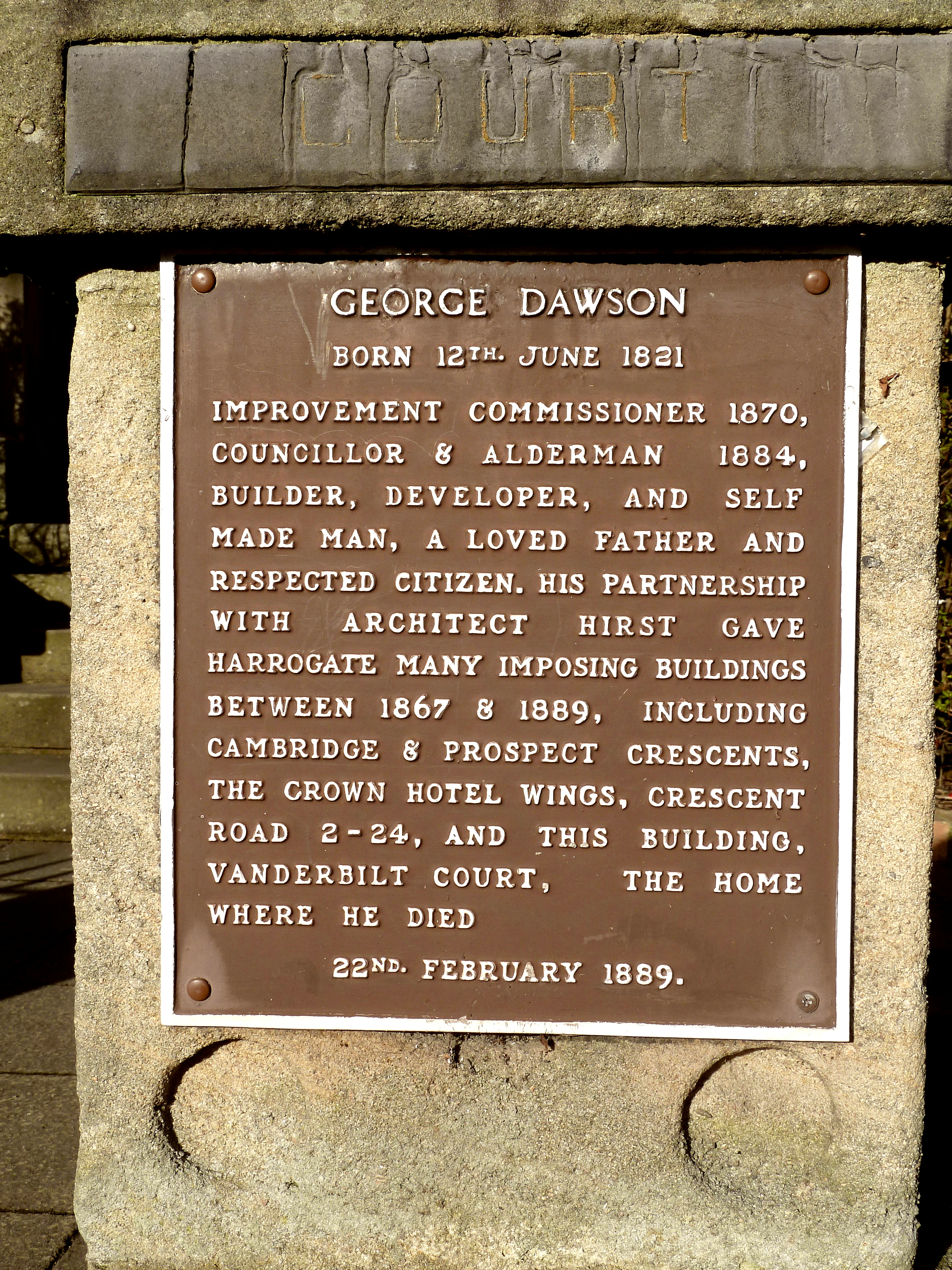
Harrogate brown plaque, mentioning Hirst

Hirst ran an office in Harrogate, because between 1867 and 1882 he designed a large number of buildings there. The Building News commented, "He largely contributed to the architectural adornment of that thriving resort". The Harrogate Herald said that Hirst was "well-known in Harrogate as the designer of several of the noblest erections in the town".

Hirst's main client for the development of Harrogate was George Dawson. For Dawson he designed the following Harrogate projects: Vanderbilt Court as Dawson's home in Victoria Avenue, the wings of the Crown Hotel in Crescent Road, Cambridge Crescent and Prospect Crescent, St Peter's Church, the Victoria Park and West End Park developments, buildings in James Street, Montpelier Gardens, the Pump Room and Rink (since demolished), the Crown buildings in Cheltenham Square, and Cleveden with adjacent villas in Victoria Park.

=== Pump Room, Harrogate, c. 1869 ===
Around 1869, Dawson built a new pump room designed by J.H. Hirst, near the Montpellier Quarter in Harrogate, but it was demolished in 1954.

=== Crown Hotel and Montpellier Estate, 1884–1870 ===
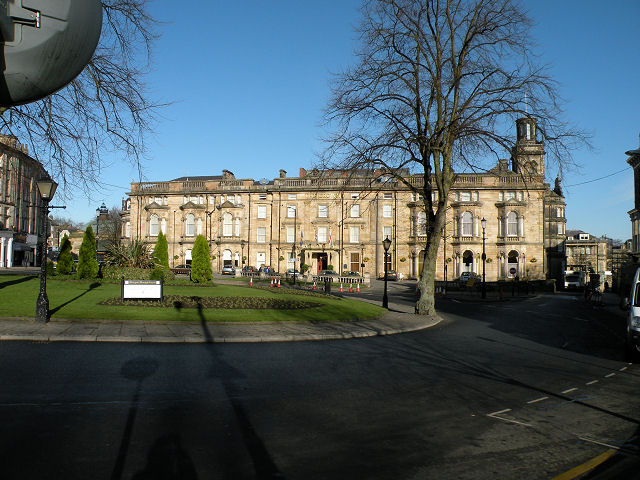
The Crown Hotel with wings

This set includes the wings of the Crown Hotel and 1–3 Crown Place, all developed by George Dawson to designs by Hirst. 1–3 Crown Place are Grade II listed buildings. Historian Malcolm Neesam comments that, "the Crown's Georgian wings were removed and replaced by Hirst with a powerful pair of Italian Renaissance replacements that gave the building great character and nobility".

The Crown Place buildings were completed in 1884, as a commercial, 3-storey terrace with a gritstone ashlar frontage, slate roof and bracketed eaves. Between the shops are Corinthian columns, and above them are sash windows. Some of the shops have doorways with fanlights, and shop windows with moulded heads and keystones.

=== St Peter's Church, Harrogate, 1870–1871 ===
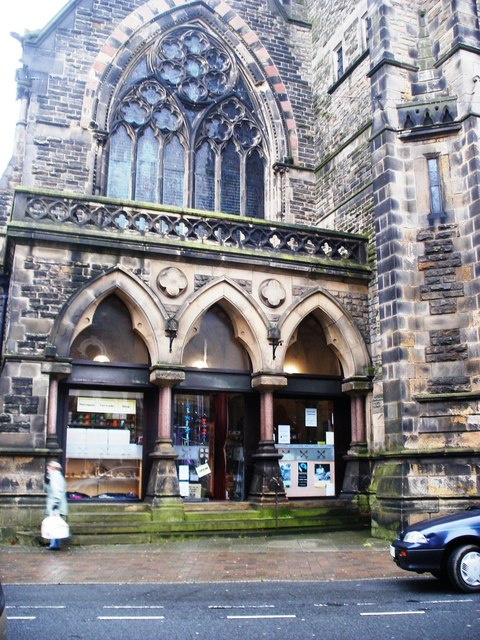
St Peter's Church, Harrogate

This Gothic Revival building was a departure in design for Hirst, and he was "not essentially an ecclesiastical architect". Nevertheless, it is a Grade II listed building, intended to seat 1,000 worshippers at a cost of £10,000 (equivalent to £1,018,420.07 in 2025) without the tower. The foundation stone was laid in April 1870, and before the building was quite finished it was consecrated on 10 September 1871 by Bishop Ryan. At the opening, Hirst presented the church with a "chaste marble screen". The Knaresborough Post said that the building, "situate in a commanding position ... will form a prominent and handsome addition to a locality which at present boasts some fine buildings".

After the consecration there was a "magnificent déjeuner" for fifty of the more important attendees at the Prospect Hotel, at which Hirst was one of those who responded to the many toasts. In the afternoon a separate dinner at the George Hotel was arranged for forty of the workmen who had constructed the edifice and their employers. Again there were many toasts, including one congratulating Hirst as architect, and God Save the Queen was sung when the event ended at eight o' clock.

Apart from the tower, which was added after Hirst's death, the church of 1871 was designed with many revived 13th- and 14th-century architectural features. It has a gabled porch, and the nave – which is complete with arcade, aisles, transepts, traceried windows and an apse – has an arch-braced roof, slated above, with coped gables. The exterior walls are of rusticated and ashlar sandstone, with parapets and buttresses.

=== Cambridge Crescent, Harrogate, 1867–1873 ===
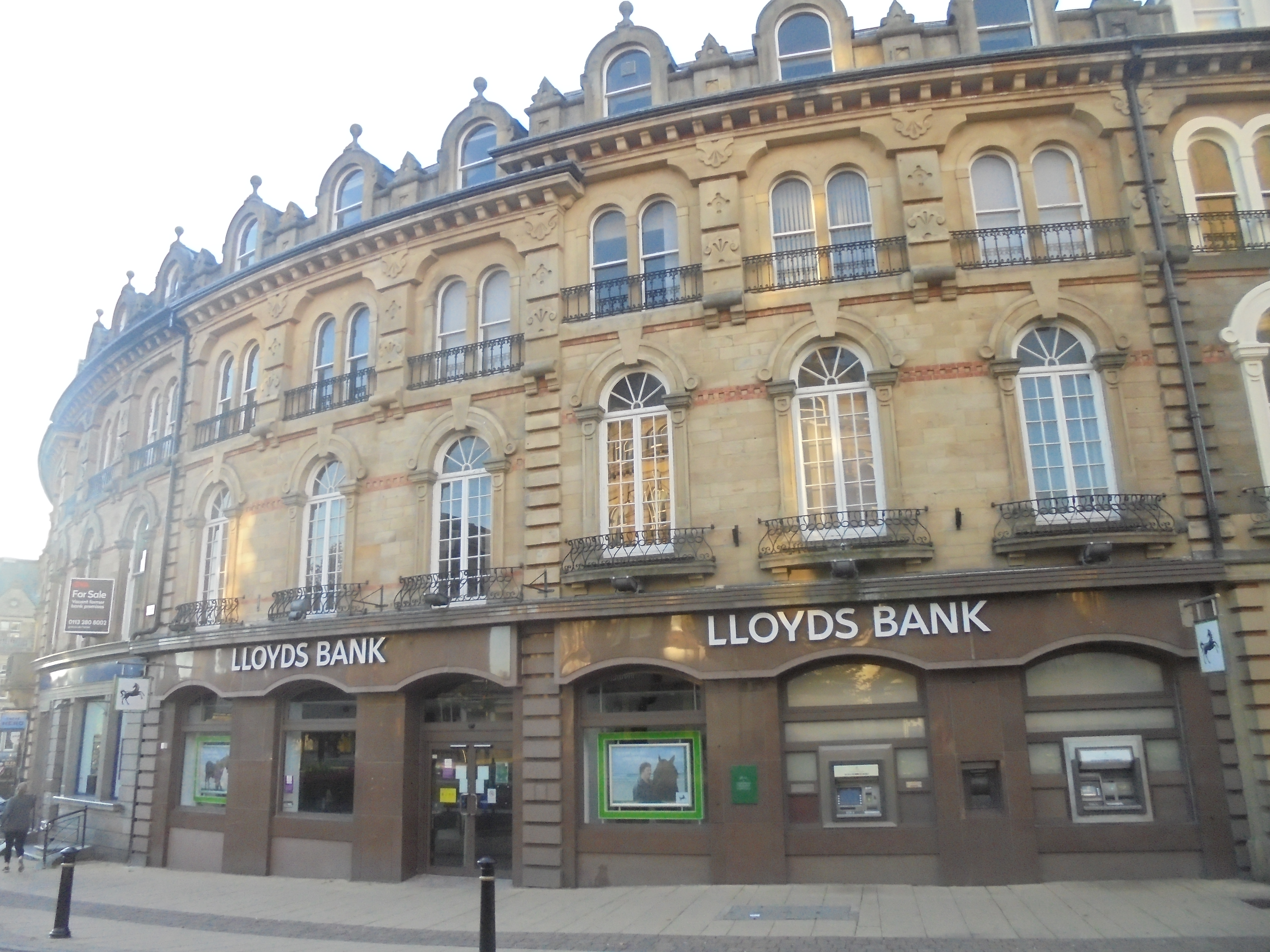
Cambridge Crescent, showing stepped units

This is a Grade II listed building. George Dawson had begun building Cambridge Crescent to Hirst's design by 1867, and by 1873 it was almost finished. Malcolm Neesam described the building, along with Prospect Crescent, as a "magnificent structure". This is a building with a convex, bayed frontage, built sideways on a hill, so that the units are stepped downhill. Like Prospect Crescent, it has cellars, dormers, and three storeys, with attic windows, a parapet and a cornice. The frontage is ashlar gritstone with dressings in red brick and "coarse florid detailing", sash windows and balconies with ironwork. The mansard roof is gabled, but a central unit, number four, has a dormer with pediment and entablature, with pilasters on each side. The ground floor contains commercial premises. The National Westminster Bank premises at numbers 4 and 6 have a Flemish Renaissance frontage, with cornices, columns and capitals, carved figures and a coat of arms. The building is home to the Stray Ferret.

=== Grosvenor Buildings, Harrogate, 1874–1875 ===
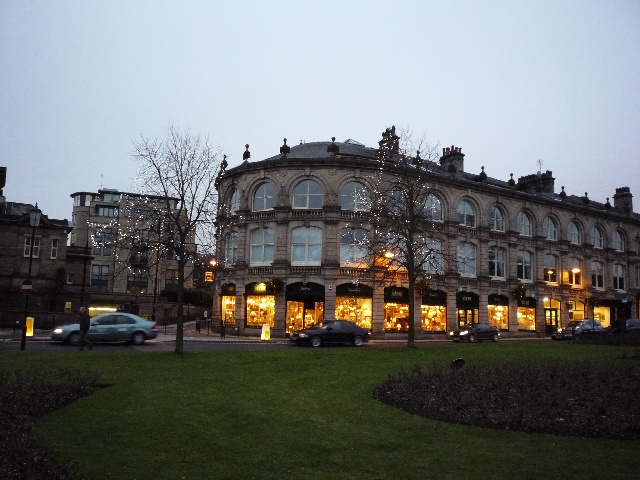
Grosvenor Buildings, Harrogate

This is a Grade II listed building, comprising numbers 14–24 on the south side of Crescent Road, Harrogate. It is a terrace of shops with a curved end, having nine bays along the side, and six bays around the curved end. Like other designs by Hirst for Harrogate, it is fronted in gritstone ashlar and has a slate roof. This one has draped urns along the top of the cornice. There are rusticated pilasters which reach up from between the shops to the first floor. Above that are arched sash windows. Below each of the first- and second-floor windows are blind, balustraded balconies. Above the ground-floor and first-floor windows, Hirst designed segmented, shallow arches with keystones.

=== Prospect Crescent, Harrogate, 1873–1880 ===
This is a Grade II listed building. Harrogate historian Malcolm Neesam describes Prospect Crescent as follows, while deploring the modern changes wrought on the building:

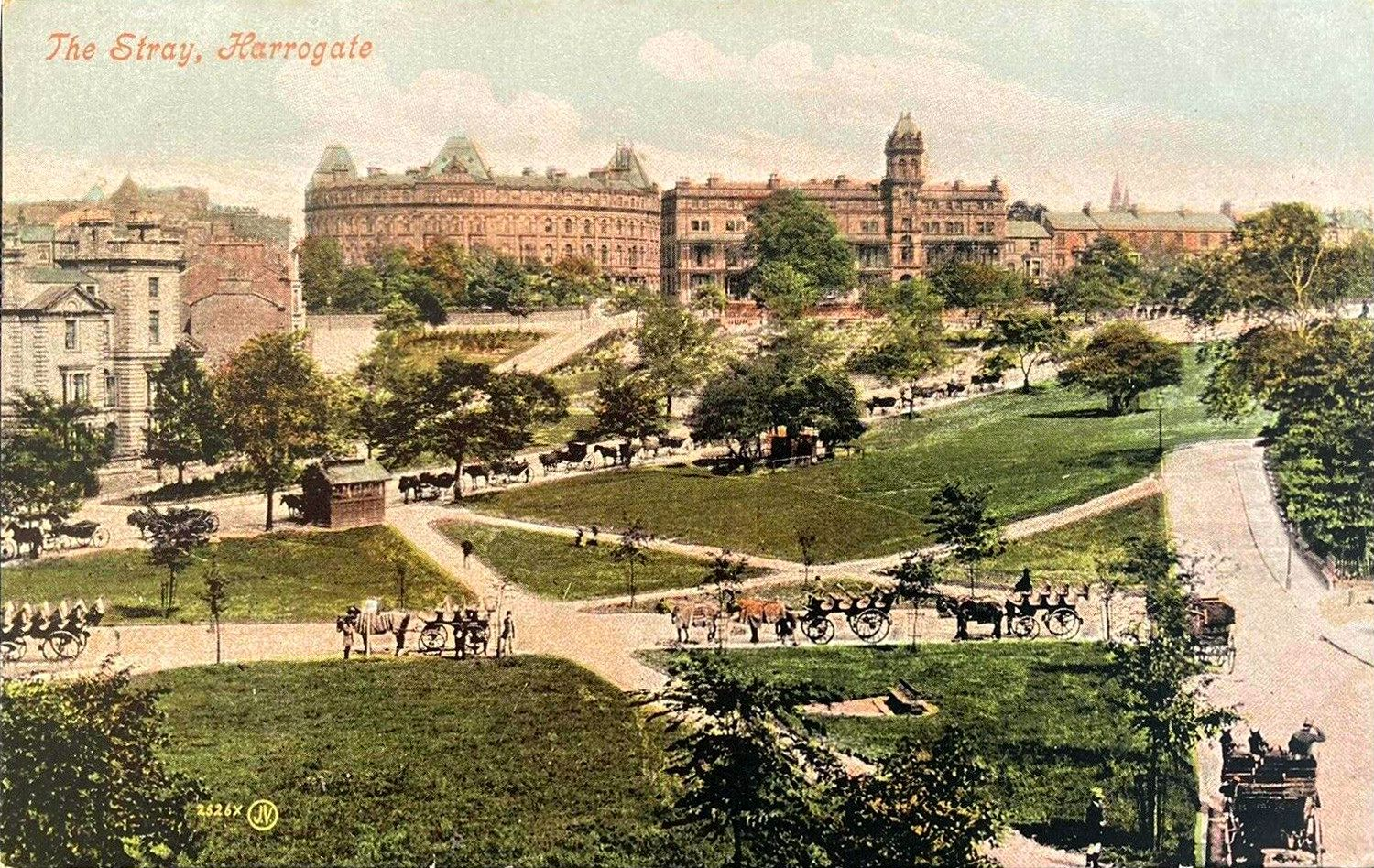
Prospect Crescent (top, centre), before 1914

Prospect Crescent, which overlooks the Low Harrogate Valley so impressively, is a massive pile of masonry with giant Corinthian pilasters running up the first and second storeys and several canted bays, also in solid stone. Each extremity of the crescent is crowned with a tall roof pavilion, similar to several others placed on local buildings of that time. When seen in late afternoon or early evening, with light from the setting sun illuminating its handsome frontage, Prospect Crescent takes on the appearance of a mini Colosseum. It is, however, a thousand pities that after the First World War, a series of alterations to the ground-floor commercial premises destroyed all save one of the magnificently florid façades created by builder George Dawson and architect J.H. Hirst.

Historic England describes this design of Hirst's as a three-storey, symmetrical crescent in gritstone ashlar, with cellars below and central pavilions on the exterior. There is "ornamental iron cresting" on the pavilions, and a hipped roof with slates. The exterior has Corinthian pilasters, blind balustrades, decorative urns, sash windows and bay windows.

=== Vanderbilt Court, Harrogate, 1880 ===
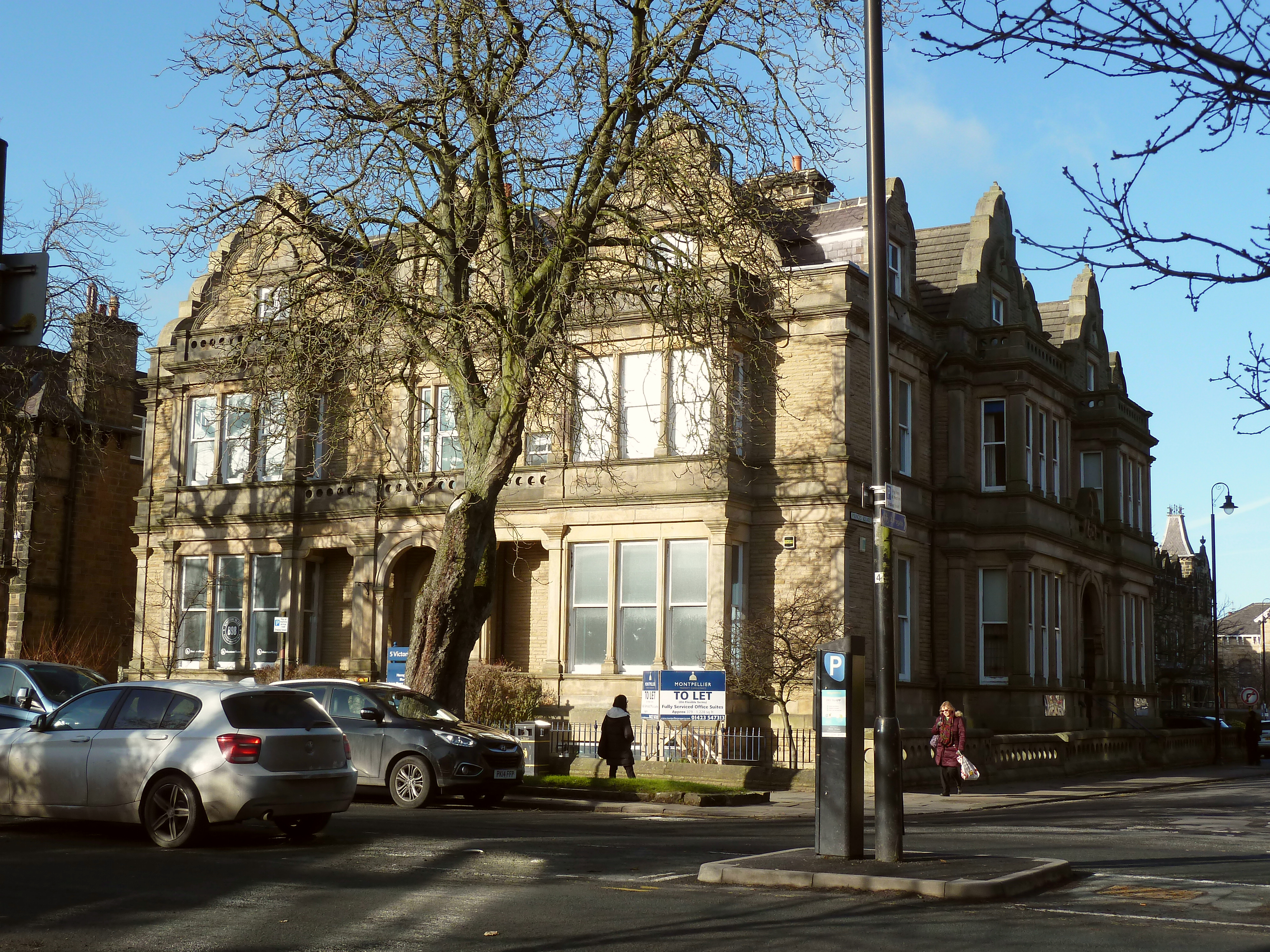
Vanderbilt Court

Malcolm Neesam suggested that this big house, at 5 Victoria Avenue in Harrogate, designed by Hirst as George Dawson's residence, was playfully named after the financier Cornelius Vanderbilt, in reference to Dawson's rise to riches. However Dawson's family had a different version of the story: that "Dawson ... let his home to the American family of that name, hence the title". In June 1915, Dawson died there, and his large funeral cortège proceeded to the house to pick up the coffin and transport it to the Wesley Chapel, Harrogate, for the funeral.

In 1915 part of the house was opened as a convalescent home for twelve officers injured in the First World War. Invalided officers who could not find a place in the home were housed in neighbouring buildings, and permitted to spend the day in Vanderbilt Court. The Baths Committee offered treatment, overseen by Doctor Morris, and neighbours who possessed cars arranged outings for the inmates. This was a short-lived arrangement, and by 1916 the building was being let out for rent as a house or apartments. A 1940s advertisement for a whole-house rent said that it had "a large entrance hall, two fine, lofty front rooms, back froom and lavatory. First floor: four excellent rooms, bathroom, water closet and scullery. Second floor: four rooms, bathroom-lavatory and kitchen. Basement: six various useful rooms, including sitting-room, kitchen, scullery, storerooms, pantries, and lavatory".

=== 2–6 Crescent Road, Harrogate, 1884–1886 ===
This is a Grade II listed terrace building. Although Hirst had died in 1882, George Dawson completed this project in 1886 to Hirst's original designs, it being the second phase of the development of the Crown Hotel Estate. It is similar to 1–3 Crown Place, which was also designed by Hirst. It is a three-storey building, fronted with gritstone ashlar, with a hipped roof and sash windows. It is also a commercial building, with shop windows which have keystones above. The shop doors originally had fanlights, and the shop windows have rusticated pilasters between them.

== Affiliations ==
Hirst was a Freemason of the Royal Sussex Lodge of Hospitality in Bristol, between 1855 and 1858, and a volunteer captain in the Bristol Artillery Corps, namely the 1st Gloucester (Bristol) Artillery. On a dark December evening in 1871, the Volunteer Service Gazette reported a torchlit "march out and sham fight" for eighty men on Durdham Down, Bristol, organised by Hirst and his fellow officers. Afterwards, the men were provided with a camp fire and refreshments by Hirst, who entertained the officers at his nearby house, Avonhirst. As the men marched back to town from the camp fire, they passed Avonhirst, and stopped to cheer and make speeches.

== Accidental death ==
Towards the end of his life, Hirst was ill for some time. However he continued to work, and was working on a Harrogate project on the day before his death. He died in a fall on the night 5–6 July 1882, at his home, Avonhirst, Westbury-on-Trym, Gloucestershire. (Note: GRO index: Deaths Sep 1882 Hirst John Henry 56 Barton Regis 6a 82a)

The inquest was held by E. M. Grace, coroner for Gloucestershire, in Bristol on 7 July. Hirst's sons and housemaid Eliza Bowyer were in the house, and he remained working in his study long after they had retired. At eleven o' clock, he told Bowyer that he felt "a little faint", and that was the last time he was seen alive, although Bowyer "heard him walking early that morning", as Hirst was wont to do. Nothing was known about the events of the night. The housemaid found Hirst "at the foot of the stairs" at seven o' clock in the morning, when she came from her room. Without going downstairs, she at once called the gardener, Samuel Sellick, from a window. Sellick found Hirst "lying at the bottom of the stairs, with his head downwards", with no pulse and cold hands. He was face down on the floor, with the ends of his legs lying a few feet up the stairs. Sellick alerted Hirst's sons in the house, and his brother-in-law G.W. Edwards, and Dr Marshall, were also called. "Apparently [Hirst] had gone to bed that night". The doctor noted that Hirst had broken his neck, his body was still warm, he had rigor mortis and he "had been dead some time", Hirst was fully dressed, his body had no marks or injuries, and the doctor concluded that Hirst had died instantaneously after falling downstairs.

When The Building News in London reported his death on 14 July 1882, some of the facts were changed:

The family being from home, and Mr Hirst alone, the servants went to bed at the usual hour on Wednesday night, leaving Mr Hirst up. Nothing else is known until the next morning when a servant coming down found the unfortunate gentleman at the foot of the stairs, head downwards, fully dressed, but dead and cold. Medical examination proved that his neck was dislocated, and that his death must have been instantaneous. It is surmised that on retiring to rest he must have been seized with dizziness or a fit, and falling backwards had died directly. The verdict of the jury was accidental death by falling downstairs.

Hirst's will was proved on 26 August 1882 at Bristol. He left £9,177 13s 5d (equivalent to £954,560.02 in 2025). (Note: Hirst is buried in plot 119 of St Andrew's Churchyard, Clifton, Bristol. Buried alongside him are his wife and two of their children who died in infancy (See image of grave).)
