= Lambwath Stream =

Stream in the East Riding of Yorkshire, England

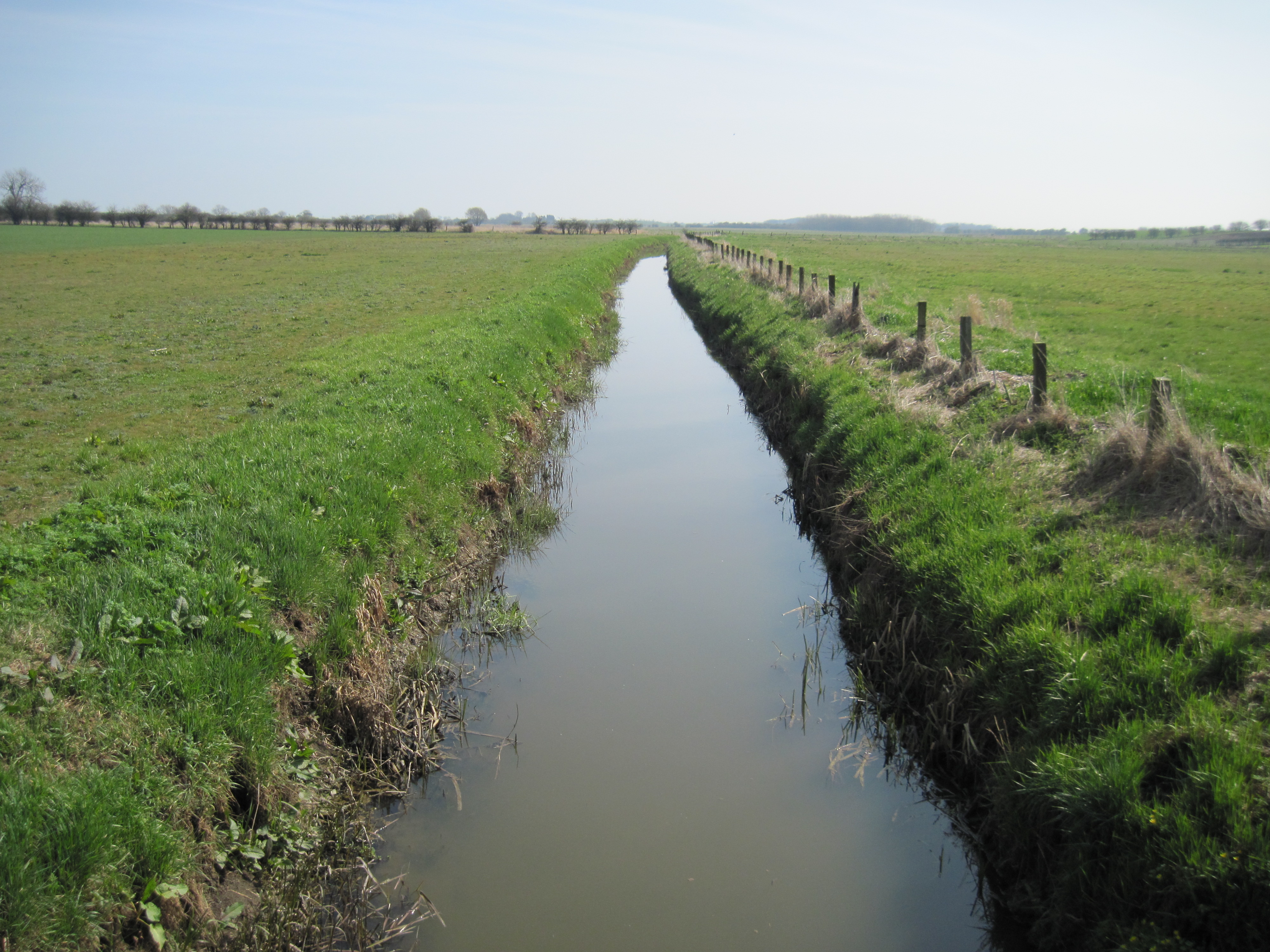
- Lambwath Stream

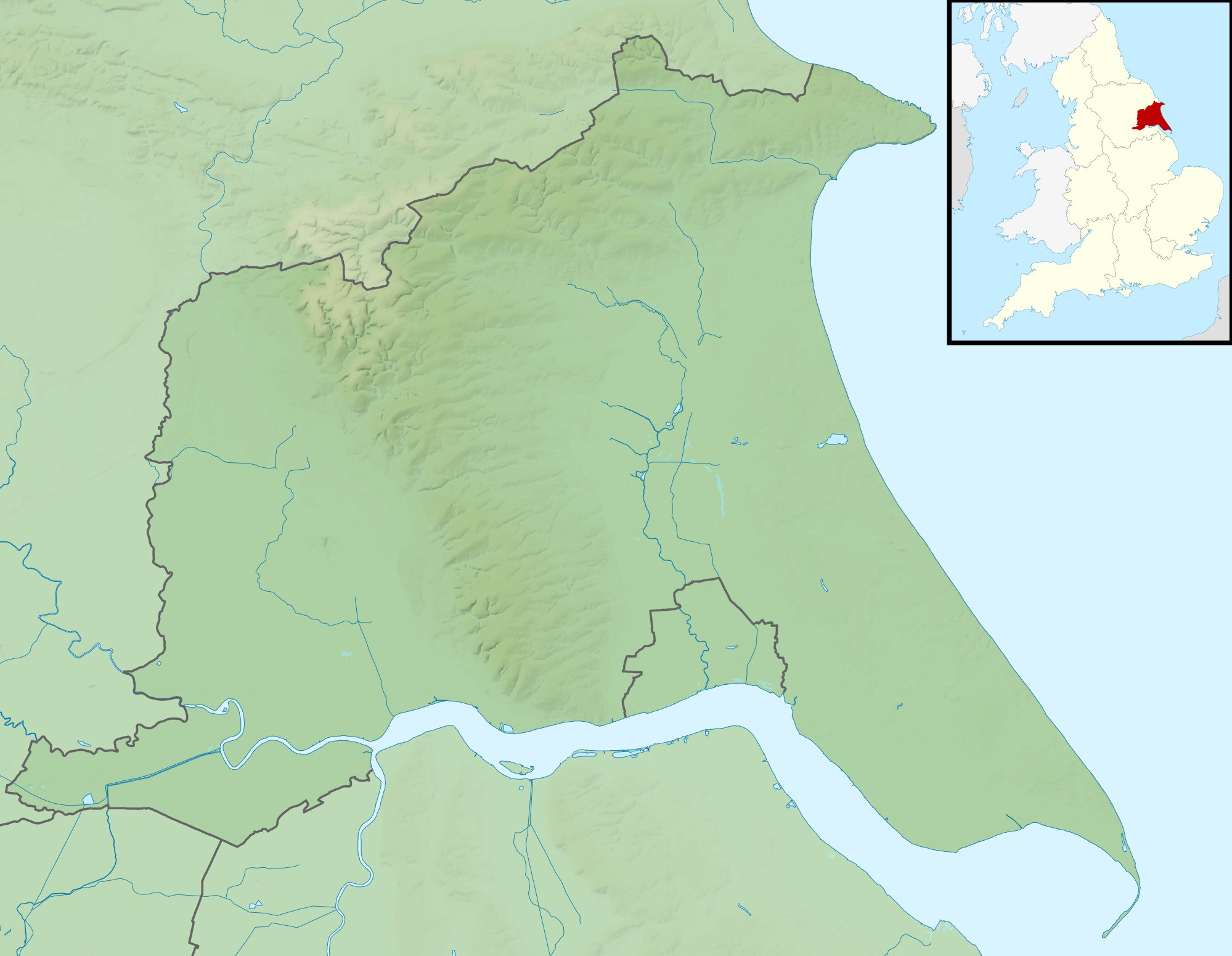
- Location within East Riding of Yorkshire

Physical characteristics
- Source
  - location: Aldbrough
  - coordinates: 53.832°N 0.088°W
  - elevation: 15.9 metres (52 ft)
- Mouth
  - location: Wawne
  - coordinates: 53.820°N 0.310°W
  - elevation: 3.2 metres (10 ft)
- Length: 18.57 kilometres (11.54 mi)
- Basin size: 54.88 square kilometres (21.19 sq mi)

Basin features
- EA waterbody ID: GB104026066860

Lambwath Stream (or Lambwath Drain), is a small beck in the Holderness area of the East Riding of Yorkshire, England. The stream is unusual in that despite rising only metres away from the coast, it runs inland (westwards) for nearly 19 kilometres (12 mi) into the Holderness Drain. The watercourse was heavily modified during Medieval times to act as a drain.

== History ==
The Lambwath Stream rises at Aldbrough on the Holderness coast. Despite being only a few metres short of the coast, the watercourse flows westwards away from the sea inland past Withernwick and Skirlaugh. The stream would have originated further eastwards, but the coastal erosion on the Holderness Coast has cut into its former course. An archaeological survey of the coast shows evidence of a westwards leading river valley, that has been washed away with the erosion. Historically, a major source of water for the stream was Lambwath Mere, a post-glacial lake. Lambwath Mere was an important site in medieval times being used for the supply of fish and reeds. It was valued in 1260 at 13 shillings and four pence (equivalent to £1,000 in 2025). Lambwath Mere has been listed as one of the largest of the lost meres of Holderness, being approximately 1-kilometre (0.62 mi) (west to east) and 200 metres (660 ft) wide (north to south).

Near to Withernwick, the stream passes through the Lambwath Meadows SSSI. The fields either side of the watercourse are known for their rich grasslands which are maintained by a traditional management system for their hay. For much of its meander, the Lambwath Stream was the natural border between the north and middle divisions of what was the Holderness Wapentake.

The stream drains an area of 54.88 square kilometres (21.19 sq mi), and flows for 18.57 kilometres (11.54 mi). It rises at around 15.9 metres (52 ft) above sea level, and drops some 12.6 metres (41 ft) to 3.2 metres (10 ft) at Wawne where it feeds into the Foredyke Stream (drain). Attempts were made during the 19th century to get the small valley that the stream flows through either drained, or maintained as part of the Holderness Drainage Board.

In 1210, the monks of Meaux Abbey were granted the right to divert water from Lambwath Stream into their own canal (Monks Dike, or Monksdike), and then in 1235 to canalise the lower reaches of Lambwath Stream itself. Monksdike was nearly 20 feet (6.1 m) wide, and by 1400, it was reported that the flow of water was either severely reduced in summer, or non-existent. It is possible that with the large area that Lambwath Mere covered that the monks thought they would have a good head of water, but the reverse is possibly true, and the diversion of Lambwath Stream accelerated the disappearance of Lambwath Mere. William le Gros, the Count of Aumale, is recorded as having a mill on the beck before 1179.

In the 18th and early 19th centuries, it was reported that flows of water in the stream could be impeded by flooding or a very high tide in the River Hull. Whilst historically the responsibility for maintaining the stream fell to the Holderness Court of Sewers, in the 19th century, control of Lambwath Stream was transferred to the Keyingham Level Drainage board, later to become part of the South Holderness Drainage Board. Its use as a storm drain has seen it affected by pollution; in 2019, it was subject to 99 separate pollution incidents by Yorkshire Water, lasting a total of 328 hours.

The name is thought to be derived from Old Norse and Old English, meaning Lamb Ford. This is believed to be because it was used to wash sheep. There was also a Lambwath House, and a Lambwath Stream in the Sutton-on-Hull area. This stream used to feed the lake in Hull's East Park, until it was covered over and filled in during the late 1960s.

== Settlements ==
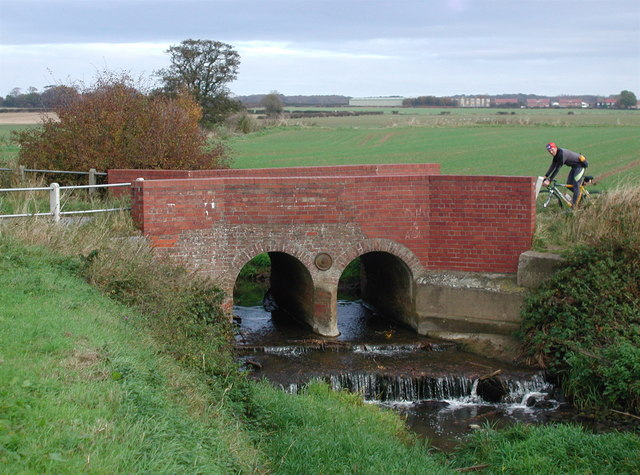
Lambwath Bridge, Benningholme

(upstream to downstream - east to west)

- Aldbrough
- East Carlton
- Withernwick
- Marton
- New Ellerby
- Swine
- Skirlaugh
- Fairholme
- Benningholme
