= Old Ellerby =

Hamlet in the East Riding of Yorkshire, England

Coordinates: 53.821488°N 0.225351°W

- Location within the East Riding of Yorkshire
- OS grid reference: TA169375
  - London: 160 mi (260 km) S
- Civil parish: Ellerby
- Unitary authority: East Riding of Yorkshire
- Ceremonial county: East Riding of Yorkshire
- Region: Yorkshire and the Humber
- Country: England
- Sovereign state: United Kingdom
- Post town: HULL
- Postcode district: HU11
- Dialling code: 01964
- Police: Humberside
- Fire: Humberside
- Ambulance: Yorkshire
- UK Parliament: Beverley and Holderness

Old Ellerby is a hamlet in the East Riding of Yorkshire, England, in an area known as Holderness. It is situated approximately 7 miles (11 km) north-east of Hull city centre and 2 miles (3.2 km) south-east of Skirlaugh, lying to the east of the A165 road.

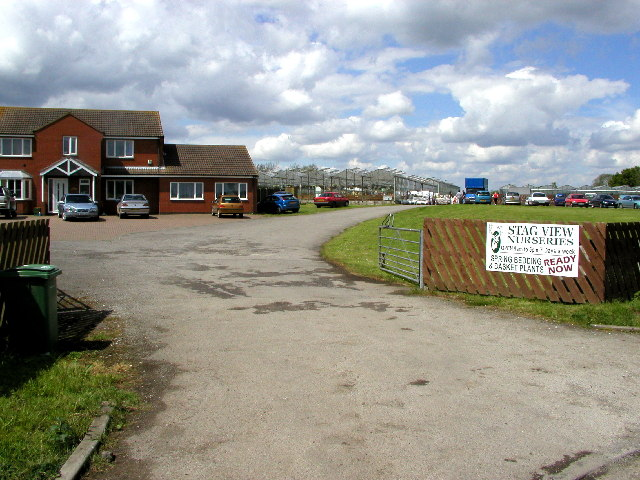
Garden Nurseries at Old Ellerby

Together with its neighbour New Ellerby it forms the civil parish of Ellerby.

In 1823 Ellerby was in the civil parish of Swine, and the Wapentake and Liberty of Holderness. Population at the time, including the then settlements of Dowthorp, Langthorp and Owbrough, was 233. Occupations included five farmers, a blacksmith, a wheelwright, a shoemaker, and the landlord of The Board public house, and a further farmer at Dowthorp.

Old Ellerby was served from 1864 to 1902 by Ellerby railway station on the Hull and Hornsea Railway.

The name Ellerby derives from the Old English personal name Aelfweard and the Old Norse bȳ meaning 'village'.

== See also ==
- Listed buildings in Ellerby, East Riding of Yorkshire
