= Sutton Ings =

Suburb of Kingston upon Hull, England

Coordinates: 53.781900°N 0.307200°W

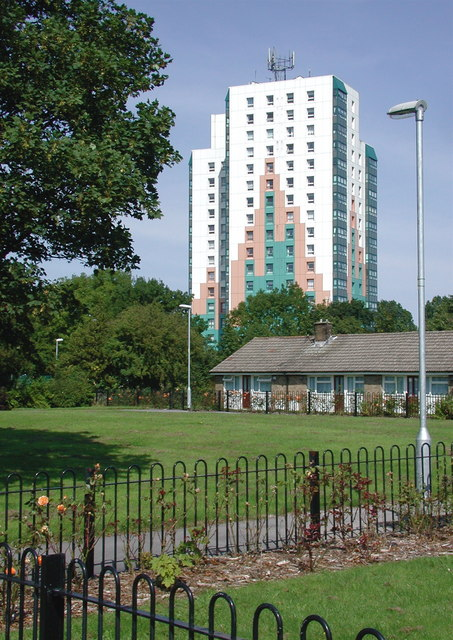
Apartment block in Sutton Ings

Sutton Ings is a suburb of Kingston upon Hull, in the East Riding of Yorkshire, England. It was served by Sutton-on-Hull railway station. It is near the larger area of Sutton-on-Hull.

== Amenities ==
Sutton Ings has a library, a post office, and a few schools.
