= Hornsea (disambiguation) =

Hornsea is a town on the East Yorkshire coast in the UK.

Hornsea may also refer to:

- Hornsea Wind Farm, operational and planned wind farm off the East Yorkshire coast, North Sea
- Hornsea Town railway station, Hornsea, UK
- Hornsea Bridge railway station, Hornsea, UK
- Hornsea Pottery
- Hornsea Town Football Club, playing in Humber Premier League

== See also ==
- Hornsey
