= Hornsea Town =

Hornsea Town may refer to:

- Hornsea Town railway station, former station in East Riding of Yorkshire, England
- Hornsea Town Football Club, club playing in Humber Premier League

== See also ==
- Hornsea, town and civil parish in East Riding of Yorkshire
