= Whitedale railway station =

Disused railway station in Withernwick, East Riding of Yorkshire, England

Whitedale
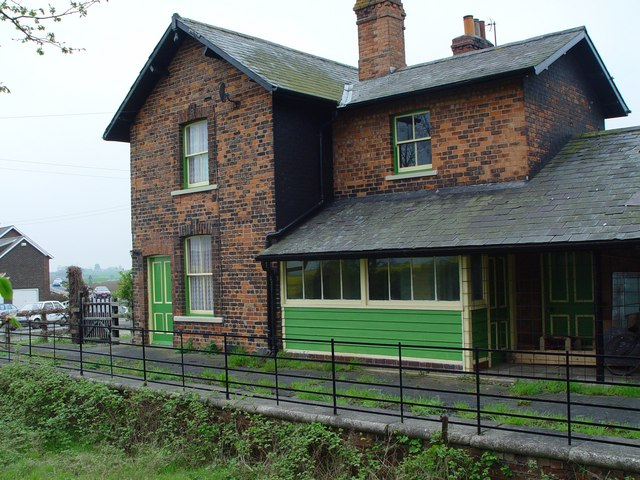
- Station building on the Hull to Hornsea Rail Trail

General information
- Location: Withernwick, East Riding of Yorkshire; England
- Coordinates: 53.851500°N 0.218800°W
- Grid reference: TA172409
- Platforms: 2

Other information
- Status: Closed

History
- Original company: Hull and Hornsea Railway
- Pre-grouping: North Eastern Railway
- Post-grouping: London and North Eastern Railway; North Eastern Region of British Railways

Key dates
- 28 March 1864: Opened
- 19 October 1964: Closed
Location

Whitedale railway station was a railway station which served the villages of Rise and Withernwick in the East Riding of Yorkshire, England. It was on the Hull and Hornsea Railway.

It opened on 28 March 1864 and closed following the Beeching Report on 19 October 1964.

Preceding station	Disused railways	Following station
Burton Constable	North Eastern Railway; Hull and Hornsea Railway	Sigglesthorne
