= Berewick =

Medieval division of land

- Also known as: Herdwick
- How manors, berewicks and sokes were written in the Domesday Book
- Location: England
- Found in: Manor
- Created: Before 1066
- Possible types: Medieval
- Possible status: Defunct

A berewick is a medieval name for a parcel of land, hamlet or village, that was subservient, and tied to, a manor. In certain instances the berewick was some distance from the manor itself and most were recorded in the Domesday Book, but the name predates the Conquest having been part of the Danelaw.

== History ==
A berewick is an outlying farm (or farming area), demesne (or grain storage area), hamlet or village belonging to a named manor as annotated in the Domesday Book. The farming area was not let out to tenants, but was specifically retained for use by the lord of the manor. Berewick appears quite often in the Domesday Book as bere-wīc, bereuita, or berewica (the word derives from the Old English berewic meaning barley wick (barley village).), and indicates a place where barley was grown, on a detached portion of the manor which is independent of the main manor. However, the word exists before the Domesday Book was created, and the term was used in the Danelaw before the Conquest, with examples dating back to the 10th-century.

The people compiling the Domesday Book separated land under the terms manor, then berewick, and then soke, with a soke being small parcel of land whose inhabitants would come under the justice of the lord of the manor. In the entries for the northern counties and those in the East Midlands, the entries for manors, berewicks and Sokes, would be annotated with an 'M', 'B', or 'S', each with a line above it, or some other diacritic (these are shown in the infobox). Occasionally, a soke may have been upgraded to being a berewick, which would mean that the sokemen who worked that land would be at risk of increased tithes to the manor.

Sometimes the berewick could be some distance from the manor itself; in Hampshire, one manor had two berewicks in the county, and three more on the Isle of Wight, separated from the mainland by the Solent. Occasionally the berewick could gain importance as a market-place, trading area, or be elevated to house a chapel, but would always be subservient to the manor, unless it was then established as its own manor under new administration.

Other counties were recorded as having herdwicks rather than berewicks, and both of these instances led to many place names deriving from them, such as the many Hardwicks in Berkshire and Northamptonshire, and the many Bartons elsewhere, with Berwick, Barwick and Borwick being regional variations (the last two in Yorkshire and Lancashire respectively). (Note: Many place name elements descend from corn or barley farm; Barton, Rayhall and Wheatley.) Some berewicks were accounted for in the Domesday Book as belonging to different manors; Withernwick in the East Riding of Yorkshire was recorded as a manor belonging to Drogo, but also as a berewick in the possession of the Canons of St John of Beverley. In Devon listings of the Domesday Book, a berewick was often recorded as the home farm of the manor, rather than an outlying possession.

== See also ==
- Bovate
- Carucate
- Demesne
- Manor
- Soke
