= Rise, East Riding of Yorkshire =

Village and civil parish in the East Riding of Yorkshire, England

Coordinates: 53.862979°N 0.247775°W

Rise
- Location within the East Riding of Yorkshire
- Population: 105 (2011 census)
- OS grid reference: TA153421
- Civil parish: Rise
- Unitary authority: East Riding of Yorkshire
- Ceremonial county: East Riding of Yorkshire
- Region: Yorkshire and the Humber
- Country: England
- Sovereign state: United Kingdom
- Post town: HULL
- Postcode district: HU11
- Dialling code: 01964
- Police: Humberside
- Fire: Humberside
- Ambulance: Yorkshire
- UK Parliament: Beverley and Holderness

Rise is a village and civil parish in Holderness, the East Riding of Yorkshire, England. It is situated approximately 7 miles (11 km) east of the town of Beverley and 5 miles (8 km) south-west of Hornsea. It lies to the east of the B1243 road.

The place-name 'Rise' is first attested in the Domesday Book of 1086, where it appears as Risun in the Holderness Wapentake. This is the plural of the Old English word 'hris', meaning 'brushwood'.

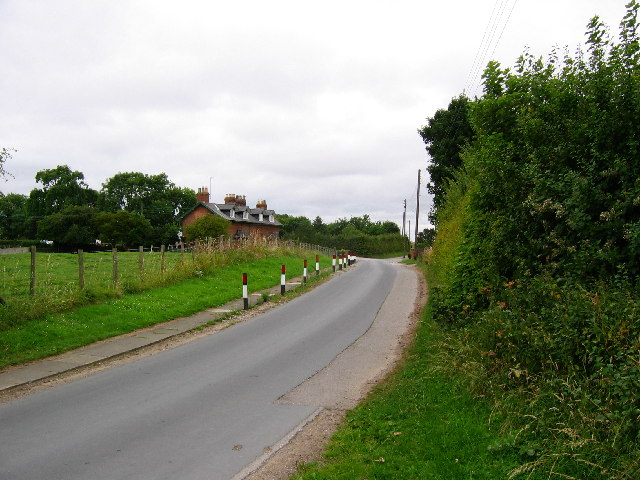
Rise

According to the 2011 UK census, Rise parish had a population of 105, a reduction on the 2001 UK census figure of 119.

Rise was served from 1864 to 1964 by Whitedale railway station on the Hull and Hornsea Railway, until the line was closed following the Beeching Report.

== Rise Hall ==
East of the village is Rise Hall, a Grade II* listed historic house built between 1815 and 1820. In 2010, its restoration by property developer Sarah Beeny was the subject of a TV series, Beeny's Restoration Nightmare, on Channel Four; the property was sold by her in 2019.

== See also ==
- Listed buildings in Rise, East Riding of Yorkshire
