= Walter Skirlaw =

Bishop of Bath and Wells, Durham, and Coventry (died 1406)

- Bishop of Durham
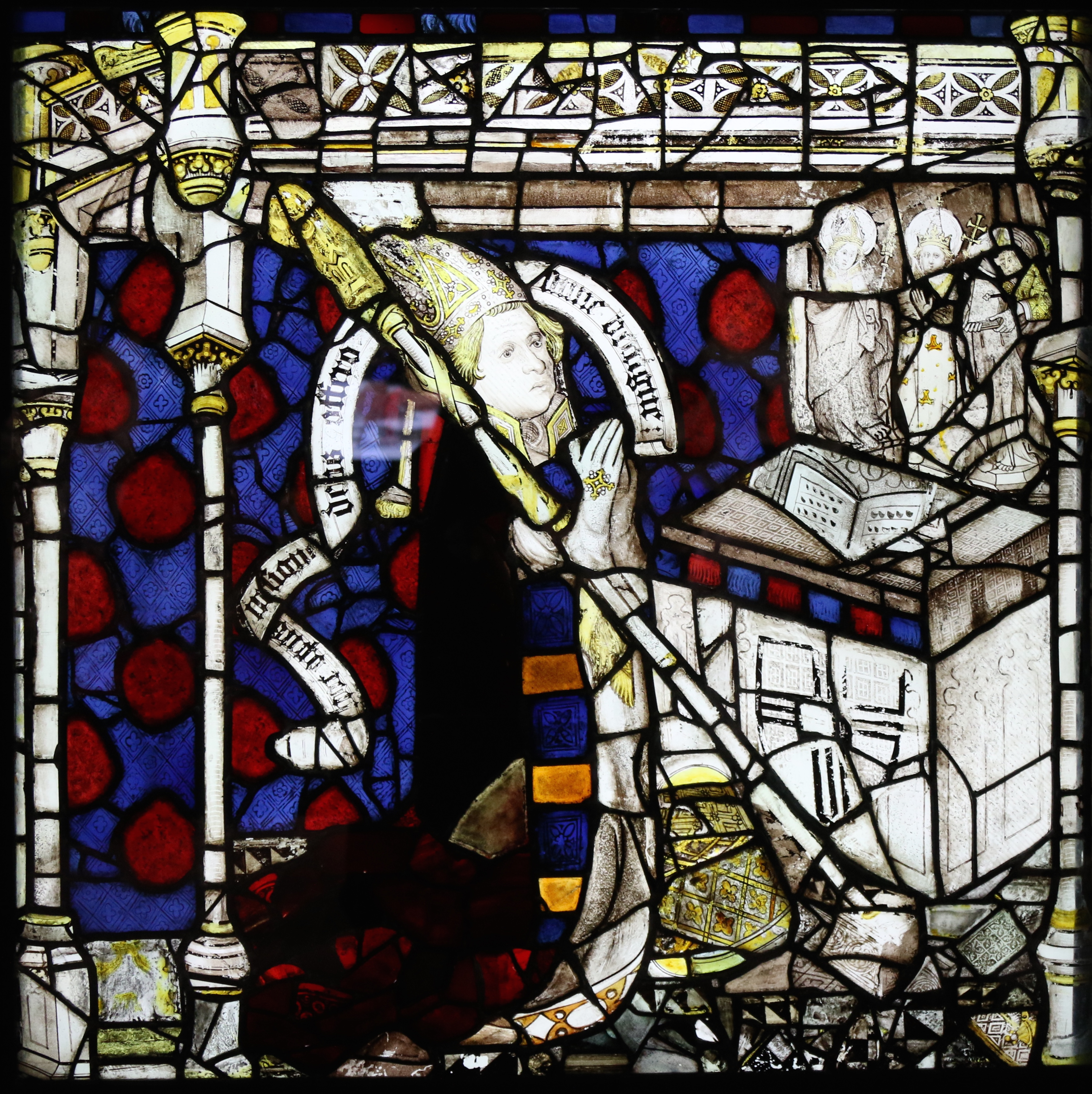
- Image of Bishop Walter Skirlaw in the East Window of York Minster
- Appointed: 3 April 1388
- Term ended: 24 March 1406
- Predecessor: John Fordham
- Successor: Thomas Langley
- Previous posts: Bishop of Coventry and Lichfield; Bishop of Bath and Wells

Orders
- Consecration: 14 January 1386

Personal details
- Born: Swine, East Riding of Yorkshire
- Died: 24 March 1406
- Denomination: Roman Catholic

Walter Skirlaw (Note: Also Walter de Skirlaw, Walter Skirclaw, Walter Skirlaugh, Walter Shirlagh, or Walter Skarlawe) (born Swine parish, Holderness, brought up at Skirlaugh; died 1406) was an English bishop and diplomat. He was Bishop of Durham from 1388 to 1406. He was an important adviser to Richard II of England and Henry IV of England.

== Life ==
Skirlaw was Archdeacon of the East Riding from 1359 to 1385 and Archdeacon of Northampton from 1381. In 1382, he was given custody of the privy seal, filling the office of Lord Privy Seal, which office he held until 1386. He was elected Bishop of Coventry and Lichfield on 28 June 1385, and consecrated on 14 January 1386. Then he was translated to be Bishop of Bath and Wells on 18 August 1386. On 3 April 1388, he was once again transferred, this time to the see of Durham. He would have become Archbishop of York in 1398, but Richard II over-ruled the cathedral chapter, insisting on Richard le Scrope.

Skirlaw was employed on diplomatic missions to Italy in 1381–3, to Calais to negotiate with the French in 1388, and to the Scots. He died on 24 March 1406.

Skirlaw is described as "a munificent prelate. He built bridges at Shincliffe, Bishop Auckland, and Yarm; a refuge tower, a beautiful chapter-house (now in ruins) at Howden; and was a large contributor to the expense of building the central tower of York Cathedral".

During his episcopacy much was added to Durham Cathedral, including its cloisters. He is portrayed in the east stained-glass window in York Minster, which he had made.

== Citations ==
Political offices
Preceded by William Dighton	Lord Privy Seal; 1382–1386	Succeeded by John Waltham
Catholic Church titles
Preceded by Robert de Stretton	Bishop of Coventry and Lichfield; 1385–1386	Succeeded by Richard le Scrope
Preceded by John Harewell	Bishop of Bath and Wells; 1386–1388	Succeeded by Ralph Ergham
Preceded by John Fordham	Bishop of Durham; 1388–1406	Succeeded by Thomas Langley
