= Listed buildings in Wawne =

Wawne is a civil parish in the county of the East Riding of Yorkshire, England. It contains eight listed buildings that are recorded in the National Heritage List for England. Of these, one is listed at Grade I, the highest of the three grades, and the others are at Grade II, the lowest grade. The parish contains the village of Wawne, the hamlet of Meaux, and the surrounding countryside, and the listed buildings consist of houses, cottages and farmhouses, a church and a telephone kiosk.

== Key ==
Grade	Criteria
I	Buildings of exceptional interest, sometimes considered to be internationally important
II	Buildings of national importance and special interest

== Buildings ==
Name and location	Photograph	Date	Notes	Grade
St Peter's Church; 53.81627°N 0.34418°W		12th century	The church has been altered and extended through the centuries, including a restoration in 1874–75. It is built mainly in stone with freestone dressings, brick to the clerestory and to repairs, and slate roofs. The church consists of a nave with a clerestory, north and south aisles, a north porch, a chancel and a northwest tower. The tower has three stages, a moulded plinth, angle buttresses, moulded string courses, and a two-light north window above with is a clock face. The top stage contains tall two-light bell openings with brattished transoms, and above is a low parapet. The north aisle and clerestory have embattled parapets.	I
Abbey Cottage; 53.83902°N 0.34427°W		13th century	The cottage is the last surviving structure of Meaux Abbey, and is derelict. It is in stone with freestone dressings, quoins and a pantile roof. There are two storeys, two bays, and an outshut to the right. On the front are two-light mullioned windows, and on the upper floor are sash windows. At the rear is a doorway with chamfered jambs and a rebuilt segmental head. Inside, there are two inglenook fireplaces.	II
Grange Croft Farmhouse and outbuilding 53.81606°N 0.34012°W	—	Mid-18th century	The house is in colourwashed brick, and has a double-span tile roof with tumbled-in brick to the raised gables. There are two storeys and attics, a double depth plan, and three bays. The central doorway has a fanlight, and a timber hood on brackets. It is flanked by square bay windows, on the upper floor are sash windows, and above are gabled roof dormers with two-light casements. To the right is a single-storey single-bay outbuilding containing doors, and with a low parapet ramped up to the house.	II
Bamforth Farm; 53.81916°N 0.35403°W		Mid to late 18th century	The farmhouse is in rendered and colourwashed brick, with a dentilled brick eaves cornice, and a tile roof with raised gables. There are two storeys, four bays, and a rear wing. On the front is a doorway with pilasters and a bow window, and the other windows are sashes.	II
Wawne Grange; 53.83009°N 0.33583°W		Mid to late 18th century	The farmhouse is in red brick, and has a pantile roof with raised coped gables. There are two storeys and three bays. The doorway is in the centre, and the windows are sashes under segmental brick arches.	II
4 Main Street; 53.81643°N 0.34332°W		Late 18th century	The house is in red brick, with sprocketed eaves, and a double-span pantile roof with raised gables. There are two storeys, a double depth plan and three bays. The central doorway has pilasters, panelled reveals and a soffit, and a fanlight with radial glazing. The windows are sashes under wedge lintels.	II
Meaux Abbey Farm; 53.84937°N 0.33545°W		Late 18th century	The farmhouse is in red brick, with a moulded timber eaves cornice, and a slate roof with raised coped gables. There are two storeys and three bays, and flanking single-storey wings. In the centre is a round arch containing a recessed doorway, with fluted pilasters, a fanlight with radial glazing, imposts and a keystone. The windows are tripartite sashes under flat gauged brick arches. On the wings are painted Venetian windows under flat gauged brick arches.	II
K8 telephone kiosk 53.81607°N 0.34274°W		From 1968	The telephone kiosk at the junction of Main Street and Meaux Road is of the K8 type designed by Bruce Martin. It is in cast iron with an aluminium door, it has a square plan and is painted cream. There is a flat domed roof, under which are rectangular panels with rounded corners containing "TELEPHONE".	II
