= John Fordham =

John Fordham may refer to:

- John Fordham (bishop) (died 1425), bishop and treasurer of England
- John Fordham (jazz critic), writer, former editor of Time Out and City Limits
