= Wassand railway station =

Disused railway station in Goxhill, East Riding of Yorkshire, England

Wassand
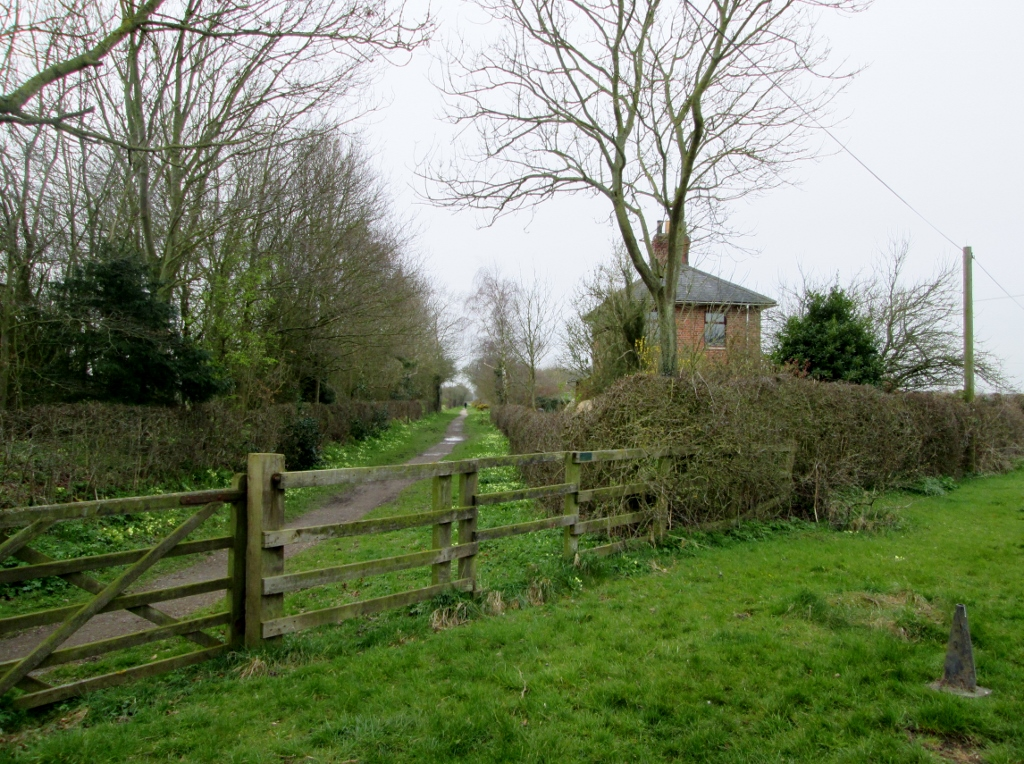
- Hornsea Rail Trail on the former line at the site of Wassand Station (2016)

General information
- Location: Goxhill, East Riding of Yorkshire; England
- Coordinates: 53.883000°N 0.193800°W
- Grid reference: TA188444
- Platforms: 2

Other information
- Status: Closed

History
- Original company: Hull and Hornsea Railway
- Pre-grouping: North Eastern Railway
- Post-grouping: London and North Eastern Railway

Key dates
- 1865: opened as Goxhill
- 1904: renamed
- 1953: closed
Location

Wassand railway station was a railway station that served the villages of Wassand and Goxhill in the East Riding of Yorkshire, England. It was on the Hull and Hornsea Railway.

It opened in 1865, and was originally named "Goxhill". It was renamed "Wassand" (to avoid confusion with Goxhill in Lincolnshire) on 1 October 1904, and closed on 21 September 1953.

Preceding station	Disused railways	Following station
Sigglesthorne	North Eastern Railway; Hull and Hornsea Railway	Hornsea Bridge
