= Benningholme =

Hamlet in the East Riding of Yorkshire, England

Coordinates: 53.833871°N 0.301419°W

- Location within the East Riding of Yorkshire
- OS grid reference: TA118388
  - London: 160 mi (260 km) S
- Civil parish: Swine
- Unitary authority: East Riding of Yorkshire
- Ceremonial county: East Riding of Yorkshire
- Region: Yorkshire and the Humber
- Country: England
- Sovereign state: United Kingdom
- Post town: HULL
- Postcode district: HU11
- Dialling code: 01964
- Police: Humberside
- Fire: Humberside
- Ambulance: Yorkshire
- UK Parliament: Beverley and Holderness

Benningholme is a hamlet in the East Riding of Yorkshire, England, in an area known as Holderness. It is situated approximately 6 miles (10 km) north of Hull city centre and 1 mile (1.6 km) south-west of the village of Skirlaugh. It forms part of the civil parish of Swine.

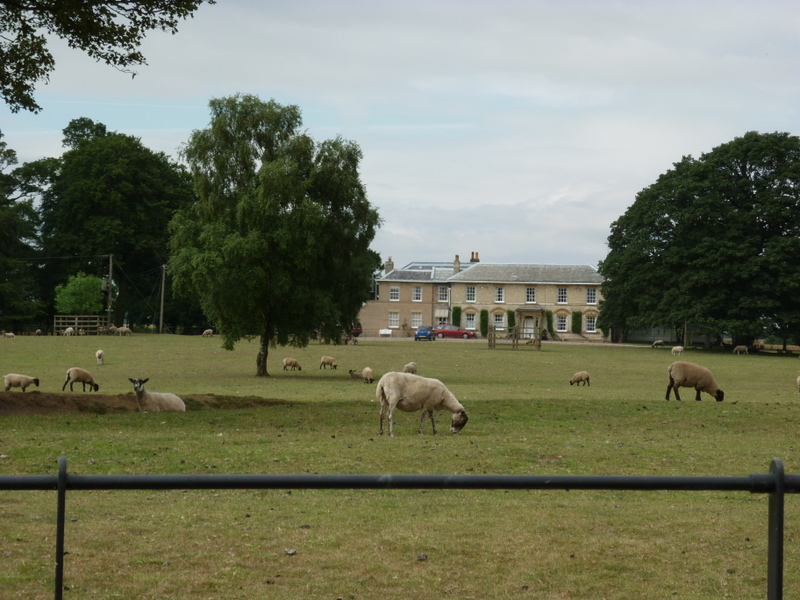
Benningholme Hall

The name Benningholme derives from the Old English personal name Bena, the place name forming suffix, ing, and the Old Norse holmr meaning 'island'. So, 'island connected with Bena'.

Benningholme is listed in the Domesday Book as "Benicol" and "Benincol". It was within the Holderness Middle Hundred of the East Riding of Yorkshire. The hall and manor comprised 29 villagers, 5 smallholders. 6 freemen and 4 men-at-arms, with 53 ploughlands, woodland, and 274 acres (1.1 km^{2}) of meadow. At the Norman Conquest Ulf Fenman was the lord, this transferred in 1086 to Drogo de la Beuvriere, who also became Tenant-in-chief.

Benningholme is the site of a deserted medieval village (DMV), near Benningholme Grange (farm), and Benningholme Hall. In 1571 an enclosure was noted. The deserted settlement is defined by now hardly discernible earthworks.

In 1899 Benningholme, as part of the township of Benningholme-with-Grange, was within the parish of Skirlaugh. Benningholme township land was owned by The Crown, which was also the lord of the manor. Chief crops grown in the parish were wheat, oats, turnips, beans and seeds, within an area of 1,470 acres (6 km^{2}). Benningholme's population in 1891 was 88. Post was directed through Hull, being collected from and distributed to Skirlaugh by foot messenger. Skirlaugh contained the nearest money order and telegraph office.

A half-mile (800 metres) to the east of Benningholme is the Grade II listed Benningholme Hall, an 1820–30 late Georgian house. Built of grey gault brick, it is of a five-bay and two-storey construction with a hipped roof of Welsh slate. The central entrance is surrounded by a portico with an entablature supported by columns of ionic style. At the rear of the building is an iron veranda along its length, with a bow structure part enclosing a garden below. Attached to the original house is a 20th-century extension.

== See also ==
- Listed buildings in Swine, East Riding of Yorkshire
