= Swine railway station =

Disused railway station in Swine, East Riding of Yorkshire, England

Swine
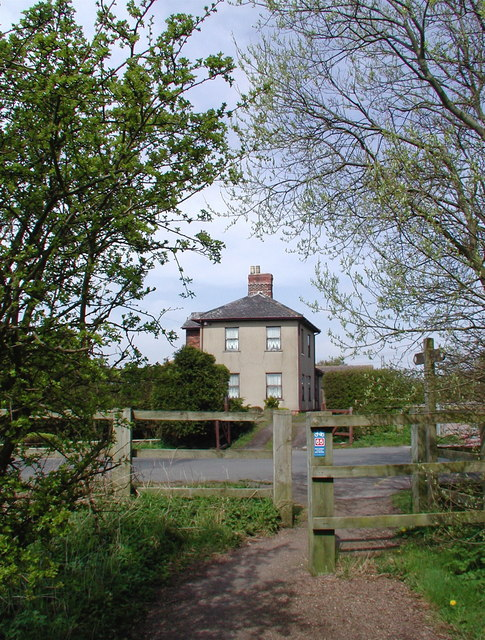

General information
- Location: Swine, East Riding of Yorkshire; England
- Coordinates: 53.804200°N 0.265100°W
- Grid reference: TA143356
- Platforms: 2

Other information
- Status: Closed

History
- Original company: Hull and Hornsea Railway
- Pre-grouping: North Eastern Railway (UK)

Key dates
- 1864: opened
- 1964: closed
Location

Swine railway station was a railway station that served the village of Swine in the East Riding of Yorkshire, England. It was on the Hull and Hornsea Railway.

It opened on 28 March 1864, and closed following the Beeching Report on 19 October 1964.

| Preceding station | Disused railways | Following station |
|---|---|---|
| Sutton-on-Hull | North Eastern Railway; Hull and Hornsea Railway | Skirlaugh |
