= Anne Gargill =

- Born: circa 1625; Swine, East Riding of Yorkshire
- Died: after 1659
- Known for: Quaker writings

Anne Gargill (born about 1625) was an English Quaker and writer.

== Life ==
Gargill was born in Swine, East Riding of Yorkshire around 1625.

It was said that in 1654 she swore allegiance to the founder of the Quakers George Fox greeting him as the "son of God".

She wrote "A Warning to all the World" and it was published by Giles Calvert in London in 1656. Later that year, in September, the same publisher published "A Brief Discovery of that which is Called the Popish Religion". This was after she had been to Lisbon where she had been questioned by the Inquisition and it was said that she started Quaker groups there. In 1657 she was in Amsterdam where the early Quakers there were troubled by her views and she formed a small schism.

She is known to have been alive in 1659 but her fate after that is unknown.
