= Meaux, East Riding of Yorkshire =

Hamlet in the East Riding of Yorkshire, England

Coordinates: 53.840656°N 0.333367°W

Meaux
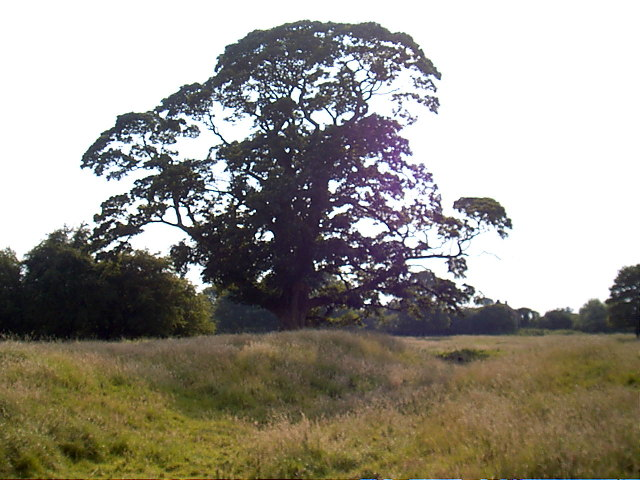
- Site of Meaux Abbey

- Location within the East Riding of Yorkshire
- OS grid reference: TA097395
  - London: 160 mi (260 km) S
- Civil parish: Wawne
- Unitary authority: East Riding of Yorkshire
- Ceremonial county: East Riding of Yorkshire
- Region: Yorkshire and the Humber
- Country: England
- Sovereign state: United Kingdom
- Post town: BEVERLEY
- Postcode district: HU17
- Dialling code: 01482
- Police: Humberside
- Fire: Humberside
- Ambulance: Yorkshire
- UK Parliament: Beverley and Holderness

Meaux (pronounced /mjus/ "mewss") is a hamlet and former civil parish, now in the parish of Wawne, in the East Riding of Yorkshire, England. It is about 6 1/2 miles (10 km) north of Hull city centre and 3 1/2 miles (6 km) east of Beverley. In 1931 the parish had a population of 73.

Meaux Abbey was a Cistercian Abbey near Meaux.

According to A Dictionary of British Place Names the name 'Meaux' is derived from Old Norse Mel-sǽr, meaning "Sandbank-pool".

Baines' History, Directory and Gazetteer of the County of York states that William the Conqueror gave the Meaux lordship to Gamel, who was born at Meaux in what is modern-day France, a name he gave to the Holderness settlement which he populated with his own people. However, the Domesday Book of 1086 records that in 1066 Ulf Fenman held the lordship, this transferring in 1086 to Drogo de la Beuvrière, who was also Tenant-in-chief to William I. Meaux is recorded in the Domesday Book as "Melse". At the time of the survey the settlement was in the Middle Hundred of Holderness in the East Riding of Yorkshire. Meaux contained 29 villagers, 5 smallholders, 6 freemen, and 4 men-at-arms. There were 53 ploughlands, woodland, and 274 acres (111 hectares) of meadow.

In 1823 Meaux was in the parish of Waghen (alternatively 'Wawn'), in the Wapentake and Liberty of Holderness. Baines states that the Cistercian Meaux Abbey was established in 1136, and that only remains of a brick mosaic pavement had been found within "extensive" moats or ditches. Meaux’s population at the time was 74, with occupations including five farmers & yeomen.

Meaux was formerly a township in the parish of Wawn, from 1866 Meaux was a civil parish in its own right, on 1 April 1935 the parish was abolished and merged with Wawne.

Mewes (also Mewis) is a fairly common family name in the North-East, and believed to be used by descendants of those who came to Yorkshire as soldiers commanded by Gamel.

== See also ==
- Listed buildings in Wawne
