= Listed buildings in Swine, East Riding of Yorkshire =

Swine is a civil parish in the county of the East Riding of Yorkshire, England. It contains three listed buildings that are recorded in the National Heritage List for England. Of these, one is listed at Grade I, the highest of the three grades, and the others are at Grade II, the lowest grade. The parish contains the village of Swine, the hamlet of Benningholme, and the surrounding countryside. The listed buildings consist of a church, a village cross and a house.

== Key ==
Grade	Criteria
I	Buildings of exceptional interest, sometimes considered to be internationally important
II	Buildings of national importance and special interest

== Buildings ==
Name and location	Photograph	Date	Notes	Grade
St Mary's Church; 53.80635°N 0.27908°W		c. 1180	The church has been altered and extended through the centuries, including a restoration in 1872 by Ewan Christian. It is built in magnesian limestone with a Welsh slate roof, and consists of a nave with a clerestory, north and south aisles, a south porch, a chancel with a south vestry and a north aisle chapel, and a west tower. The tower has three stages, a plinth, diagonal buttresses, a two-light pointed west window, slit windows, bands, a clock face, and two-light bell openings with Y-tracery, above which is a cornice, and an embattled parapet with corner pinnacles.	I
Village cross 53.80583°N 0.27338°W		Medieval	The village cross is in stone, and has a square base, and a broken square shaft with chamfered corners.	II
Benningholme Hall; 53.83274°N 0.28941°W		c. 1820–30	The house is in Gault brick on a stone plinth, with dressings in orange brick and stone, a sill band, overhanging eaves, a hipped Welsh slate roof, and a double range plan. The main block has two storeys and five bays, and a recessed two-storey single-bay wing on the left. In the centre is an Ionic porch with paired columns, a frieze with paterae, a cornice and a blocking course, and a doorway with a segmental fanlight with decorative glazing. On the recessed left bay is a doorway with a fanlight under a flat arch of gauged brick. The windows are sashes with margin lights, under flat arches of orange gauged brick, those on the ground floor in elliptically arched recesses. The garden front has six bays, two of which are bowed and contain curved sash windows, and there is an ornate cast iron verandah.	II
