= Burton Constable railway station =

Disused railway station in Burton Constable, East Riding of Yorkshire, England

Burton Constable
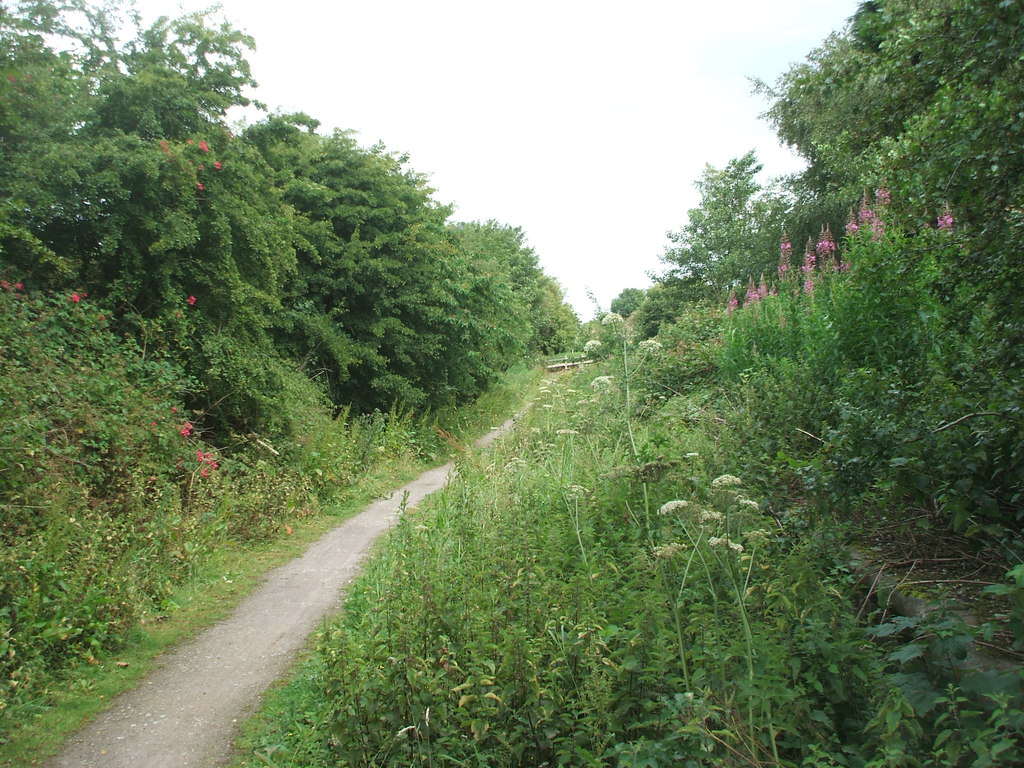
- Site of the former station in 2009

General information
- Location: New Ellerby, East Riding of Yorkshire; England
- Coordinates: 53.8380°N 0.2250°W
- Grid reference: TA168394
- Platforms: 2

Other information
- Status: Closed

History
- Original company: Hull and Hornsea Railway
- Pre-grouping: North Eastern Railway
- Post-grouping: London and North Eastern Railway

Key dates
- 28 March 1864: Opened as Marton
- 1 August 1864: Renamed Burton Constable
- 1 January 1922: Renamed Ellerby
- 19 October 1964: Closed
Location

Burton Constable railway station was a railway station which served the villages of Marton and Burton Constable in the East Riding of Yorkshire, England. It was on the Hull and Hornsea Railway.

It opened on 28 March 1864 as "Marton", but was renamed "Burton Constable" on 1 August 1864, to avoid confusion with various other Martons elsewhere. It was renamed again (to avoid confusion with Constable Burton on the Wensleydale Railway), on 1 January 1922 and became known as "Ellerby". It closed following the Beeching Report on 19 October 1964.

Preceding station	Disused railways	Following station
Ellerby-1st station	North Eastern Railway; Hull and Hornsea Railway	Whitedale
