= William Dighton =

Medieval English clerk

William Dighton was a medieval English clerk in the Privy seal and briefly Keeper of the Privy seal.

== Early life and career ==
He was the illegitimate son of a priest. He served as a clerk in the Privy Seal office from 1356 to 1394 under Edward III and Richard II. For a short time, (1381–1382), he was promoted to Keeper of the Privy Seal. He was displaced from the position by a superior candidate in Walter Skirclaw, later Bishop of Coventry and Lichfield, after which Dighton resumed his previous role as a clerk.

The circumstances of his birth required him to seek papal dispensation to take holy orders and to confirm each appointment. He became, however, rector of Trimmington, Norfolk, parson of Barking, Suffolk and Ash, near Wrotham, Kent. He exchanged the latter living for that of Wybarton in Lincolnshire.

Political offices
Preceded by John Fordham	Keeper of the Privy Seal; 1381–1382	Succeeded by Walter Skirclaw
