= Hornsea Rail Trail =

Rail trail in the East Riding of Yorkshire, England

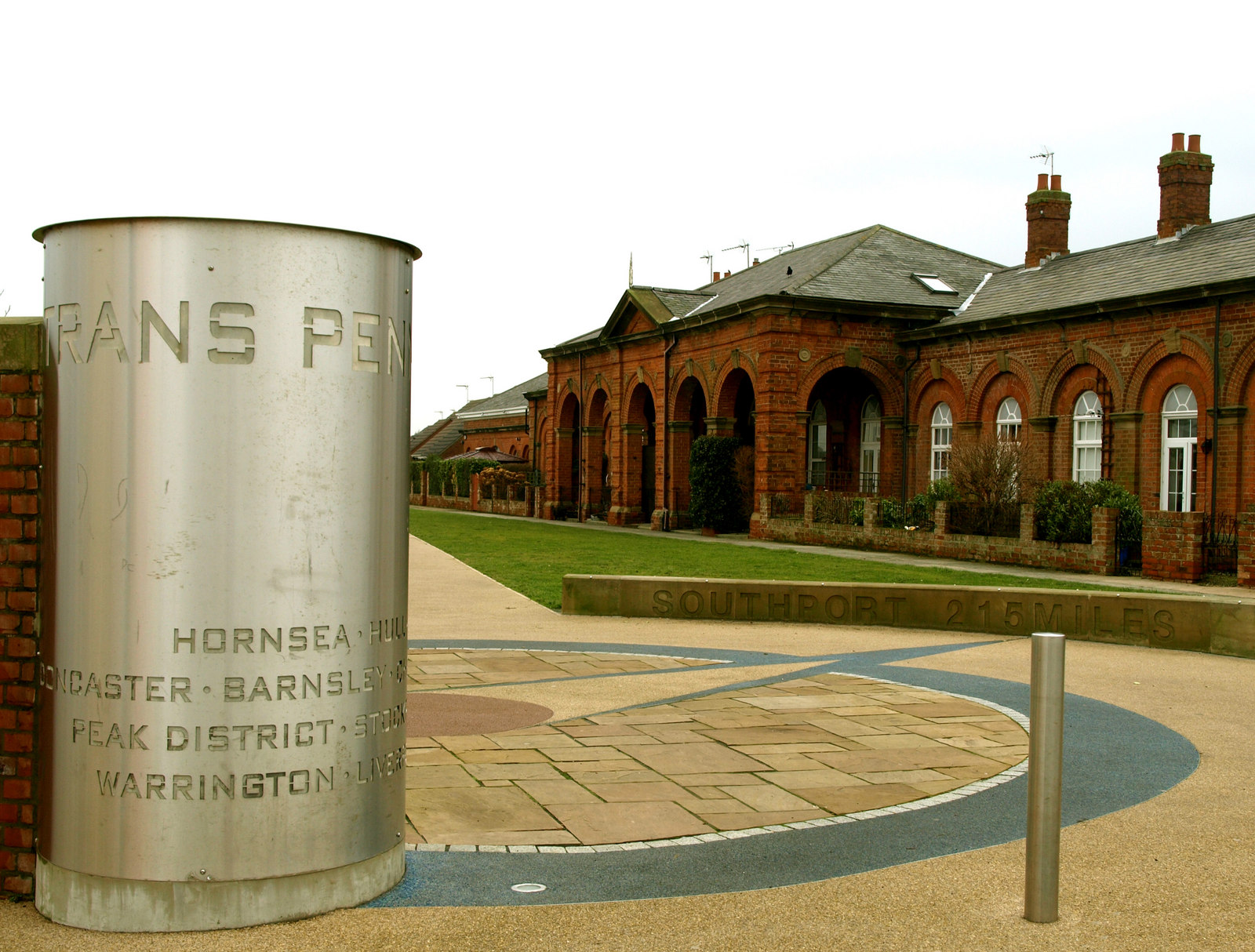
Start at the former Hornsea railway station

Hornsea Rail Trail is a public footpath, cycleway and bridleway which follows the route of the old Hull and Hornsea Railway in the East Riding of Yorkshire, England. It forms the eastern part of the Trans Pennine Trail.

== Coordinates ==
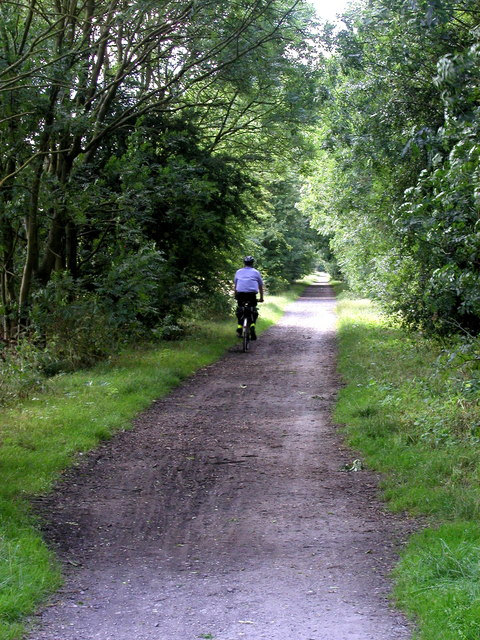
The trail near Ellerby

Point	Coordinates (Links to map resources)	OS Grid Ref	Notes
Hornsea	53.9114°N 0.1628°W	SE799473	End point
New Ellerby	53.8380°N 0.2261°W	TA168394	
Skirlaugh picnic site	53.8209°N 0.2495°W	TA153374	
Sutton-on-Hull	53.7819°N 0.3072°W	TA116330	
Railway line	53.7583°N 0.3228°W	TA106304	Take right fork just after bridge
Sykes Street, Hull	53.7494°N 0.3242°W	TA106294	Start point (Note: East Riding of Yorkshire Council start point varies from this.)
