= Listed buildings in Withernwick =

Withernwick is a civil parish in the county of the East Riding of Yorkshire, England. It contains two listed buildings that are recorded in the National Heritage List for England. Both the listed buildings are designated at Grade II, the lowest of the three grades, which is applied to "buildings of national importance and special interest". The parish contains the village of Withernwick and the surrounding area. Both the listed buildings are in the village, and consist of a house and a church.

== Buildings ==
Name and location	Photograph	Date	Notes
Withernwick Hall; 53.85219°N 0.18220°W		Mid to late 18th century	The house is in pinkish-brown brick, with a modillion cornice, and a pantile roof with brick copings and tumbled-in brick to the gable ends. There are two storeys and an L-shaped plan, with a main range of five bays, and another range on the right. The central doorway has pilasters, a fanlight, and an open pediment. The windows on the front are sashes under painted flat rubbed brick arches, and on the right gable end are two casement windows.
St Alban's Church; 53.84683°N 0.18733°W		1855	The church was rebuilt by Mallinson and Healey, incorporating earlier materials. It is in banded pebble and reddish-brown brick, with stone dressings and a Welsh slate roof. The church consists of a nave, a south aisle, a south porch, a chancel and a north vestry. On the east end of the nave is a gabled bell turret.
