= Ellerby railway station =

Disused railway station in Ellerby, East Riding of Yorkshire, England

Ellerby
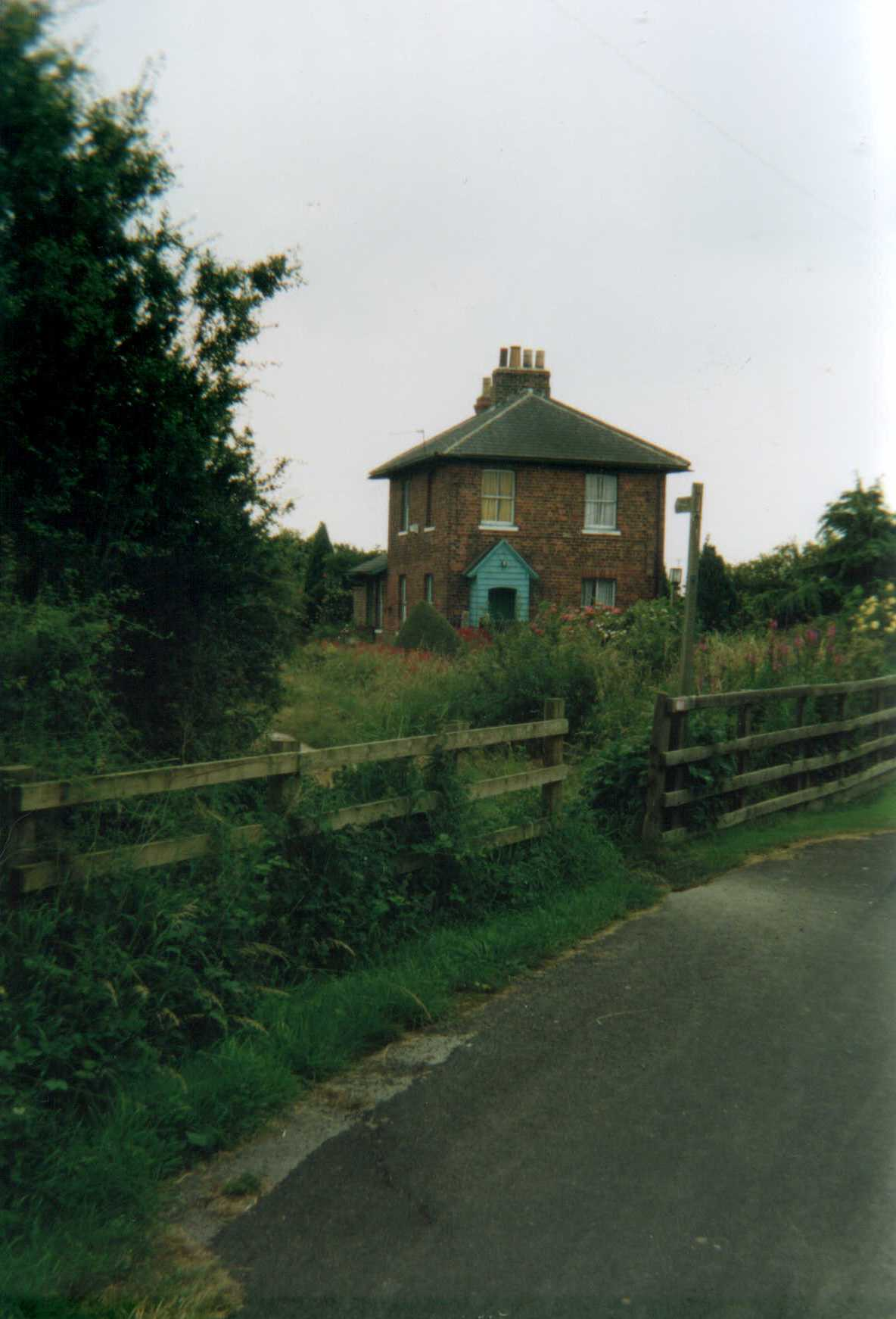

General information
- Location: Old Ellerby, East Riding of Yorkshire; England
- Coordinates: 53.8290°N 0.2363°W
- Grid reference: TA161384
- Platforms: 2

Other information
- Status: Closed

History
- Opened: 28 March 1864
- Closed: 1 July 1902
- Original company: Hull and Hornsea Railway
- Pre-grouping: North Eastern Railway (UK)
Location

Ellerby railway station refers to either of two disused stations on the Hull and Hornsea Railway. They served the village of Old Ellerby in the East Riding of Yorkshire, England.

The first station to be named "Ellerby" opened in September 1864. It was a market station with trains only stopping on Tuesdays. Ellerby closed to passengers in July 1902, but it remained in use for goods as "Ellerby Siding". "Ellerby Siding" was renamed as "Weelerby West Siding" in July 1923. Weelerby West Siding closed completely on 7 April 1959.

The second "Ellerby" station (see Burton Constable railway station) opened on 28 March 1864 as "Marton" but it was renamed "Burton Constable" in August of the same year. Because this could be confused with Constable Burton railway station in North Yorkshire, the name was changed again, at the start of 1922, to "Ellerby". Ellerby's goods service ceased on 11 November 1963 and passenger services ended on 19 October 1964.

Preceding station	Disused railways	Following station
Skirlaugh	North Eastern Railway; Hull and Hornsea Railway	Burton Constable
