= Listed buildings in Ellerby, East Riding of Yorkshire =

Ellerby is a civil parish in the county of the East Riding of Yorkshire, England. It contains three listed buildings that are recorded in the National Heritage List for England. All the listed buildings are designated at Grade II, the lowest of the three grades, which is applied to "buildings of national importance and special interest". The parish contains the hamlets of New Ellerby and Old Ellerby and the surrounding countryside, and the listed buildings consist of two houses and a farmhouse.

== Buildings ==
Name and location	Photograph	Date	Notes
Wood Hall Farmhouse; 53.81423°N 0.22654°W	—	Mid-18th century	The farmhouse is in pinkish-red brick, with red brick dressings, floor bands in the outer bays, stepped eaves, and a swept tile roof with brick copings. There are two storeys, a T-shaped plan, and a front range of five bays, the middle bay projecting slightly. In the centre is a doorway with an architrave, a fanlight, and a flat arch, and the windows are sashes under flat arches of red gauged brick.
Wood Hall; 53.81113°N 0.22474°W	—	1829	The house is in grey brick on a plinth, with overhanging eaves, paired modillions, hipped Welsh slate roofs, and three bays. The left bay is a cylindrical three-storey tower, the other two bays have two storeys, the right bay projecting and pedimented. On the tower is a porch with a doorway in a moulded architrave, with a fanlight and a hood mould. Above is a floor band, and an oculus. On the garden front is a full-height canted bay window. The windows throughout are sashes under flat brick arches.
Langthorpe Hall; 53.84037°N 0.23309°W		c. 1830	The house is in gault brick on the south and west fronts, and in red brick elsewhere, on a plinth, with stone dressings, paired gutter brackets, and a hipped Welsh slate roof. There are two storeys and four bays, and a rear outshut. The doorway has pilasters and a decorative fanlight. The windows are sashes with channelled wedge lintels and keystones.
