= Listed buildings in Skirlaugh =

Skirlaugh is a civil parish in the county of the East Riding of Yorkshire, England. It contains five listed buildings that are recorded in the National Heritage List for England. Of these, one is listed at Grade I, the highest of the three grades, and the others are at Grade II, the lowest grade. The parish contains the village of Skirlaugh and the surrounding countryside. The listed buildings consist of a church, a former workhouse and houses.

== Key ==
Grade	Criteria
I	Buildings of exceptional interest, sometimes considered to be internationally important
II	Buildings of national importance and special interest

== Buildings ==
Name and location	Photograph	Date	Notes	Grade
St Augustine's Church; 53.84109°N 0.26643°W		c. 1401	The church is built in limestone and is in Perpendicular style. It consists of a nave and a chancel in one unit, a south porch, a north vestry, and a west tower. The tower has three stages, a chamfered plinth with a quatrefoil band, diagonal buttresses rising to crocketed pinnacles, bands, and a pointed three-light west window with a hood mould. In the middle stage is a niche containing a statue, and the bell openings have pointed heads and two trefoil-headed lights, above which is a band with fleurons and gargoyles, and pierced, traceried and crocketed battlements with crocketed pinnacles. On the nave and chancel are embattled parapets, and between the bays are buttresses rising to pinnacles with crocketed finials. The windows have pointed heads and three lights, and the east windows has five lights.	I
Southernwood; 53.83222°N 0.25673°W		Late 18th century	The house is in pinkish-yellow brick, with stone dressings, and a tile roof with tumbled-in brick to the gable ends, brick copings and stone kneelers. There are two storeys, five bays and rear ranges. The central doorway has pilasters, a fanlight, consoles and a hood. The windows are sashes under channelled wedge lintels with keystones.	II
Springfield House; 53.84258°N 0.26335°W	—	Late 18th century	The farmhouse is in colourwashed brick with a hipped Welsh slate roof. There is a T-shaped plan, with a main range of two storeys and four bays, and a projecting two-bay range on the right. On the front is a Doric porch with two columns and pilaster responds, a frieze, a cornice and a blocking course. The doorway has a fanlight with radial glazing. The windows are sashes under channelled wedge lintels with keystones.	II
Hazlemere Farmhouse; 53.83664°N 0.25815°W		Early 19th century	The farmhouse is in reddish-brown brick with a hipped Welsh slate roof. There are two storeys, and an L-shaped plan, with a front range of three bays, and a three-bay rear wing. The central doorway has pilasters, a fanlight, a frieze, and a hood on consoles. The windows are sashes under cambered heads.	II
Rowton Villas; 53.84335°N 0.27291°W		1838	Originally a workhouse, later used for other purposes, the building is in pinkish-brown brick on a plinth, with dressings in gauged brick and stone, a sill band, a stuccoed frieze, overhanging eaves and a hipped Welsh slate roof. There is an approximately U-shaped plan, with a main range of two storeys and seven bays, lower recessed two-storey three-bay wings, and rear ranges. The outer bays project slightly under pediments. In the centre is a projecting gabled porch with a round-arched entrance, moulded bargeboards, and a doorway with a fanlight. The windows are sashes, those on the ground floor with round arches of gauged brick, radial glazing and recessed aprons. The outer bays have a two-storey round-arched recess containing sash windows, on the upper floor round-headed with impost bands.	II
