= Sigglesthorne railway station =

Disused railway station in Great Hatfield, East Riding of Yorkshire, England

Sigglesthorne
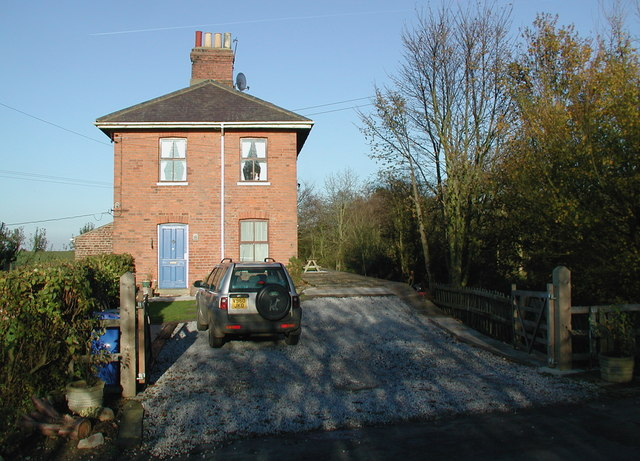

General information
- Location: Great Hatfield, East Riding of Yorkshire; England
- Coordinates: 53.870200°N 0.206800°W
- Grid reference: TA180430
- Platforms: 2

Other information
- Status: Closed

History
- Original company: Hull and Hornsea Railway
- Pre-grouping: North Eastern Railway
- Post-grouping: London and North Eastern Railway; North Eastern Region of British Railways

Key dates
- 28 March 1864: Opened as "Hatfield"
- 1 October 1874: Renamed "Sigglesthorne"
- 19 October 1964: Closed
Location

Sigglesthorne railway station was a railway station that served the villages of Great Hatfield, Little Hatfield and Sigglesthorne in the East Riding of Yorkshire, England. It was on the Hull and Hornsea Railway.

It opened on 28 March 1864, and was originally named "Hatfield". It was renamed (to avoid confusion with Hatfield on the East Coast Main Line), on 1 October 1874, and closed following the Beeching Report on 19 October 1964.

A section of the disused railway line is now a local nature reserve.

Preceding station	Disused railways	Following station
Whitedale	North Eastern Railway; Hull and Hornsea Railway	Wassand

== Other sources ==
- Butt, R. V. J. (October 1995). The Directory of Railway Stations: details every public and private passenger station, halt, platform and stopping place, past and present (1st ed.). Sparkford: Patrick Stephens Ltd. ISBN 978-1-85260-508-7. OCLC 60251199. OL 11956311M.
- "Station Name: Sigglesthorne". Disused Stations. Subterranea Britannica. 20 April 2010.
