= Sutton-on-Hull =

Suburb of Kingston upon Hull, East Riding of Yorkshire, England

Coordinates: 53.780585°N 0.304695°W

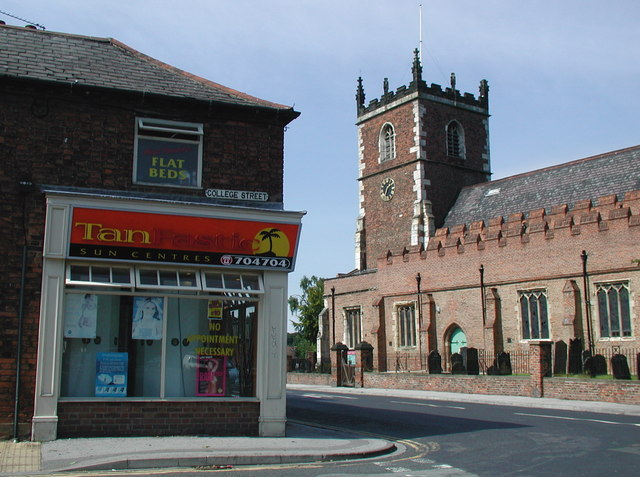
- St James' Church

- Location within the East Riding of Yorkshire
- Population: 12,649 2011 census
- OS grid reference: TA117326
- Unitary authority: Kingston upon Hull
- Ceremonial county: East Riding of Yorkshire
- Region: Yorkshire and the Humber
- Country: England
- Sovereign state: United Kingdom
- Post town: HULL
- Postcode district: HU8
- Dialling code: 01482
- Police: Humberside
- Fire: Humberside
- Ambulance: Yorkshire
- UK Parliament: Kingston upon Hull North

Sutton-on-Hull (also known as Sutton-in-Holderness) is a suburb of the city of Kingston upon Hull, in the ceremonial county of the East Riding of Yorkshire, England. It is located 3 miles (4.8 km) north east of the city centre and has the B1237 road running through it which connects the A165 road with the A1033.

== History ==
Sutton is mentioned in the Domesday Book as having 20 households and being chiefly owned by the Archbishop of York. Its name in the book is Sudtone which is Anglo-Saxon in origin and means Southern farmstead. The village acquired its name as the western part of the manor of Sutton was bordered by the River Hull. The area sits on a ridge of land between 13 feet (4 m) and 36 feet (11 m) high in a flat landscape; Hull City Council describes the area as having the only appreciable hills within the city limits. The village was also in its own parish which developed alongside, but separate from the nearby town of Hull. On 31 December 1894 the parish of "Sutton Without" was formed from the rural part of Sutton and Stoneferry, the southern part of the village became part of the Municipal Borough of Hull, on 25 March 1898 Sutton Without parish was renamed "Sutton on Hull" with the whole settlement becoming a suburb of the enlarged borough of Kingston upon Hull in 1929, on 1 April 1935 the parish was abolished and merged with Sculcoates and Wawne. In 1931 the parish had a population of 196.

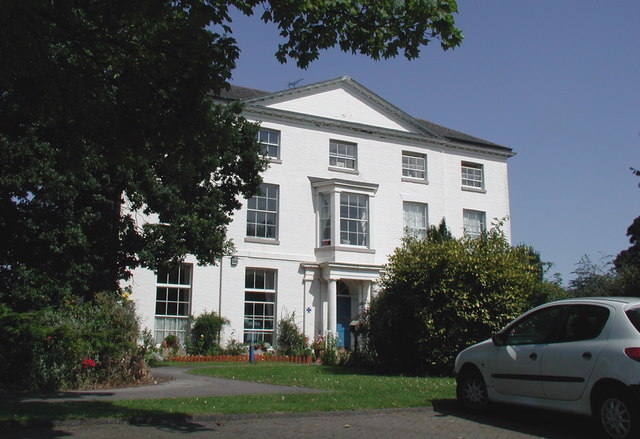
Sutton House

The church (dedicated to St James) was designated a grade I listed building in 1952 and is now recorded in the National Heritage List for England, maintained by Historic England. A chapel existed on the site since at least 1160.

This was rebuilt extensively between 1347 and 1349, when it was consecrated at St James' Church. The chancel of the church is the only substantial structure in the area that was constructed from stone; all other buildings used locally produced brick on account of there being no locally quarried stone available. The stones were moved up the River Hull to Stoneferry and then manoeuvred up the Antholme Dyke to Sutton.

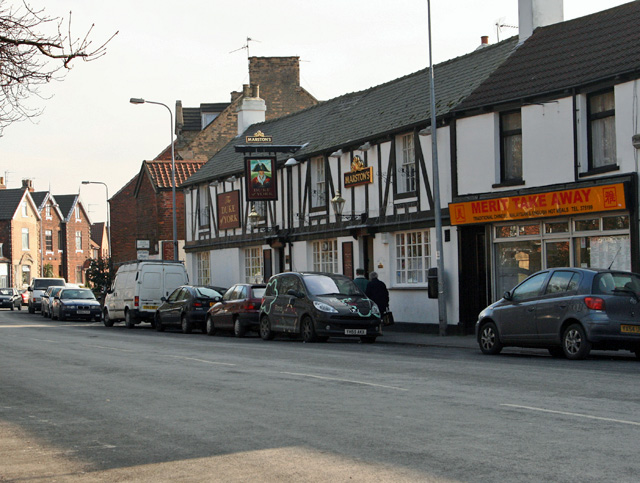
The Duke of York

It was served by Sutton-on-Hull railway station on the Hull and Holderness Railway until 1964. The formation that the railway took through the village is now the Hornsea Rail Trail and forms part of the Trans Pennine Trail.

Between 1939 and 1961, the Royal Air Force had a base in the area, RAF Sutton on Hull, which did not have a runway. Initially the site was used as a balloon barrage training and storage site, but it also had a fighter control unit and the RAF School of fire-fighting for 16 years between 1943 and 1959.

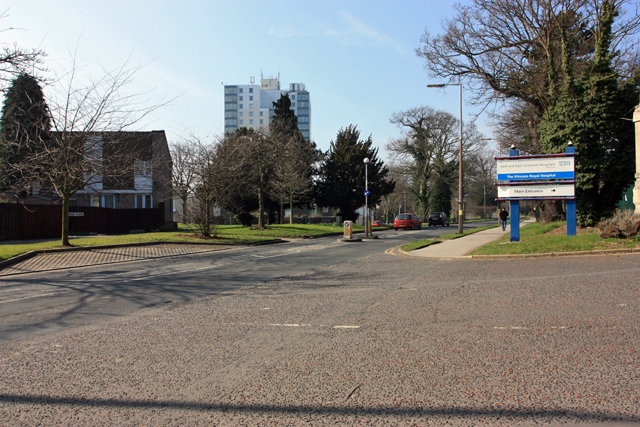
Saltshouse Road

The Bransholme Estate has been built on the former RAF site.

The population of the ward in Sutton was 12,881 at the 2001 census. This had dropped slightly to 12,649 by the time of the 2011 census.

The Sutton & Wawne Museum, is inside The Old School, formerly the St James' Church of England School until 1977. It is now a local folk and social history museum, and family history research centre, serving the whole area of both historic parishes of St James' in Sutton, and St Peter's at Wawne. The Old School building is Grade II listed, c. 1859, and is the oldest educational building in Hull still used for educational purposes. Museum within has been open since 1999, run entirely by volunteers. Admission free; open every Friday, 10 am - 2 pm.

== Notable people ==
- Architect and antiquarian Thomas Blashill (1830–1905) was born in Sutton, and wrote a history of the district.

== See also ==
- Grade I listed churches in the East Riding of Yorkshire
- Listed buildings in Kingston upon Hull (Ings Ward)
- Listed buildings in Kingston upon Hull (Sutton Ward)
