= Skirlaugh railway station =

Disused railway station in Skirlaugh, East Riding of Yorkshire, England

Skirlaugh
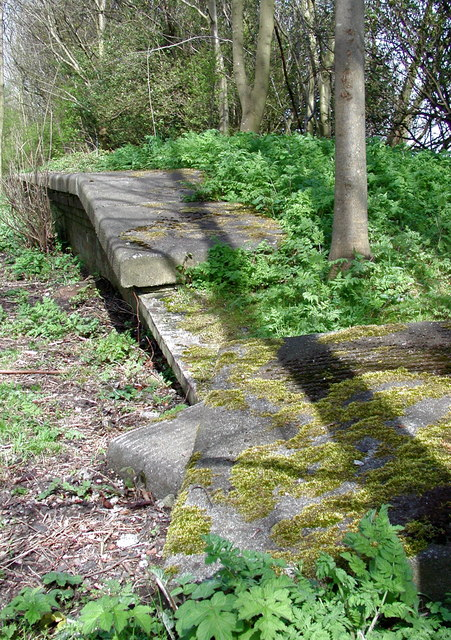

General information
- Location: Skirlaugh, East Riding of Yorkshire; England
- Coordinates: 53.820900°N 0.249500°W
- Grid reference: TA154375
- Platforms: 2

Other information
- Status: Closed

History
- Pre-grouping: Hull and Hornsea Railway; NER
- Post-grouping: LNER; Eastern Region of British Railways

Key dates
- 28 March 1864: Opened
- 6 May 1957: Closed
Location

Skirlaugh railway station was a railway station that served the village of Skirlaugh in the East Riding of Yorkshire, England. It was on the Hull and Hornsea Railway.

It opened on 28 March 1864, and closed on 6 May 1957.

Preceding station	Disused railways	Following station
Swine	North Eastern Railway; Hull and Hornsea Railway	Ellerby
