= John Bigland =

- Born: 1750; Skirlaugh, East Riding of Yorkshire, England
- Died: 23 February 1832 (aged 81–82); Finningley, South Yorkshire, England
- Occupations: Historian and schoolmaster

John Bigland (1750 – 22 February 1832) was an English schoolmaster and later a historian.

== Early life and education ==
He was born of poor parents at Skirlaugh in the Holderness area of the East Riding of Yorkshire.

== Career ==
Bigland began his career as a village schoolmaster. In 1803, he published his first work occasioned, on his own account, by his religious scepticism. His work was a success, and he became a professional author, publishing in rapid succession a series of popular books, mainly connected with geography and history.

== Works ==
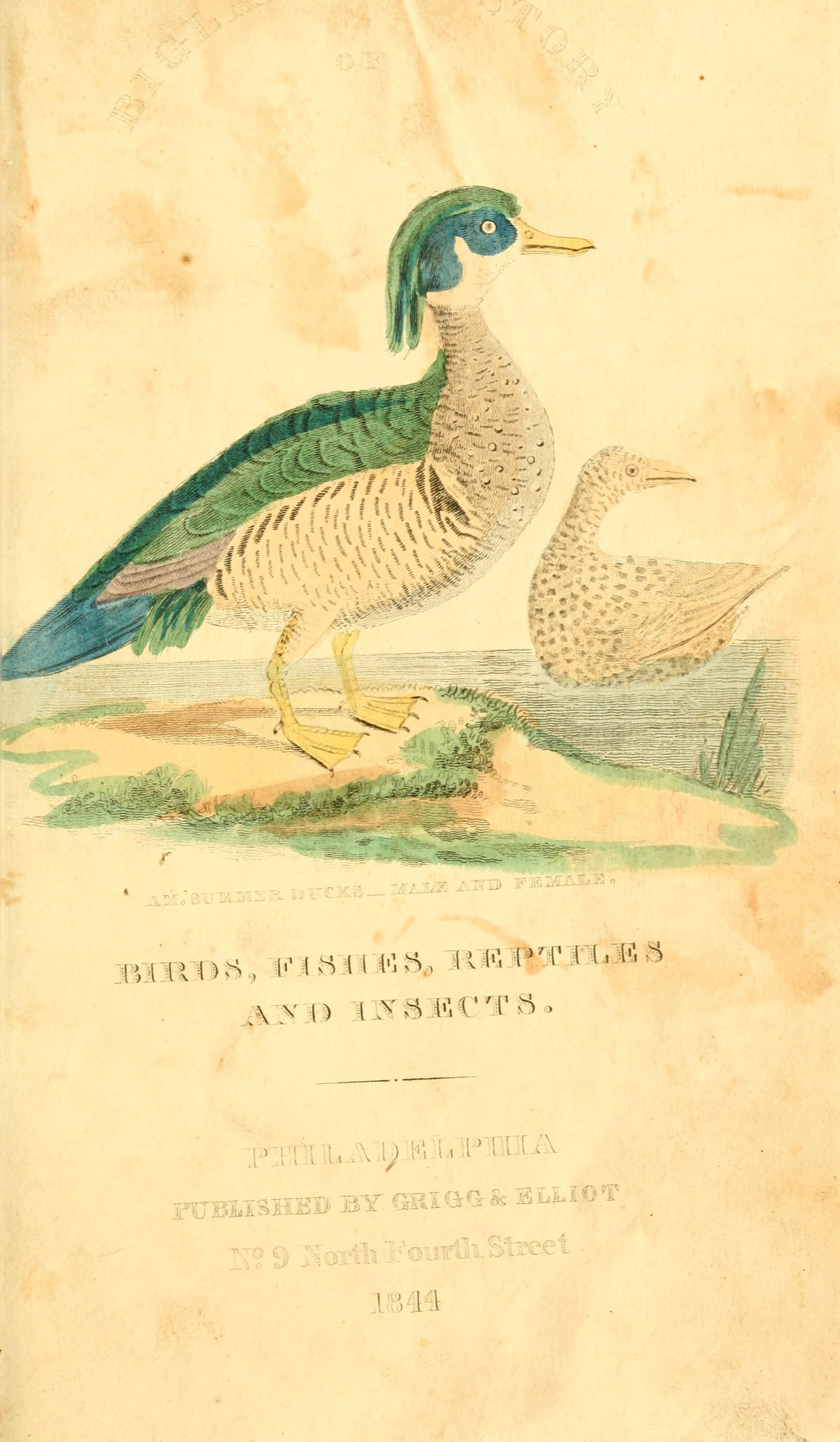
A natural history of birds, fishes, reptiles, and insects

He was the author of articles in magazines; of a continuation to April 1808 of George Lyttelton, 1st Baron Lyttelton's History of England in a Series of Letters from a Nobleman to his Son; and of an addition of the period of George III to Oliver Goldsmith's History of England. His other works include:

- Reflections on the Resurrection and Ascension of Christ (1803)
- Letters on the Study and Use of Ancient and Modern History (1804)
- Letters on the Modern History and Political Aspect of Europe (1804)
- Essays on Various Subjects (1805), two volumes
- Letters on Natural History (1806)
- A Geographical and Historical View of the World, Exhibiting a Complete Delineation of the Natural and Artificial Features of Each Country, &c. (1810), five volumes
- A History of Spain from the Earliest Period to the Close of the Year 1809 (1810); translated and continued by Le Comte Mathieu Dumas to the epoch of the Restoration (1814), two volumes
- A Sketch of the History of Europe from the Year 1783 to the Present Time (1811); in a later edition continued to 1814 (translated, and augmented in the military part, and continued to 1819 by Jacques W. MacCarthy, Paris, 1819), two volumes
- The Philosophical Wanderers, or the History of the Roman Tribune and the Priestess of Minerva, Exhibiting the Vicissitudes That Diversify the Fortunes of Nations and Individuals (1811)
- Yorkshire, being the 16th volume of the Beauties of England and Wales (1812)
- A History of England from the Earliest Period to the Close of the War, 1814 (1815) two volumes
- A System of Geography for the Use of Schools and Private Students (1816)
- An Historical Display of the Effects of Physical and Moral Causes on the Character and Circumstances of Nations, Including a Comparison of the Ancients and Moderns in Regard to Their Intellectual and Social State (1816)
- Letters on English History for the Use of Schools (1817)
- Letters on French History for the Use of Schools (1818)
- A Compendious History of the Jews (1820)
- Memoirs (1830)

== Personal life ==
Towards the end of his life, Bigland resided at Finningley, near Doncaster, South Yorkshire. He died, age eighty-two, in Finningley.

== See also ==
- List of historians by area of study
- List of people from Yorkshire
