= Ellerby Area Hoard =

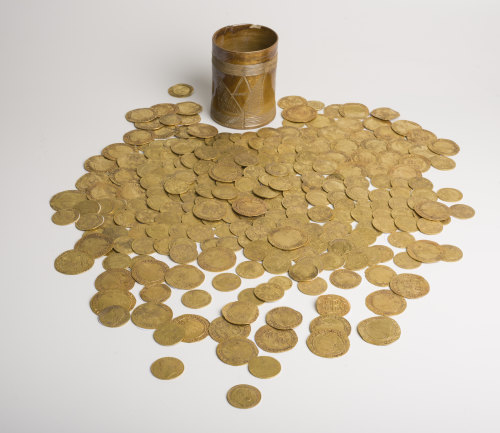
- The Ellerby Area Hoard
- Material: gold ceramic
- Size: 266 gold coins
- Created: circa 1727 (deposited)
- Period/culture: Georgian
- Discovered: 2020; Ellerby, East Riding of Yorkshire, England
- Present location: Distributed within private collections
- Identification: YORYM-18E848

The Ellerby Area Hoard or Ellerby Hoard is a hoard of 266 17th-18th century gold coins found in a manganese-mottled salt-glazed stoneware vessel in a house in Ellerby, East Riding of Yorkshire in 2019.

== Discovery and contents ==
The hoard was discovered during renovations of an 18th century property beneath the kitchen floor. The 266 gold coins were found packed within a stoneware vessel tax-stamped to the reign of Queen Anne (1702-1714). The vessel was nearly complete, manganese-mottled salt-glazed and decorated with ridged geometric markings. There are coins of several different monarchs represented within the hoard: James VI and I (1603–1625, 34 coins), Charles I (1625–1649, 42 coins), Charles II (1660–1685, 25 coins), James II (1685–1688, 14 coins), William and Mary (1688–1694, 10 coins), William III (1695–1702, 25 coins), Anne (1702–1714, 31 coins), George I (1714–1727, 84 coins), and Joao V of Portugal (1706–1750, 1 coin). The latest coin in the hoard is a guinea of George I dating to 1727. The coins would be worth approximately £100,000 in modern monetary values.

== Sale ==
The hoard met the stipulations of the Treasure Act 1996 and was declared Treasure but subsequently disclaimed. The hoard was arranged for sale by Spink & Son at 16:00 on 7 October 2022. The hoard was sold to private collectors for a total hammer price of £628,000 with a final purchase price including fees of £754,000.
