= Ellerby, East Riding of Yorkshire =

Civil parish in the East Riding of Yorkshire, England

Coordinates: 53°50′N 0°14′W

Ellerby
- Civil parish
- Population: 365 (2011 census)
- OS grid reference: TA162389
- Civil parish: Ellerby
- Unitary authority: East Riding of Yorkshire
- Ceremonial county: East Riding of Yorkshire
- Region: Yorkshire and the Humber
- Country: England
- Sovereign state: United Kingdom
- Post town: HULL
- Postcode district: HU11
- Dialling code: 01964
- Police: Humberside
- Fire: Humberside
- Ambulance: Yorkshire
- UK Parliament: Beverley and Holderness

Ellerby is a civil parish in the East Riding of Yorkshire, England. It is situated 8 miles (13 km) to the north-east of Hull city centre and covering an area of 924.853 hectares (2,285.36 acres).

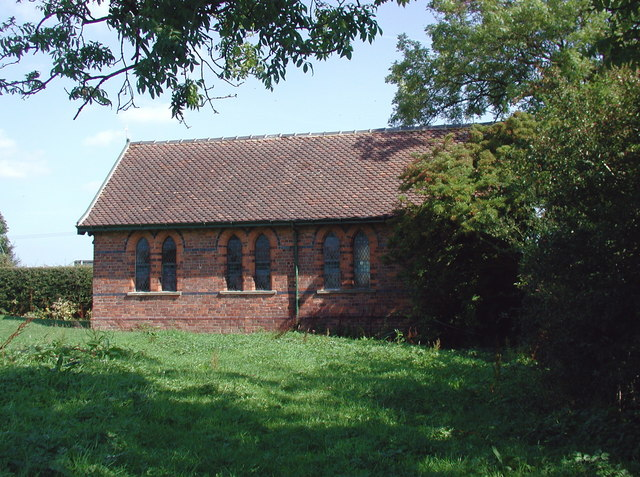
St James Church, Old Ellerby

The civil parish is formed by the hamlets of New Ellerby and Old Ellerby. According to the 2011 UK census, Ellerby parish had a population of 365, a decrease on the 2001 UK census figure of 393.

In 2020 the Ellerby Area Hoard was found during building renovations in a house in Ellerby parish. It is a hoard of 266 17th-18th century gold coins found in a stoneware vessel.

== See also ==
- Listed buildings in Ellerby, East Riding of Yorkshire
