= Sutton-on-Hull railway station =

Disused railway station in Sutton-on-Hull, East Riding of Yorkshire, England

Sutton-on-Hull
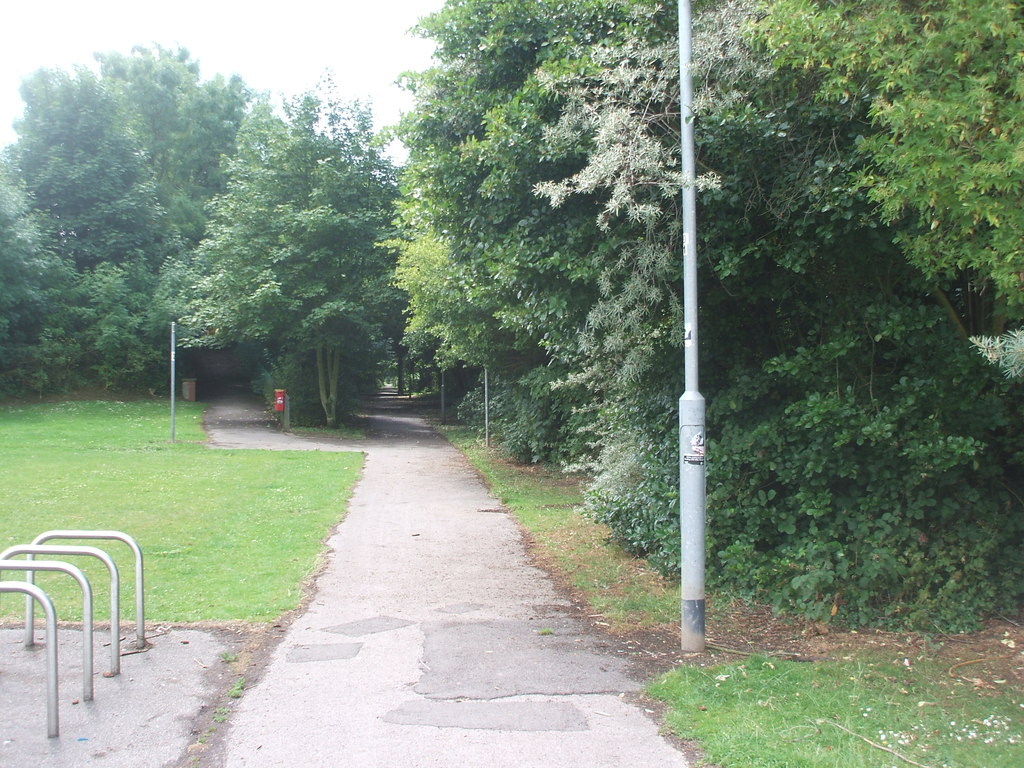
- Site of the former station (2009)

General information
- Location: Sutton-on-Hull, East Riding of Yorkshire; England
- Coordinates: 53.781900°N 0.307200°W
- Grid reference: TA116330
- Platforms: 2

Other information
- Status: Closed

History
- Original company: Hull and Hornsea Railway
- Pre-grouping: North Eastern Railway (UK)

Key dates
- 1864: opened as Sutton
- 1874: renamed Sutton-on-Hull
- 1964: closed
Location

Sutton-on-Hull railway station was a railway station that served the village of Sutton-on-Hull in the East Riding of Yorkshire, England. It was on the Hull and Hornsea Railway.

The station opened on 28 March 1864, and was originally named "Sutton", on 1 December 1874 the station became "Sutton-on-Hull". The station closed following the Beeching Report on 19 October 1964 and the station building was demolished; the station-master's house is still extant and is a private residence.

Preceding station	Disused railways	Following station
Wilmington	North Eastern Railway; Hull and Hornsea Railway	Swine
