= John Fordham (bishop) =

Bishop and Treasurer of England (died 1425)

- Bishop of Ely
- Appointed: 3 April 1388
- Term ended: 19 November 1425
- Predecessor: Thomas Arundel
- Successor: Philip Morgan
- Previous post: Bishop of Durham

Orders
- Consecration: 5 January 1382

Personal details
- Died: 19 November 1425
- Denomination: Catholic

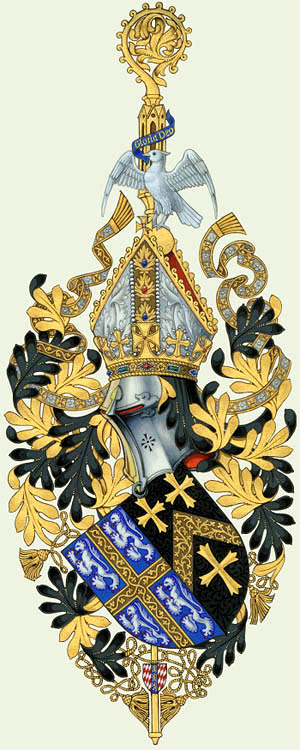
John Fordham's personal arms are impaled with those of his bishopric

John Fordham (died 1425) was Bishop of Durham and Bishop of Ely. Fordham was keeper of the privy seal of Prince Richard from 1376 to 1377 and Dean of Wells before being named Lord Privy Seal in June 1377. He held that office until December 1381.

Fordham was nominated to Durham on 9 September 1381 and consecrated on 5 January 1382. He was translated to Ely on 3 April 1388.

Fordham briefly served as Lord High Treasurer in 1386.

In 1407 Fordham appointed Maurice Plank to be master of the Grammar Scholars in Wisbech. The bishops of Ely were for many years the official Visitors to Wisbech Grammar School which claims to date to 1379.

Fordham died on 19 November 1425. His executors, listed in 1430, were Robert Wetheryngsete, John Bernard, William Derby, Thomas Reynald and Robert Crowe.

== Citations ==
Political offices
Preceded by Nicholas Carew	Lord Privy Seal; 1377–1381	Succeeded by William Dighton
Preceded by Hugh Segrave	Lord High Treasurer; 1386	Succeeded by John Gilbert
Catholic Church titles
Preceded by Thomas Hatfield	Bishop of Durham; 1381–1388	Succeeded by Walter Skirlaw
Preceded by Thomas Arundel	Bishop of Ely; 1388–1425	Succeeded by Philip Morgan
