= Wawne =

Village and civil parish in the East Riding of Yorkshire, England

Coordinates: 53.816742°N 0.346088°W

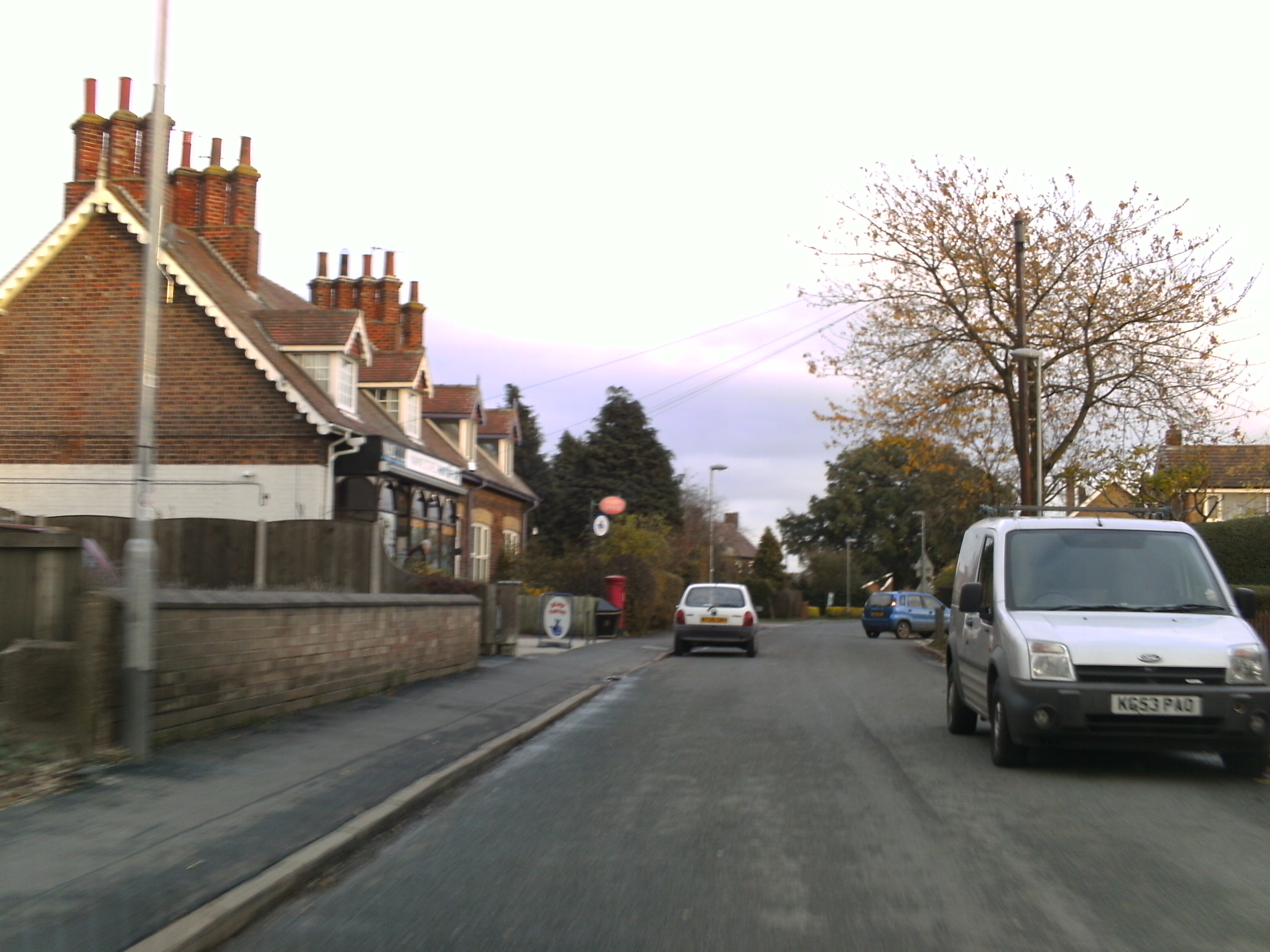
- Main Street Wawne with the Post Office to the left

- Location within the East Riding of Yorkshire
- Population: 975 (2011 census)
- OS grid reference: TA089368
- Civil parish: Wawne
- Unitary authority: East Riding of Yorkshire
- Ceremonial county: East Riding of Yorkshire
- Region: Yorkshire and the Humber
- Country: England
- Sovereign state: United Kingdom
- Post town: HULL
- Postcode district: HU7
- Dialling code: 01482
- Police: Humberside
- Fire: Humberside
- Ambulance: Yorkshire
- UK Parliament: Beverley and Holderness

Wawne /ˈwɔːn/, also spelled Waghen, is a small village and civil parish in the East Riding of Yorkshire, England. The village is situated approximately 5.5 miles (8.9 km) north of Hull city centre and 4 miles (6.4 km) south-east of Beverley on the east bank of the River Hull.

The civil parish consists of the village of Wawne and the hamlet of Meaux. According to the 2011 UK census, Wawne parish had a population of 975, an increase on the 2001 UK census figure of 878.

== History ==
Wawne is first mentioned (as Wagene) in the Domesday Book in 1086. The name is from an assumed Old English word wagen, meaning "shaking" (probably connected with Modern English "wag" or the dialect "quag"), and is therefore believed to mean "shaking ground" or "quagmire".

In the early Middle Ages Wawne was a very large parish, including Sutton-on-Hull and Stoneferry. Sutton became a separate parish some time in the Middle Ages.

In 1155, Stephen the son of William, Earl of Aumale, confirmed that his father had made a gift of the Church of Wawne to the French abbey of St. Martin D’Auchy, Aumale in Normandy (Seine Maritime) and William for the first time, mentioned Wawne's dependent chapel of Sutton. However, in c. 1150 William also granted the church to the abbey at Meaux. The church was later in dispute and it was possibly because of these two conflicting grants. During the time of Thomas, Abbot of Meaux (1182–97), Aumale upheld its right to Wawne against Meaux's claim, and Meaux was obliged to offer the French abbey £6 13s. 4d. in order to enjoy the church and its chapel at Sutton; before eventually losing Wawne as the result of an exchange arranged by the Archbishop of York who reserved the church to his own use and annexed it to the chancellorship of York in 1230.

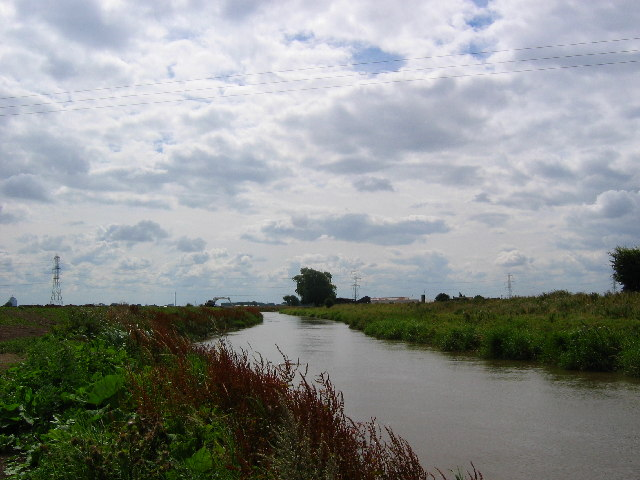
River Hull at Wawne

An alehouse at Wawne was first mentioned in the 1590s, and the Plough was named in 1666. Wawne and Meaux each had one or two licensed houses in the later 18th century, but only one was recorded from the 1820s, the Anchor, or Windham Arms, at the river crossing. The Windham Arms remained open until March 1967. It was later used as a farmhouse. The Waggoners Arms, on Sutton Road, was opened in the 1970s and is still trading today. For a time the "Waggoners" became a Chinese restaurant which was noted for its bright orange roof. This easily identifies the village when viewed from the air by aircraft passing overhead on their way to Humberside Airport.

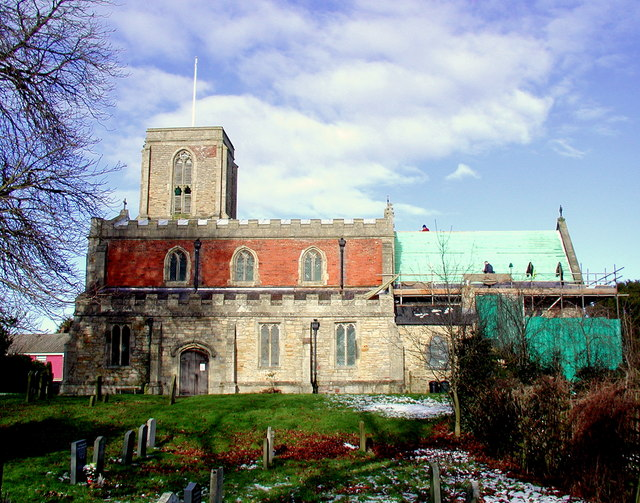
Parish Church of St Peter

The Manor House in Wawne, home of the Ashe Windham family, was replaced by housing for the guards and other employees of Hull Prison. The parish church of St Peter was designated a Grade I listed building in 1968 and is now recorded in the National Heritage List for England, maintained by Historic England. A small brick building was provided by the Windhams as a reading room in 1900, and evidently so used until 1926, when a First World War wooden hut was erected adjoining the room for a village institute. That hut was later replaced by another, and in the later 1980s a new brick-built village hall was put up on the site. The former reading room next door was used for church meetings. A library was run in Wawne Village Institute by the county council.

Before its 20th-century growth, the village had a cricket field on the south side of Main Street. That was replaced by another pitch, laid out on 1 1/2 acres on the north side of Ferry Road, bought in 1963; in 1971 the parish council enlarged the site by about 1/2 acres, and in turn made tennis courts and a children's play area there. A pavilion had been added by the 1980s. Land south-east of the church was bought in 1966 for a new vicarage but was later used instead for allotment gardens.

=== Ferry ===
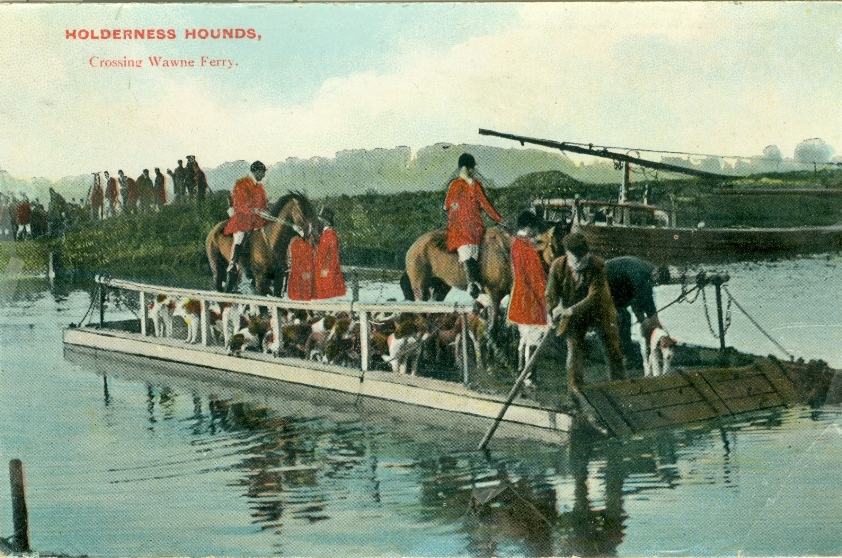
Holderness Hunt crossing the River Hull on the ferry in 1910

There was a ferry across the River Hull at least as early as the 12th century. In the 1820s the Windham Arms was kept by the ferryman. By the 1890s there was a punt for ferrying pedestrians and cyclists and a pontoon / chain ferry for farm machinery, for horse-drawn vehicles and farm animals. This was later used for cars, and drivers were charged sixpence or a shilling depending on the size of the vehicle. The opening of Sutton Road Bridge in Hull (1937) had a serious effect on Wawne Ferry because this was only three miles downstream. Drivers could use the new bridge for nothing but had to pay to use the ferry and were often delayed at the Thearne side of the river. The ferry continued in use during the Second World War but closed in August 1946 when the Windham Arms and the ferry rights were sold to Moors' and Robson's Brewery. They appointed Walter Twidale as their tenant and he reported that the ferry boat was no longer safe to use.

== Geography ==
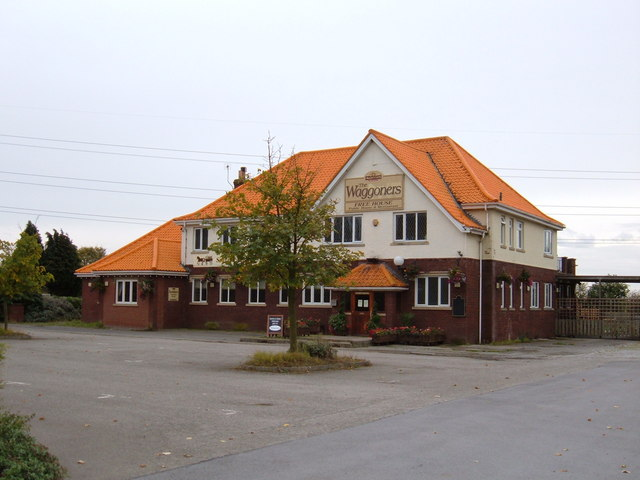
The Waggoners

Access to the village is provided via Meaux Road. Wawne itself was effectively a cul-de-sac, with no through roads. However, since 2002 development between the Public House and the village has taken the place of the old run down garage site.

The developments, St. Peters Walk and Church Lane have provided the village with new housing and made a more attractive approach to the main village. Local volunteers have also arranged flowerbeds and farming antiquities around the street signs, further enhancing the overall look of the village.

Both Ferry Road and Greens Lane terminate at the River Hull, where there is no crossing to the small village of Thearne on the opposite bank – Ferry Road is where the ferry was until 1946.

The Post Office is situated on Main Street. Wawne Primary School is located on Greens Lane.

== Flooding in 2007 ==
The village was hit during the floods in June 2007, mainly in Oak Square, where a blocked drain caused water levels to rise two feet and about five houses were flooded. The rest of the village was safe from the rising waters, except for Meaux Road corner.

== Connections to Sutton on Hull ==
Wawne has strong historic connections to the neighbouring village of Sutton on Hull, just 2 1/2 miles to the south east. In the early 12th century, villagers of the smaller hamlet of Sutton had to come to St Peter's Church in Wawne to attend mass and all feast days, this church then being ‘senior’ to the tiny chapel in Sutton. Thus baptisms, marriages and burials could only be carried out at St Peter's, until Sutton had its own newly built church of St James’ consecrated, in 1349, the year of the height of the Black Death.

Over the centuries, there has been a great deal of connection and inter-marriage between both villages, and the Sutton & Wawne Museum is a local folk museum housed within the Old School in Sutton, with collections of many artefacts, documents and photographs of common interest to both parishes, including all the historic farms and fields in the areas now called Bransholme, Kingswood and Sutton Park, as well as Stoneferry and Wilmington. At the museum, volunteers also research local family history for visitors and residents of both parishes.

== See also ==
- Listed buildings in Wawne
