= Hornsea Bridge railway station =

Disused railway station in Hornsea, East Riding of Yorkshire, England

Hornsea Bridge
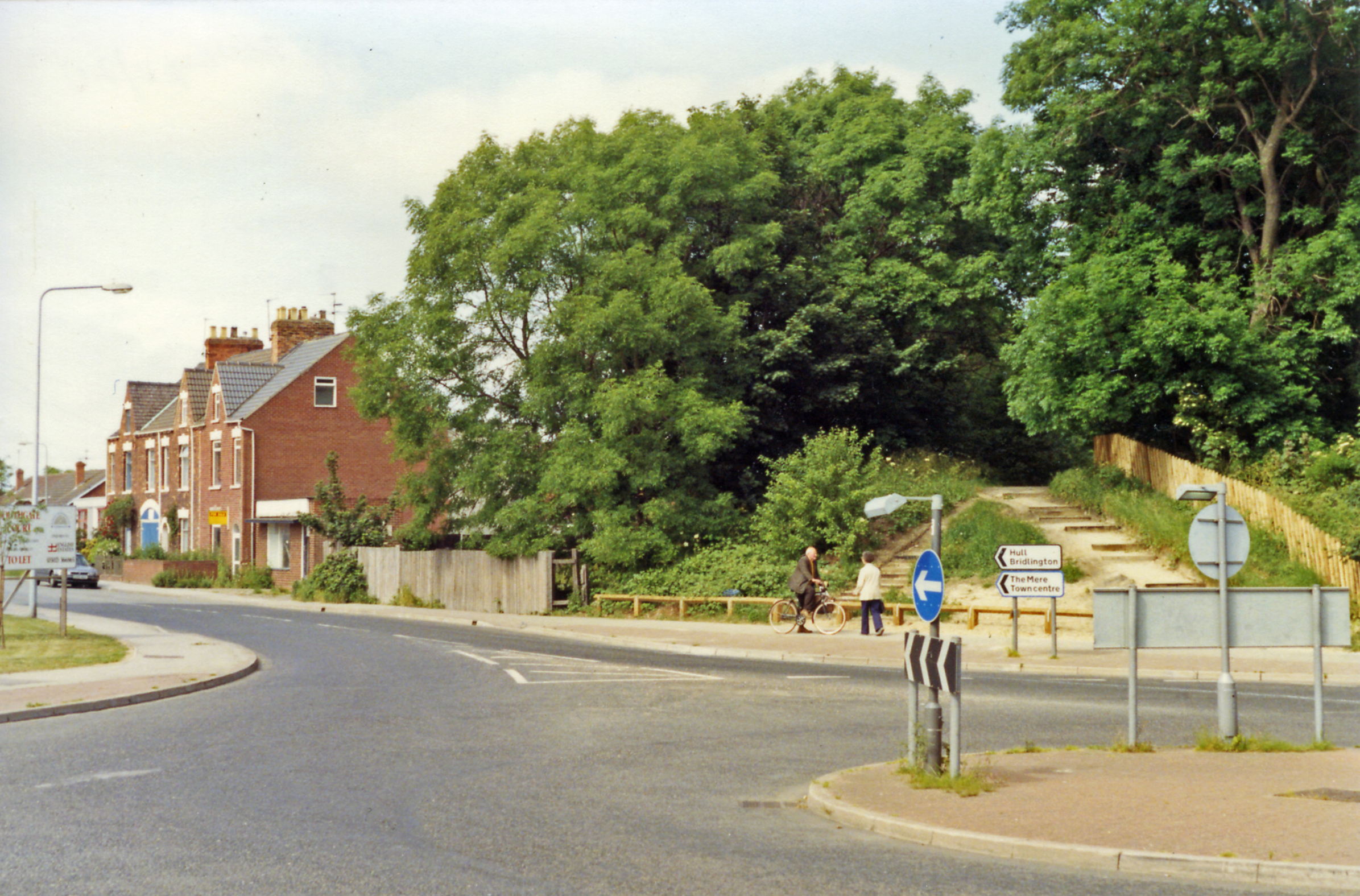
- Station location (1992)

General information
- Location: Hornsea, East Riding of Yorkshire; England
- Coordinates: 53.9041°N 0.1712°W
- Grid reference: TA202468
- Platforms: 2

Other information
- Status: Closed

History
- Original company: Hull and Hornsea Railway
- Pre-grouping: North Eastern Railway (UK)

Key dates
- 1864: opened
- 1964: closed
Location

Hornsea Bridge railway station was a railway station which served the town of Hornsea in the East Riding of Yorkshire, England. It was on the Hull and Hornsea Railway and the other station serving the town (the other being Hornsea Town). The station was 15 miles (24 km) north-east of Hull Paragon and just 0.5 miles (0.80 km) south-west of Hornsea Town railway station.

It opened to traffic on 28 March 1864 and closed to passengers, as recommended by the Beeching Report, on 19 October 1964. Closure to goods traffic came on 3 May 1965. As the goods yard for Hornsea was at Hornsea Bridge, the section of line northwards to Hornsea town closed completely in October 1964.

This station was originally to have been the terminus of the Hull and Hornsea railway, and was the goods station for Hornsea throughout its existence; the passenger platforms were on an embankment with the goods yard to the north at ground level. The station was on an embankment as it was built over the adjoining road on a bridge (which was always known locally as a viaduct) which had to be rebuilt before the railway could open as the soft ground underneath the bridge had not been considered in the original plans. In 1904, the goods yard was listed as having a crane capable of handling 2 tonnes (2.2 tons) and other sidings in the area catered for a brick works and a gas works.

The station was demolished quite soon after closure, the site is occupied by a new road layout with the large goods yard, which is now the site of an industrial estate. The embankment can be traced at the western end of the station site, the section at the eastern side of the road continues to Hornsea Town as a footpath. This break is the only major interruption in the old formation of the line.

Preceding station	Disused railways	Following station
Wassand	North Eastern Railway; Hull and Hornsea Railway	Hornsea Town
