= Meaux Abbey =

Former Cistercian abbey in the East Riding of Yorkshire, England

Coordinates: 53.83938°N 0.34193°W

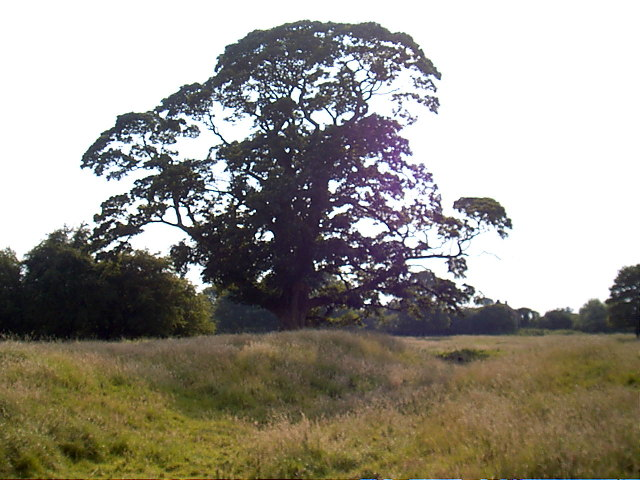
Site of Meaux Abbey, west of Meaux. Only earthworks are visible.

Meaux Abbey (archaic, also referred to as Melsa) was a Cistercian abbey founded in 1151 by William le Gros, 1st Earl of Albemarle (Count of Aumale), Earl of York and 4th Lord of Holderness, near Beverley in the East Riding of Yorkshire, England.

A chronicle of its history, Chronica Monasterii de Melsa, was written in about 1388 by Thomas Burton, the Bursar (later Abbot). The abbey owned the land of Wyke, which was purchased from it by King Edward I of England in 1293 to establish the town of Kingston upon Hull.

The abbey was closed in 1539 by King Henry VIII. It was demolished, and the stones were used to build defences for Kingston upon Hull.

The site of the abbey is a Scheduled Ancient Monument.
