= Swine, East Riding of Yorkshire =

Village and civil parish in the East Riding of Yorkshire, England

Coordinates: 53.806544°N 0.276251°W

Swine
- Location within the East Riding of Yorkshire
- Population: 139 (2011 census)
- OS grid reference: TA136358
- Civil parish: Swine
- Unitary authority: East Riding of Yorkshire
- Ceremonial county: East Riding of Yorkshire
- Region: Yorkshire and the Humber
- Country: England
- Sovereign state: United Kingdom
- Post town: HULL
- Postcode district: HU11
- Dialling code: 01964
- Police: Humberside
- Fire: Humberside
- Ambulance: Yorkshire
- UK Parliament: Beverley and Holderness

Swine is a village and civil parish in the East Riding of Yorkshire, England. It is situated approximately 5 miles (8 km) north-east of Hull city centre, and 2 miles (3.2 km) south of Skirlaugh to the west of the A165 road.

The place-name 'Swine' is first attested in the Domesday Book of 1086, where it appears as Swine. It appears as Suine in a charter of circa 1150. The name perhaps derives from the Old English swin meaning 'creek'.

In about 1625, Anne Gargill, an early Quaker writer was born here.

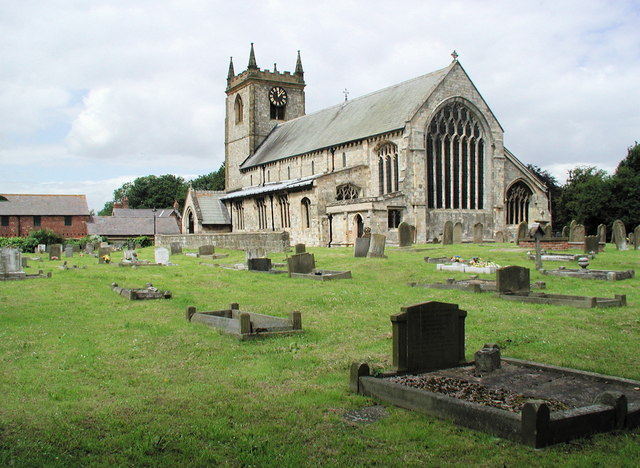
The Priory Church of St Mary the Virgin

The civil parish of Swine consists of the village of Swine and the hamlet of Benningholme. According to the 2011 UK census, Swine parish had a population of 139, a decrease on the 2001 UK census figure of 143.

The Priory Church of St Mary the Virgin was designated a Grade I listed building in 1966 and is now recorded in the National Heritage List for England, maintained by Historic England.

Swine was served from 1864 to 1964 by Swine railway station on the Hull and Hornsea Railway.

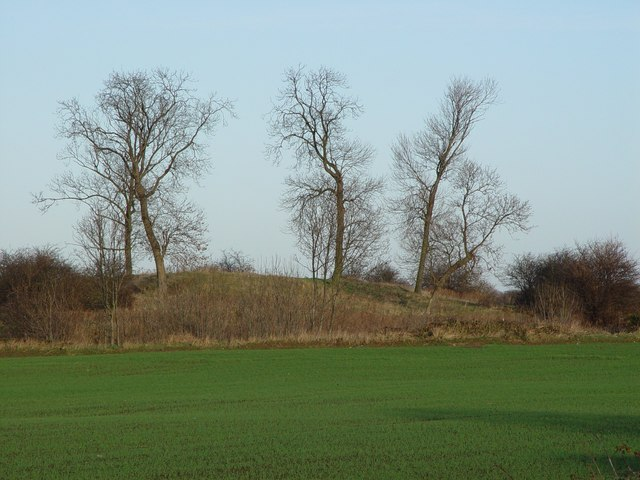
Swine Castle Hill

Two miles south-west of the village are the earthwork remains of the medieval Swine Castle (left), which is a scheduled monument.

== See also ==
- Listed buildings in Swine, East Riding of Yorkshire
