= Hornsea Town railway station =

Disused railway station in Hornsea, East Riding of Yorkshire, England

Hornsea Town
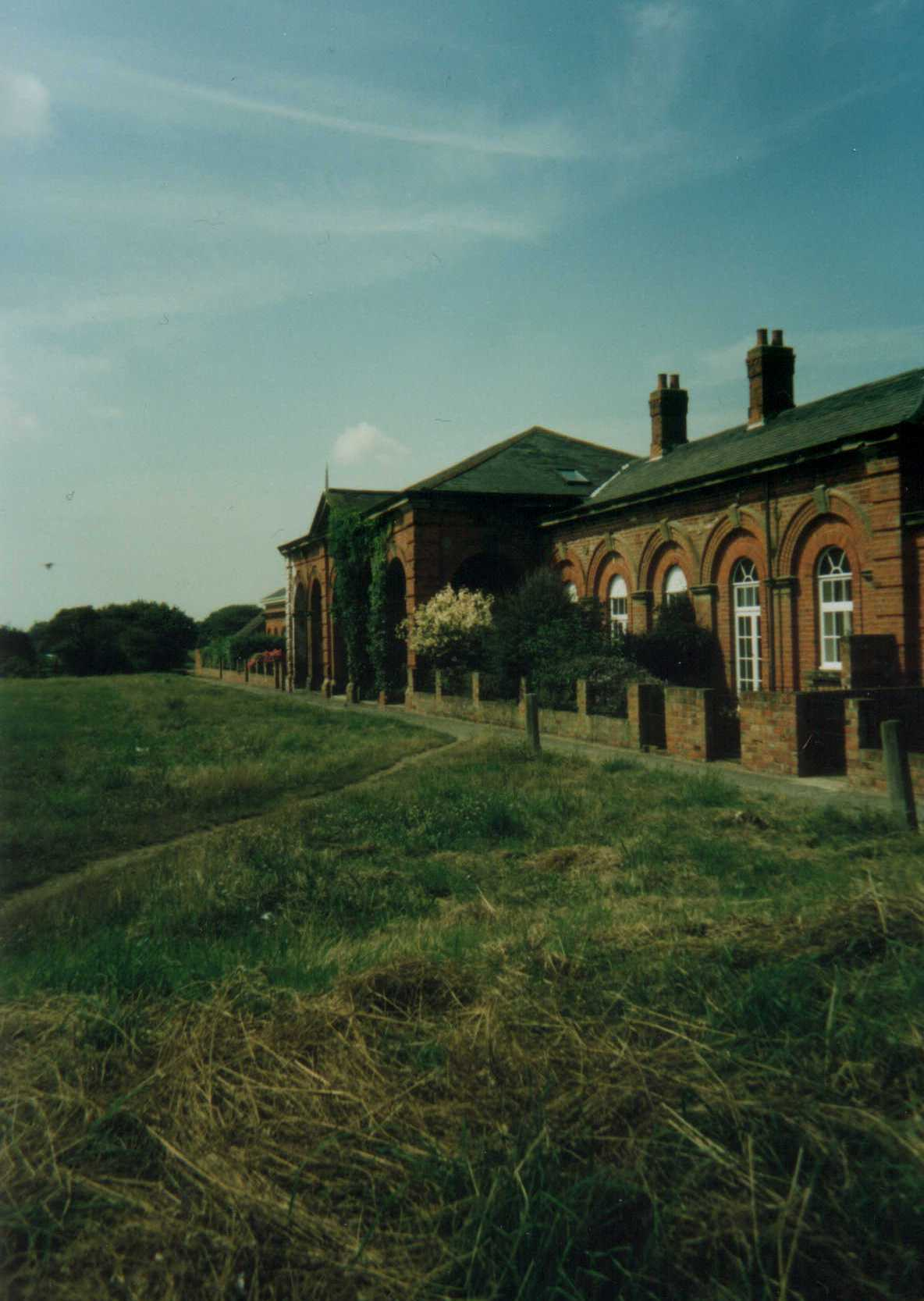

General information
- Location: Hornsea, East Riding of Yorkshire; England
- Coordinates: 53.9112°N 0.1633°W
- Grid reference: TA207476
- Platforms: 3

Other information
- Status: Disused

History
- Original company: Hull and Hornsea Railway
- Pre-grouping: North Eastern Railway (UK)

Key dates
- 28 March 1864: opened as Hornsea
- 25 September 1950: renamed as Hornsea Town
- 19 October 1964: closed

Listed Building – Grade II
- Feature: Railway station
- Designated: 19 December 1979 (amended 26 November 1985)
- Reference no.: 1249389
Location

Hornsea Town railway station was a railway station which served the town of Hornsea in the East Riding of Yorkshire, England. It was the terminus of the Hull and Hornsea Railway.

It opened with the rest of the line on 28 March 1864, it was originally named just "Hornsea".

The buildings were designed by Rawlins Gould. The station originally had one platform adjacent to the station building with a canopy over the platform. There was a turntable, a signal box and two goods sidings. By 1910 there was an additional double sided platform and long sidings.

The station was renamed – with the "Town" suffix – on 25 September 1950, and closed on 19 October 1964.

Two camping coaches were positioned here by the North Eastern Region from 1959 to 1964.

Hornsea Town railway station is now a Grade II listed building.

Preceding station	Disused railways	Following station
Hornsea Bridge	North Eastern Railway; Hull and Hornsea Railway	Terminus

== See also ==
- Listed buildings in Hornsea
