= Withernwick =

Village and civil parish in the East Riding of Yorkshire, England

Coordinates: 53.847169°N 0.184436°W

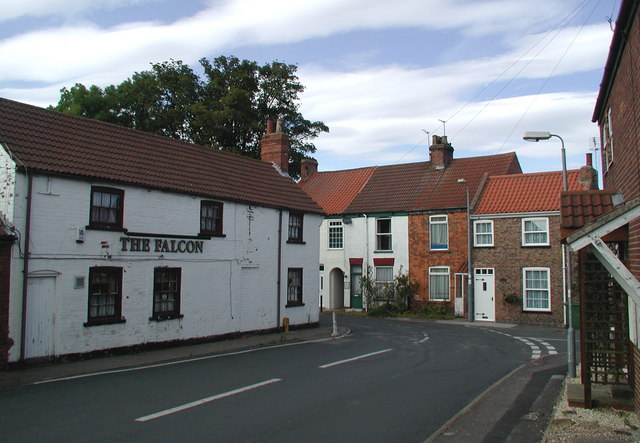
- Main Street, Withernwick

- Location within the East Riding of Yorkshire
- Population: 453 (2011 census)
- OS grid reference: TA195405
- Civil parish: Withernwick
- Unitary authority: East Riding of Yorkshire
- Ceremonial county: East Riding of Yorkshire
- Region: Yorkshire and the Humber
- Country: England
- Sovereign state: United Kingdom
- Post town: HULL
- Postcode district: HU11
- Dialling code: 01964
- Police: Humberside
- Fire: Humberside
- Ambulance: Yorkshire
- UK Parliament: Beverley and Holderness

Withernwick is a village and civil parish in the East Riding of Yorkshire, England. It is situated approximately 10 miles (16 km) north-east of Hull city centre and 5 miles (8 km) south of Hornsea.

According to the 2011 UK census, Withernwick parish had a population of 453, a reduction on the 2001 UK census figure of 474.

The name Withernwick derives from the Old English wiðþornwīc meaning 'trading settlement by the thorn tree'. Alternatively, the first element could possibly derive from the Old Norse personal name Vith-Forni.

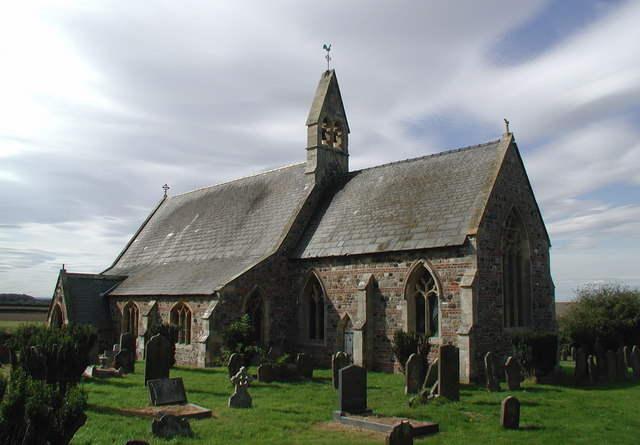
St Alban's Church

The parish church of St Alban is a Grade II listed building.

Over the past few years the village has been in decline, having lost its post office, school, Methodist chapel and village hall.

== See also ==
- Listed buildings in Withernwick
