= Skirlaugh =

Village and civil parish in the East Riding of Yorkshire, England

Coordinates: 53.840079°N 0.267274°W

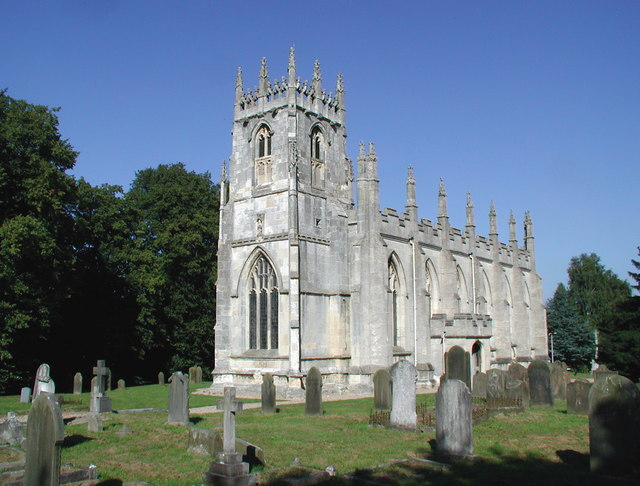
- St Augustine’s Church, Skirlaugh

- Location within the East Riding of Yorkshire
- Population: 1,473 (2011 census)
- OS grid reference: TA141395
- Civil parish: Skirlaugh
- Unitary authority: East Riding of Yorkshire
- Ceremonial county: East Riding of Yorkshire
- Region: Yorkshire and the Humber
- Country: England
- Sovereign state: United Kingdom
- Post town: HULL
- Postcode district: HU11
- Dialling code: 01964
- Police: Humberside
- Fire: Humberside
- Ambulance: Yorkshire
- UK Parliament: Beverley and Holderness

Skirlaugh is a village and civil parish in the East Riding of Yorkshire, England, in an area known as Holderness. It is situated approximately 7 miles (11 km) north-east of Hull city centre on the A165 road. Originally a farming community, it is now primarily a commuter village for Hull.

The name of the village is derived from Old English and originally meant shire clearing. The name is partly due to Old Norse influence, as the village lies in the former Danelaw; it is identical in meaning to Shirley.

According to the 2011 UK census, Skirlaugh parish had a population of 1,473, a decrease on the 2001 UK census figure of 1,543.

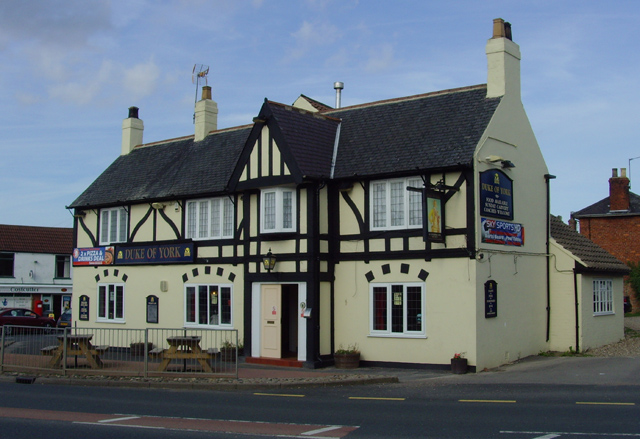
The Duke of York

The parish church, St Augustine's Church, was built by Walter de Skirlaw who later became the Bishop of Durham in the late 14th century. It is, according to Pevsner, a "gem of the early-perpendicular" style. This is because subsequent generations left the original structure largely intact. The stonework was re-pointed in the 1980s and 1990s by Edward Brown, a local volunteer. The church is a Local Ecumenical Partnership between the Church of England and the Methodist church. In 1966 the church was designated a Grade I listed building and is now recorded in the National Heritage List for England, maintained by Historic England.

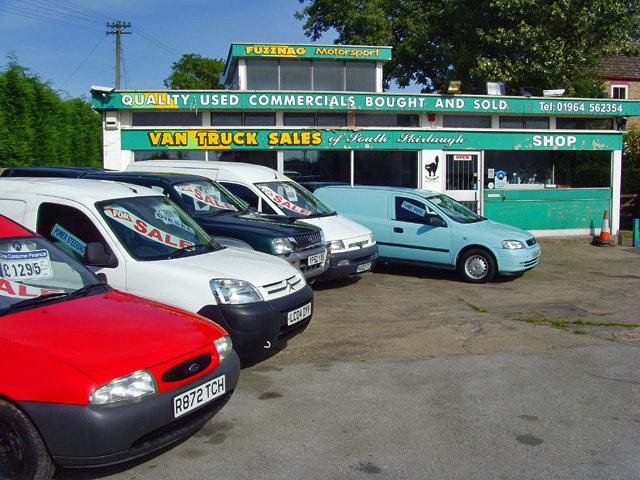
Fuzznag Motorsport dealership

Skirlaugh was served from 1864 to 1957 by Skirlaugh railway station on the Hull and Hornsea Railway even though the station was located 1.5 miles (2.4 km) south of the village.

Skirlaugh rugby league club, play in the Premier Division of the National Conference League.

== Notable people ==
- Walter de Skirlaw (?–1406), Bishop of Durham and adviser to King Richard II and Henry IV
- John Bigland (1750–1832), schoolmaster and historian

== See also ==
- Listed buildings in Skirlaugh
