= Hull and Hornsea Railway =

Disused railway in the East Riding of Yorkshire, England

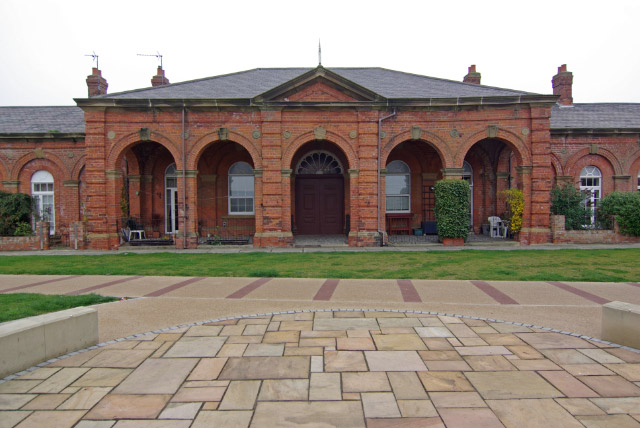
Hornsea Town railway station

The Hull and Hornsea Railway was a branch line which connected the city of Kingston upon Hull with the seaside town of Hornsea in the East Riding of Yorkshire, England.

== History ==
=== Early proposals and construction ===
A proposal for a railway line to Hornsea together with several other lines was part of the York, Hull and East and West Yorkshire Junction Railway (c. 1845), supported by the Manchester and Leeds Railway. As a consequence of this proposal entering into the 'territory' of the York and North Midland Railway (Y&NMR) alternative proposals were made by the Y&NMR, and put to Parliament at the same time – both proposals included lines from near Beverley to Hornsea amongst their proposed routes. The Y&NMR's line was of 10.5 miles (16.9 km) and would link Beverley (on the Hull to Bridlington Line) to Hornsea via a junction near Arram railway station north of Beverley. This line was to terminate at a site near Hornsea Mere. Construction of the line was authorised as part of the York and North Midland Railway (East Riding Branches) (No. 2) Act 1846 (9 & 10 Vict. c. lxvi), and included a branch from Selby to Market Weighton as well as the Hornsea branch. As a result of the poor financial position the Y&NMR was placed in following the downfall of George Hudson the line and several others was postponed and not constructed.

Hull and Hornsea Railway Act 1862
- Act of Parliament
- Parliament of the United Kingdom
- Long title: An Act for making a Railway from Kingston-upon-Hull to Hornsea.
- Citation: 25 & 26 Vict. c. c

Dates
- Royal assent: 30 June 1862

Text of statute as originally enacted

Bills were submitted in 1856 and 1861 for approval by Parliament of a line from a junction on the Victoria Dock Branch Line in Hull to Hornsea. The 1861 proposal was successful, and the Hull and Hornsea Railway Act 1862 (25 & 26 Vict. c. c) was passed authorising its construction. Promoted by Hornsea resident and Hull timber merchant, Joseph Armytage Wade the line was to both provide transportation to and from the agricultural region of Holderness, and to promote Hornsea as a seaside resort. The line was to be 13 miles (21 km) in length for which the act allowed the raising of £70,000 in shares and £23,000 in loans.

- No. 1. A Railway commencing by a Junction with the Victoria Dock Branch of the North-eastern Railway in that Part of the Parish of Sutton which is within the Town or Borough of Kingston-upon-Hull and County of the same Town or Borough at or near the Point where such Branch Railway crosses the Stoneferry Road, and on the East Side of such Road, and terminating in the Parish of Hornsea in the East Riding of the County of York;
- No. 2. A Branch Railway commencing by a Junction with Railway No. 1 in the Parish of Hornsea about Three hundred and fifty Yards from where the Railway No. 1 terminates in the Parish of Hornsea, and terminating in the said Parish of Hornsea;
- No. 3. A Branch Railway commencing by a Junction with the said intended Railway No. 1 in that Part of the Parish of Sutton which is within the Town or Borough of Kingston-upon-Hull and County of the same Town or Borough, and terminating in the Parish of Drypool within the said Town or Borough of Kingston-upon-Hull at or near the North Side of the Holderness Road where such Road is crossed by the said Victoria Dock Branch of the Northeastern Railway;
— Section 18, Hull and Hornsea Railway Act 1862 (25 & 26 Vict. c. c)

The first sod was ceremonially cut, by Mr Wade using a silver spade and ornate wheelbarrow, on 8 October 1862.

The terminus was originally to be at Hornsea Bridge, but the plans were changed and a decision was made to extend right to the seafront — the extension required a costly viaduct over the low ground at Stream Dike. The viaduct was later replaced by an embankment. The land on which the extension ran was boggy, requiring extensive piles to support the line. Consequently, the cost of construction increased from £68,000 to £122,000.

=== Route and operation ===
The line began in Hull at Wilmington railway station east of Cleveland Street (now Stoneferry Road) just to the east of the Victoria Dock Branch Line. The line then ran generally east and north towards Hornsea.

The line was officially opened on 28 March 1864, with the first train departing Wilmington railway station at 12:00 noon. From 1 June 1864 traffic travelled along the newly doubled Victoria Dock Branch Line (together with trains from the Hull and Holderness Railway) into Paragon station.

North-eastern, Hull, and Hornsea Railway Amalgamation Act 1866
- Act of Parliament
- Parliament of the United Kingdom
- Long title: An Act for amalgamating the Undertaking of the Hull and Hornsea Railway Company with that of the North-eastern Railway Company; and for other Purposes.
- Citation: 29 & 30 Vict. c. clxxxvii

Dates
- Royal assent: 16 July 1866

Text of statute as originally enacted

Although the expected traffic materialised the cost overruns of the construction left the company in debt, attempts to raise further funds by share issue had failed; the line merged with the North Eastern Railway on 16 July 1866, sanctioned by the North-eastern, Hull, and Hornsea Railway Amalgamation Act 1866 (29 & 30 Vict. c. clxxxvii).

In 1914 there were 14 trains a day between Hull and Hornsea, including a non-stop 'express' for business commuters at 8.50 am (to Hull) and 5.18 pm (to Hornsea). Two trains ran on Sundays. At this time a typical goods locomotive on the line was the Class J type 0-6-0, passenger trains were also worked by 0-6-0 tender locomotives as well as ex-GCR Class 9Ns and ex-Great Northern Railway 4-4-2 locomotives during the LNER period.

The service remained at a similar level of intensity until the 1950s, excluding reductions in frequency during the First and Second World Wars. In January 1957 Diesel multiple units had been introduced on the line.

Closure of the line came as a direct result of the Beeching Report. The last passenger train ran on 19 October 1964. Goods traffic continued to use the line as far as Hornsea Bridge until 3 May 1965.

One short section was retained in north-east Hull, part of the line east of Wilmington station as far as the level crossing at Chamberlain Road provided a head shunt for trains to Wilmington cement works (see Wilmington, Kingston upon Hull), accessed via a new chord from the former Hull and Barnsley Line. The section became operational in 1968. The cement works closed 1969, and by the 1980s the section had been removed.

=== Stations ===
Stations on the line from Hull to Hornsea
Station	Opened	Closed	Notes / Map reference	Current status
Wilmington	1864	1964	Replaced by new station in 1912 on the Victoria Dock Branch Line west of the original. 53.7596°N 0.3300°W	Demolished. The booking office remains as a cafe.
Sutton	1864	1964	Renamed Sutton-on-Hull in 1874. 53.781900°N 0.307200°W	Demolished. Station master's house is a private residence
Swine	1864	1964	Staggered platforms either side of a level crossing. 53.804200°N 0.265100°W	Station building is a private residence
Skirlaugh	1864	1957	53.820900°N 0.249500°W	Demolished, platforms remain
Ellerby	1864	1902; 1959	The station was a 'market station' opening only on Tuesdays. After closing to passengers in 1902 it was referred to as Ellerby siding. Renamed again to Weelerby West Siding* in 1923. 53.829000°N 0.236300°W	The station is a private residence. Platforms remain.
Marton / Burton Constable / Ellerby	1864	1964	Renamed to Burton Constable on 1 August 1864, then to Ellerby* in 1922. 53.838000°N 0.226100°W	Station building still extant.
Whitedale	1864	1964	53.851500°N 0.218800°W	Station, platforms and goods yard still extant.
Hatfield / Sigglesthorne	1864	1964	Staggered platforms on either side of a road crossing. Renamed Sigglesthorne* in 1874. 53.870200°N 0.206800°W	Station house is a private residence.
Goxhill / Wassand	1864	1953 / 1960	A 'market day' station; services only 1 day per week. Renamed Wassand* in 1904. Closed to passengers in 1953, completely in 1960. 53.883000°N 0.193800°W	Station building is a private residence
Hornsea Bridge	1864	1964	Also contained the goods facilities for the town, north of the station. 53.904090°N 0.171200°W	Demolished
Hornsea / Hornsea Town	1864	1964	The terminus of the Hull and Hornsea Railway, the building had a station canopy on cast iron columns. Renamed Hornsea Town in 1950. 53.911200°N 0.163300°W	Restored and converted to housing in 1987 after dereliction. Grade II listed building.
* Stations were renamed to avoid confusion with similarly named stations on the same railway company's network – typically this occurred on expansion and on mergers

== After closure ==
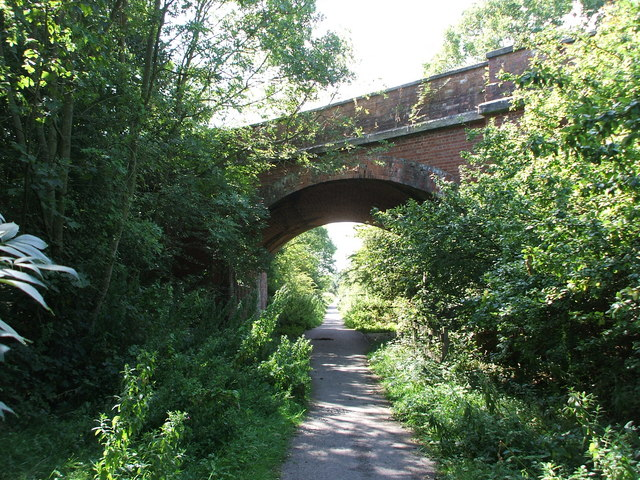
Road bridge over the trackbed, near Hornsea

Almost the entire route today can be followed as a public footpath known as the Hornsea Rail Trail (part of the Trans Pennine Trail); many of the station buildings remain in the rural areas outside Hull. The line can also still be seen on preserved tile maps on LNER stations such as on the North Yorkshire Moors Railway.

== See also ==
- Hull and Holderness Railway
