= Church of All Saints, Skipsea =

Anglican church in the East Riding of Yorkshire, England

- All Saints Church
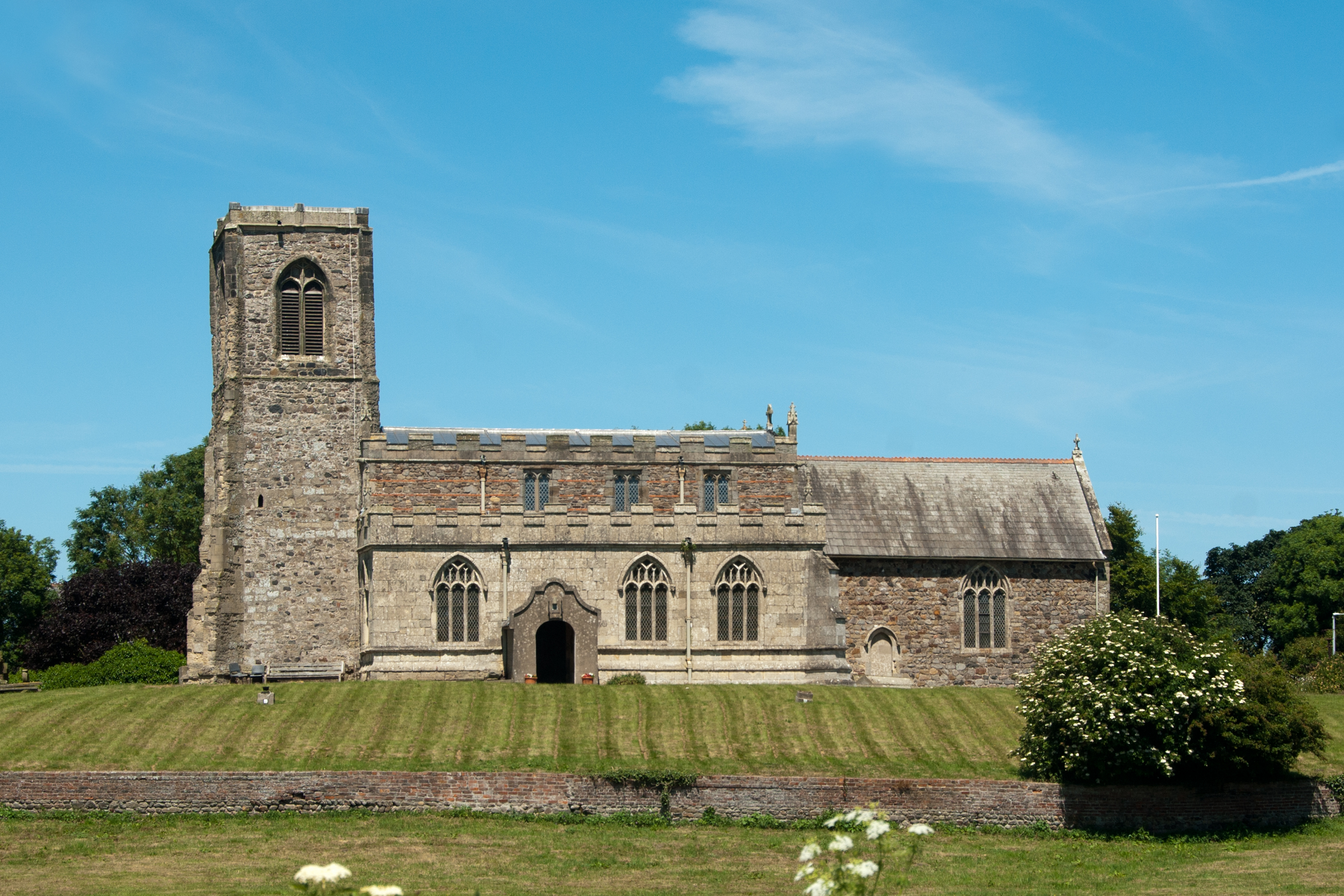
- All Saints, Skipsea
- Church of All Saints, Skipsea
- 53.977°N 0.224°W
- OS grid reference: TA 165 549
- Location: Skipsea, East Riding of Yorkshire
- Country: England
- Denomination: Church of England
- Website: Official webpage

History
- Status: Parish church

Architecture
- Functional status: Active

Administration
- Diocese: York
- Archdeaconry: East Riding
- Deanery: Holderness North
- Benefice: Hornsea, Atwick and Skipsea
- Parish: Skipsea

Listed Building – Grade I
- Designated: 30 June 1966
- Reference no.: 1083824

The Church of All Saints, is the church for the village and parish of Skipsea, in the East Riding of Yorkshire, England. The church dates back to the late 11th/early 12th century and was the religious house tied to Skipsea Castle, which lay just to the west in Skipsea Brough. A causeway, to the north of the church, used to link it with the castle motte across what was Skipsea Bail Mere. The village continued developing long after the castle had been demolished c. 1221, and the church became the house of worship for Skipsea.

The church is partly Norman, but mostly Perpendicular in its architectural style, and the tower still shows evidence of being constructed from cobbles, stones which were quarried from the beaches in Holderness. The church is now a grade I listed structure and underwent several renovations in the 19th century. All Saints is at the west end of Skipsea, on the road which connects the village with Beeford.

== History ==
The church was built in the late 11th century for the inhabitants of the castle and the supporting village that grew up around the castle. The original church, which was believed to have been mostly constructed from cobbles, was built by Odo, the Duke of Albemarle c. 1090, and the entire church was rebuilt in the 14th century. Cobbles were rounded stones found on beaches in the Holderness region, which were used to build many structures, particularly churches, in the Middle Ages. In 1115, the "church of the castle at Skipsea" was granted by Earl Stephen to the monastery of Aumale, along with other churches in Mappleton, Easington, Kilnsea and Tunstall. In the early part of the 13th century, the castle was ordered to be destroyed, but the church survived.

When the Albemarle family line died out, their estate and the advowson for the church reverted to the crown c. 1294, with Edward I granting the church to Meaux Abbey in 1305. When built, the church was on a mound in-between the castle and the developing village, on what is now the B1249 road between Skipsea and Beeford. At that point, the church was over an hour's walk to the sea eastwards, but the erosion of the coast has left the village and church very close to the coastline.

Whilst under the tenure of Meaux Abbey, the roof was repaired twice in the 14th century, and stained glass windows were installed around the same time. In the 15th century, the clerestory was added and the whole of the church had new glass added. The dedication of the church was first recorded in the year 1500, but it was listed as being either All Saints or All Hallows. The church has a west tower, a chancel, nave and two aisles (north and south) both of which have clerestories. Traces of the original Norman architecture remain in the church, however the oldest substantial remains are the east window and the naves which can be dated back into the 14th century. The majority of the church has been described as being Perpendicular in its architectural style, aside from some isolated sections of Norman and Decorated architecture. The roof of the nave and the clerestory are "embattled", and the tower retains much of its original style.

The chancel was rebuilt in 1824, and three years later, the roof of the nave was renovated. The cost of the renovations was largely borne by the Reverend J Gilby, who was the incumbent at the time. He has been credited with repairing the inner walls, whilst leaving the external walls in the style in which they were designed. Further renovations costing £1,400 were completed in July 1866. During these renovations, the rood-screen was cut down on the order of the archdeacon, and a font and desk were installed, the latter being a donation of the renovating architect, James Fowler. The 1866 renovation also saw the addition of a south facing porch, which Glynne describes as being "bad [and made of] brick". After this, the vestry was added (1874) and the tower was restored in 1893 and again in 1932, having not been part of the renovations of 1866. The tower, though nominally square in design, is actually wider from north to south, than it is east to west and displays signs of its Perpendicular character. It is unsure exactly when the tower lost its embattlements, as these were not recorded in the 19th century renovations, however, by the latter end of the 19th century, they were recorded as having been removed.

In 1835, the church was recorded as being dedicated to All Saints, serving a population of 726 and worth £96, with the Archbishop of York having the rights of advowson. The population of the village of Skipsea at the time was just over 300, so the numbers allocated were from across the whole parish. Although for a time it was a separate parish, the inhabitants of Ulrome had no burial rights at their church, and so they were required to maintain payments to Skipsea to retain burial rights there. Before the 18th century, the township of Ulrome was divided into the parishes of Barmston and Skipsea.

The church has numerous stained glass windows, with a cluster of three windows in the west end and in the nave, whilst the east end had a 4-light window, which was endowed in the church during one of the restorations in the 19th century. This 4-light window now hosts a memorial to those from the parish who died in the First World War and includes St George, a dragon and angels holding up a scroll with the names of the dead.

The church sits on a low mound, about 26 feet (8 m) above sea level, overlooking what would have been Skipsea Bail Mere, a body of water which protected the castle and which was eventually drained to enable the land to be used in agriculture. A causeway to the north across Skipsea Bail Mere, linked the church (and later the vicarage) with what was the castle area. Though this has largely disappeared in the modern era, mapping from the early 20th century still shows the location of the causeway. The church was grade I listed in 1966.

== Benefice and parish ==
All Saints is the parish church for the ecclesiastical parish of Skipsea, and the church is in the Benefice of Hornsea, Atwick and Skipsea.

== See also ==
- Grade I listed churches in the East Riding of Yorkshire
- Listed buildings in Skipsea
