= St Edmund's Church, Fraisthorpe =

Church in the East Riding of Yorkshire, England

Coordinates: 54°02′18″N 0°14′21″W

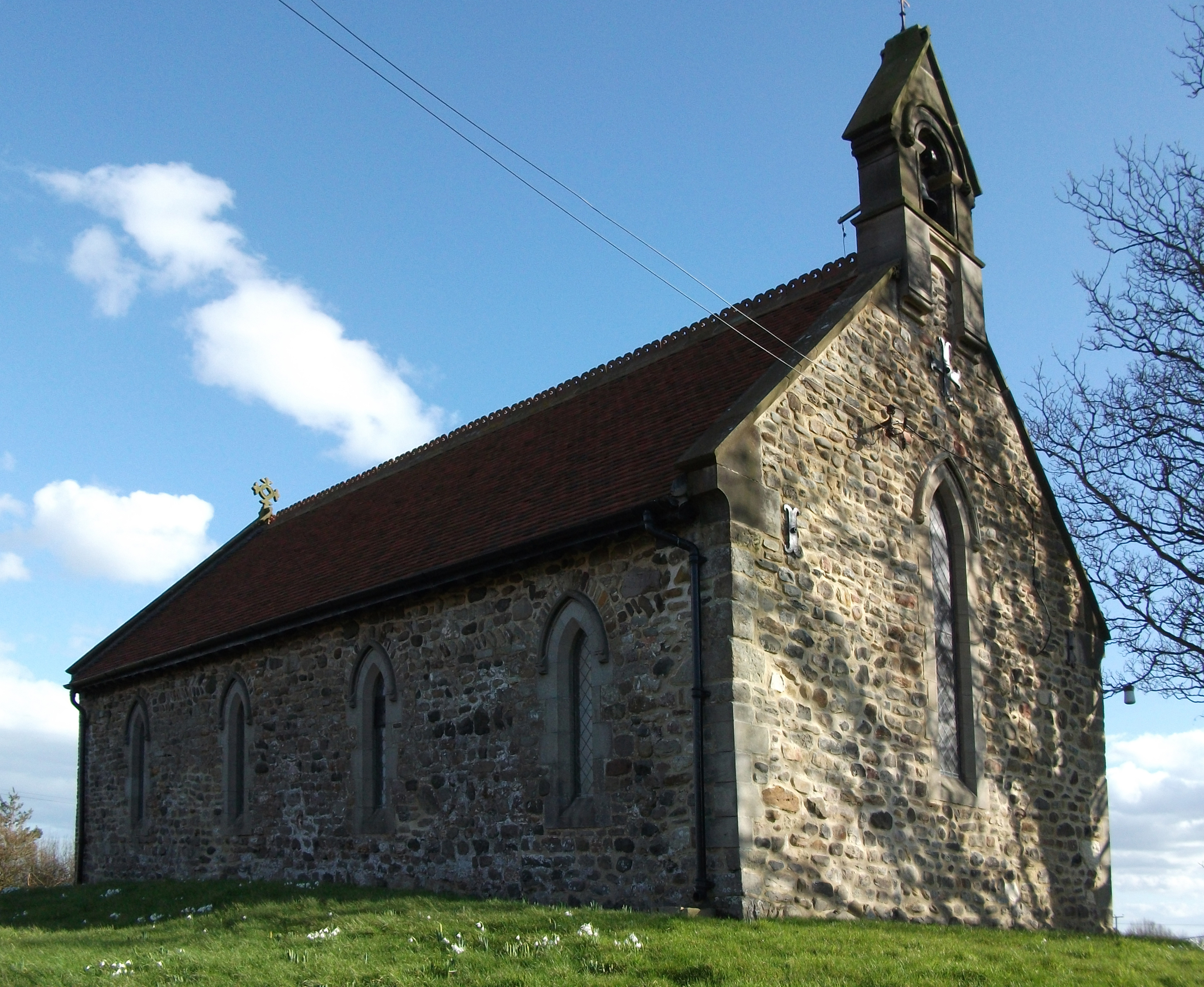
The church, in 2010

St Edmund's Church is a disused Anglican church in Fraisthorpe, a village in the East Riding of Yorkshire, in England.

A church was built in Fraisthorpe in the 12th or 13th century. From this period, one pier and capital survive, along with a font and perhaps a blocked doorway. The church was almost entirely rebuilt in 1893 by Richard George Smith and Frederick Stead Brodrick. The building was grade II listed in 1987. It closed in the 2010s, and was converted into a private house in 2021.

It is built in cobble and stone, with quoins, sprocketed eaves, and a tile roof with stone coped gables and crested ridged tiles. It consists of a four-bay nave and chancel in one. On the west gable is a bracketed bellcote with a moulded semicircular opening and a gabled top. On the south front is a pointed doorway with moulded imposts, and the windows are chamfered lancets. All the openings have hood moulds and relieving arches.

== See also ==
- Listed buildings in Barmston, East Riding of Yorkshire
