= Drogo de la Beuvrière =

Flemish associate of William the Conqueror

- Disappeared: c.1087
- Notable work: Skipsea Castle

Drogo de la Bouerer (also recorded as Drogo of la Beuvrière, Drogo de la Bouerer. (Note: Written as wide variety of variants, including 'Drogo de la Beuvrière' in the Fountains Abbey record; 'Drogo de la Bouerer' in the Meaux chronicle; 'Drogo de Bevrere', '.. Bevaria', '.. Bevriere', or 'Drogo de Heldrenesse' in the Domesday book;, in Camden 'Drugoni de Buerer', elsewhere written 'Drue Debeverer', or 'Drago de Holderness'.)) was a Flemish associate of William the Conqueror, who was rewarded after the conquest with a large grant of land in northern and eastern England, primarily in Holderness, where he built Skipsea Castle.

After the unexplained death of his wife, Drogo fled England, supposedly for Flanders, and disappears from history. His land in England subsequently became the property of Odo, Count of Champagne.

== Biography ==
Much of what is known about Drogo de la Bouerer is known from the Domesday Book of 1086, and the chronicles of Fountains Abbey in North Yorkshire and of Meaux Abbey in East Yorkshire.

According to the Domesday record, after the Norman Conquest Drogo held lands in and was lord of all of Holderness, holding dozens of manors there; (Note: Drogo held all the lands in Holderness, excluding those owned by the church - he claimed the lands of William Malet who had been captured by Danes in 1069.) he also held land in Lincolnshire and was lord of Castle Bytham, Little Bytham, Anwick, Ruskington, Carlton-le-Moorland, Barrow-upon-Humber, Goxhill, and Great Limber; in Norfolk he was lord of Saxlingham, Bessingham, North Barningham, Hindringham, Burgh-next-Aylsham, Erpingham, and Gissing as well having other possessions there; he was lord of Chadstone, Northamptonshire; and lord of Oakley, Suffolk, and also had land in Sotherton, Suffolk; and in Cold Overton, and Hoby, Leicestershire. Drogo acquired his lands primarily from the holdings of Morcar of Northumbria, also from Ulf son of Tope.

The Cistercian writers give very similar accounts. In the Chronica Monasterii de Melsa (Chronicles of Meaux Abbey), Drogo is said to have been from Flanders. (Note: It is thought that Drogo would have been from either La Beuvrière, or possibly Beuvry, both near Béthune.) - he was rewarded by William of Normandy after the conquest with the Isle of Holderness, and was the builder of Skipsea Castle.

Drogo poisoned his own wife, possibly by accident, after which he visited the King asking permission to return to Flanders, and borrowed money from him, and then left the country by sea. According to William Camden his wife was the King's niece, and he killed her by poisoning.

On discovering the lie King William sent for Drogo to be arrested, but he was never caught, and subsequently Drogo's possessions in Holderness were passed to Odo, Count of Champagne. Odo became Lord of Holderness sometime before September 1087.
