= St Andrew's Church, Ulrome =

Church in Ulrome, East Riding of Yorkshire, England

Coordinates: 53°59′38″N 0°13′47″W

The church, in 2017

St Andrew's Church is the parish church of Ulrome, a village in the East Riding of Yorkshire, in England.

A chapel was built in Ulrome by 1226, serving areas in the parishes of All Saints' Church, Barmston and All Saints' Church, Skipsea. Although it was dissolved under the 1547 Chantries Act, the building survived as a place of worship. It was damaged in a storm in 1778 but soon rebuilt. By the early 19th century, it was largely built of boulders and consisted of a nave, chancel, south porch, and west tower. In 1876, the nave and chancel were rebuilt to a 13th-century Gothic design by Armfield & Bottomley. They used mostly old materials, and retained two 13th-century doors and a 15th-century window. In 1904, the tower was heightened, to designs by Brodrick, Lowther & Walker, and in 1914 a clock was installed. The church was grade II listed in 1966.

The church is built of stone, with dressings in brick and stone, and has a Welsh slate roof. The church consists of a nave with a south porch, a chancel with a north vestry, and a west tower. The tower has two stages, round-arched openings in the lower stage, a band, a south clock face, two-light bell openings in round arches, a string course, a low parapet and a pyramidal roof. Most of the windows on the body of the church are lancets. Inside, there is a 12th-century tub font, probably moved from elsewhere.

== See also ==
- Listed buildings in Ulrome
