= Lissett =

Village in the East Riding of Yorkshire, England

Coordinates: 54.006341°N 0.255491°W

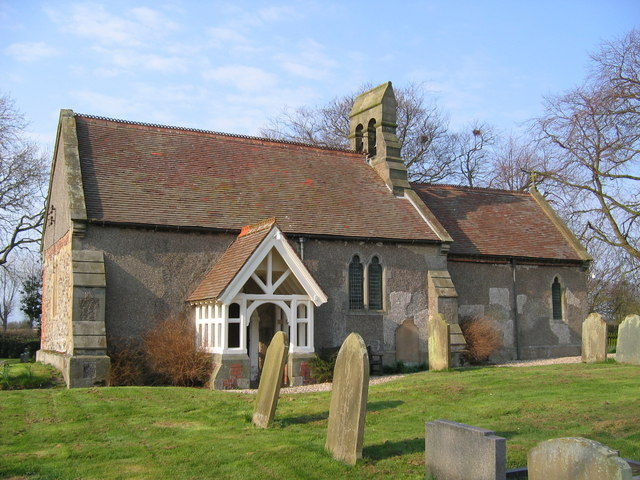
- St James Church, Lissett

- Location within the East Riding of Yorkshire
- OS grid reference: TA144581
  - London: 170 mi (270 km) S
- Civil parish: Ulrome
- Unitary authority: East Riding of Yorkshire
- Ceremonial county: East Riding of Yorkshire
- Region: Yorkshire and the Humber
- Country: England
- Sovereign state: United Kingdom
- Post town: DRIFFIELD
- Postcode district: YO25
- Dialling code: 01262
- Police: Humberside
- Fire: Humberside
- Ambulance: Yorkshire
- UK Parliament: Bridlington and The Wolds

Lissett is a village and former civil parish, now in the parish of Ulrome, in the Holderness area of the East Riding of Yorkshire, England. It is situated 6 miles (10 km) south of Bridlington town centre and 13 miles (21 km) north-east of Beverley town centre on the A165 road that connects the two towns. In 1931, the parish had a population of 95.

In 1823, Lissett, with a population of 95, was in the parish of Beeford, and the Wapentake and Liberty of Holderness. A chapel of ease existed in the village. Lissett was once a township and chapelry in the parish of Beeford. In 1866, Lissett became a civil parish in its own right. On 1 April 1935, the parish was abolished and merged with Ulrome.

The name Lissett derives from the Old English lǣsset meaning 'pasture dwelling'.

In 1942, an RAF station, RAF Lissett, was built there. Its main role was to serve as a bomber airfield for the Halifax Bomber 158 Squadron. It had a short life – the final mission left the airbase on 25 April 1945. The airfield is now part of a small industrial estate in the village. In December 2008, a 30 MW wind farm housing twelve turbines each 125 metres (410 ft) high was constructed across the western end of the airfield.

The village church, St James, is a Grade II listed building and houses the oldest dated bell in England, dated 1254. Perhaps of 14th-century origin, it was rebuilt by Hugh Roumieu Gough in 1876. Remaining from the previous church are fragments of a Norman capital in the east wall. The east stained glass window is by Charles Eamer Kempe, with Morris-style diamond-shaped flower details and lettering.

== See also ==
- Listed buildings in Ulrome
