= Barmston =

Barmston may refer to:

- Barmston, East Riding of Yorkshire, England
- Barmston, Tyne and Wear, an area of Washington, Tyne and Wear, England
