= Charles Whiting (disambiguation) =

Charles Whiting (1926–2007) was a British writer and military historian.

Charles Whiting may also refer to:

- Charles Whiting (cricketer) (1888–1959), English cricketer
- Charles S. Whiting (1863–1922), Associate Justice of the South Dakota Supreme Court
- Charles J. Whiting, American cavalry major
- Charlie Whiting (1952–2019), FIA Formula One race director
