= Charles Whiting (cricketer) =

English cricketer

Charles Percival Whiting (18 April 1888 – 14 January 1959) was an English first-class cricketer.

Born in Dringhoe, Skipsea, Yorkshire, England, Whiting was a right arm fast bowler and right-handed tail order batsman. He played in four matches for Yorkshire County Cricket Club in 1914, before reappearing after World War I for two more games in 1920. He took 5 for 46 against Essex, his only five wicket haul, and fifteen wickets altogether at an average of 27.73. His highest first-class innings was 26 against Kent. He also appeared for the Yorkshire Second XI between 1911 and 1923, and represented the East Riding in 1919.

Whiting's business as a corn and seed merchant, precluded him from an offered engagement by Yorkshire. He did have a couple of seasons with Leeds C.C. as a semi-professional, otherwise all his cricket was with Driffield C.C. He became managing director of James Mortimer Ltd., of Driffield, having begun working for them as a boy.

Whiting died in January 1959, in Driffield, Yorkshire.
