= Skipsea meres =

Former freshwater lakes in the East Riding of Yorkshire, England

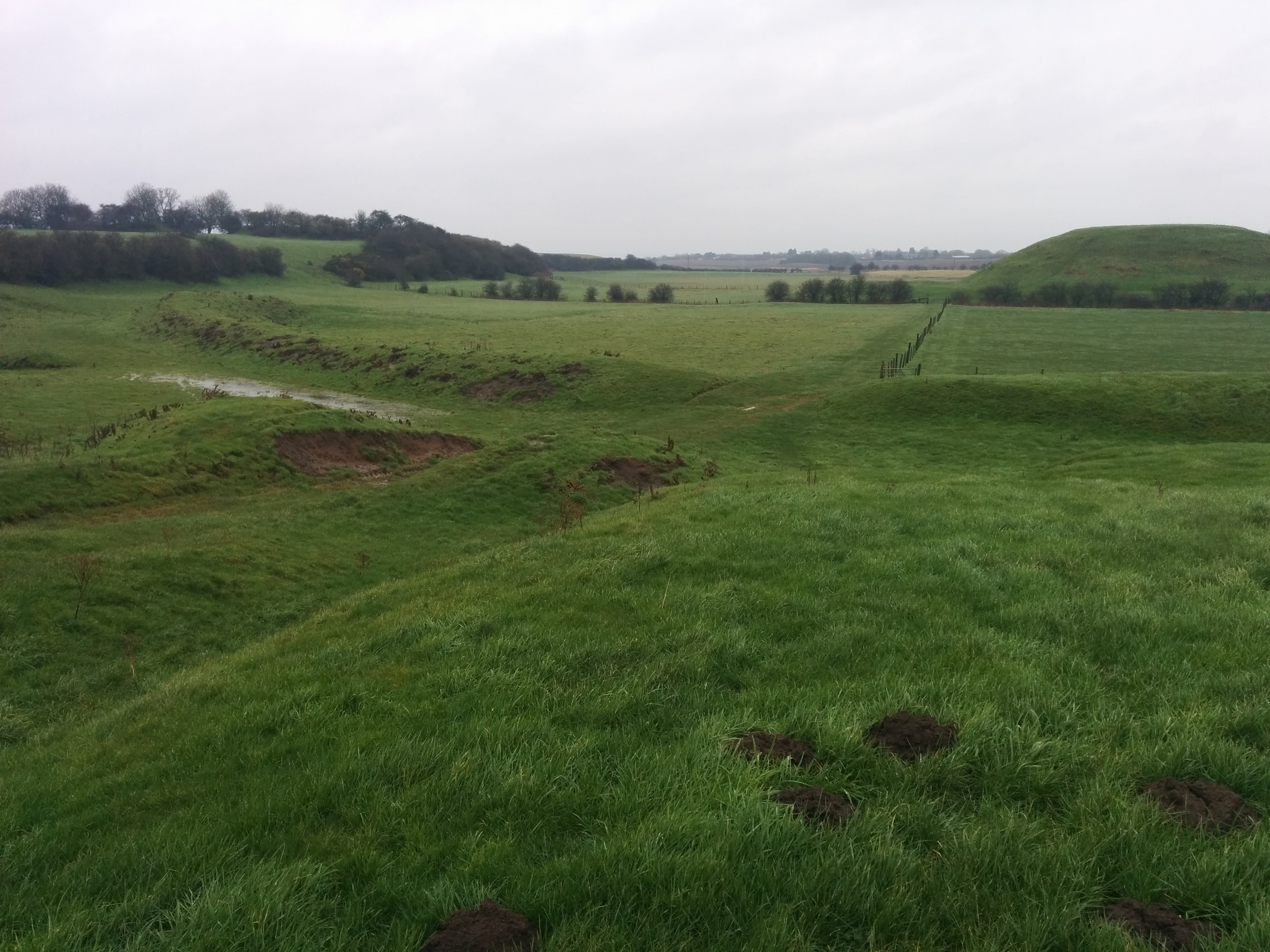
Skipsea Castle outside earth works. The castle was on the raised mound on the right; water would have submerged the low land in the foreground

The Skipsea meres were three lakes in and around the village of Skipsea in the East Riding of Yorkshire, England. The meres that are known to have existed were Skipsea Bail Mere, Skipsea Low Mere and Skipsea Withow Mere. The name of the village, Skipsea, means lake, or harbour for ships.

At least two of the meres were natural, filling with water in a post-glacial landscape, whilst the third, Skipsea Mere, was possibly created as part of the defences for the castle. All the water from the meres has either drained away naturally, or been removed by human intervention, most notably for agricultural purposes.

== History ==
The three meres at Skipsea have existed since the Holocene period, when the glacial activity created the meres, sometimes in the form of kettle holes. Dried out post-glacial meres are common in Holderness, with the low-lying land not able to adequately drain the water away, though most of the water did eventually flow through the Hull Valley and into the Humber. In the post-glacial period, Holderness would have resembled the Norfolk Broads, with many areas having standing water. This is reflected in some of the place names: Marfleet, Marton, Redmere and Rowmere. (Note: Marfleet derives from Mer-flet, lake-stream. Marton derives from Mer-tun - by a lake. Redmere is from Reed-marsh mere.) Many of these meres disappeared due to human intervention through drainage schemes to provide land for agriculture and grazing. Withow Mere was the furthest east of the three, and the site is now suffering from coastal erosion. Bail Mere separated the castle and the Church of All Saints, and Low Mere was further out towards the north-west of the village. Evidence from the various archaeological surveys have determined that Withow Mere was at some point possibly connected to Bail and Low Meres via a narrow channel feeding into Withow Gap, the stream that was at the western edge of Withow Mere. However, evidence of a ridge between Withow Mere and Skipsea itself, may have proved to be a block against the meres being joined. There is some conjecture that boats could sail through the meres from the sea, right up the edge of the village and to the castle. The name of the village itself, Skipsea, is either Old English (Scip-sæ) or Old Norse (Skip-siōr) meaning the lake for ships, harbour for ships.

All of the meres show the same strata laid down over thousands of years: lacustrine clays, Skipsea Till (silt), peat, and a topsoil most likely due to run-off earth from deforestation. During Medieval times, the various meres in Skipsea (and throughout Holderness), were an important source of food for those living around them. The eels in Skipsea Mere were recorded in the 14th century as being worthwhile to fish and sell them on, and as late as 1790, even when many of the 50 or so meres in Holderness had been drained, it was still possible to take many ducks for food.

=== Skipsea Bail Mere ===
Located at TA158558, the Skipsea Bail Mere (also known as the Mere of Skipsea or Skipsea Mere), afforded Skipsea Castle a defensive protection and was also on the western and northern side of the Church of All Saints in the village. The castle itself is in Skipsea Brough, a hamlet to the west of Skipsea, and part of the defences for the castle were known as bail, which gave the mere its name. A dam was built to the north west of the castle to trap water, with the castle sitting some 50 feet (15 m) above the mere, which some have stated was tidal. Other historiographies have stated that the mere was created entirely as a defence for the castle and as such, was man-made. The castle area was connected to the Church of All Saints by a causeway across the mere. A timber bridge over the mere also connected the keep with the bail gate, which was due south of the castle itself. Archaeological investigations have located the remains of the timber harbour used by the castle to transfer goods from ships.

Studies conducted on the pollen from Bail Mere have determined that the temperature in the immediate post-glacial age was about 2°C warmer than at present. Due to the mere's potential for further study, it has been designated as an SSSI. The Bail Mere was sometimes referred to as Skipsea Mere, and was also known to be the fishery for the castle. Most of the catch of eels and fish was recorded as having been sold on to the local area. The mere was drained in the early 18th century, (c. 1720) and the land reclaimed for agriculture.

=== Skipsea Low Mere ===
Located at TA149566. This mere may have been connected to Bail Mere through a channel providing drainage to the sea towards the north, then the east. This channel follows the line of what is now the Barmston and Skipsea drain. The Low Mere was the furthest away from Skipsea itself, and was about 25 feet (7.5 m) above sea level before it was drained.

=== Skipsea Withow Mere ===
Located at TA185545, the name of this mere dates back to the 13th century, when the name Whythow was recorded. The name means marsh near the white hill. However, it has also been recorded as Fwitthouker, Fitbouker, and White Hole Carr.

The site of Skipsea Withow Mere is actively being eroded by the wave action of tides from the North Sea. Bones recovered from the eastern edge of Skipsea Withow Mere, have been determined to be of red deer (cervus elaphus) from the Mesolithic era. The archaeological survey of the area considered the bones were not there due to natural death, but more likely cast into the mere after human predation. Studies of the stratigraphy at the site of the mere indicated that it was 6 feet 7 inches (2 m)–9.8 feet (3 m) deep in the Late-Devensian period, and stretched to over 174 feet (53 m) in a north/south alignment at its widest point.

Withow Mere was to the south east of Skipsea itself and was separated from the Bail Mere by a ridge south of the village. The outflow from the mere, known as Withow Hole, was some 400 yards (370 m) east of the present day coastline (now the North Sea) and the mere itself occupied a stretch of land that has been lost to coastal erosion since 1750.
