= Hindringham =

Village in Norfolk, England

Coordinates: 52.88664°N 0.948°E

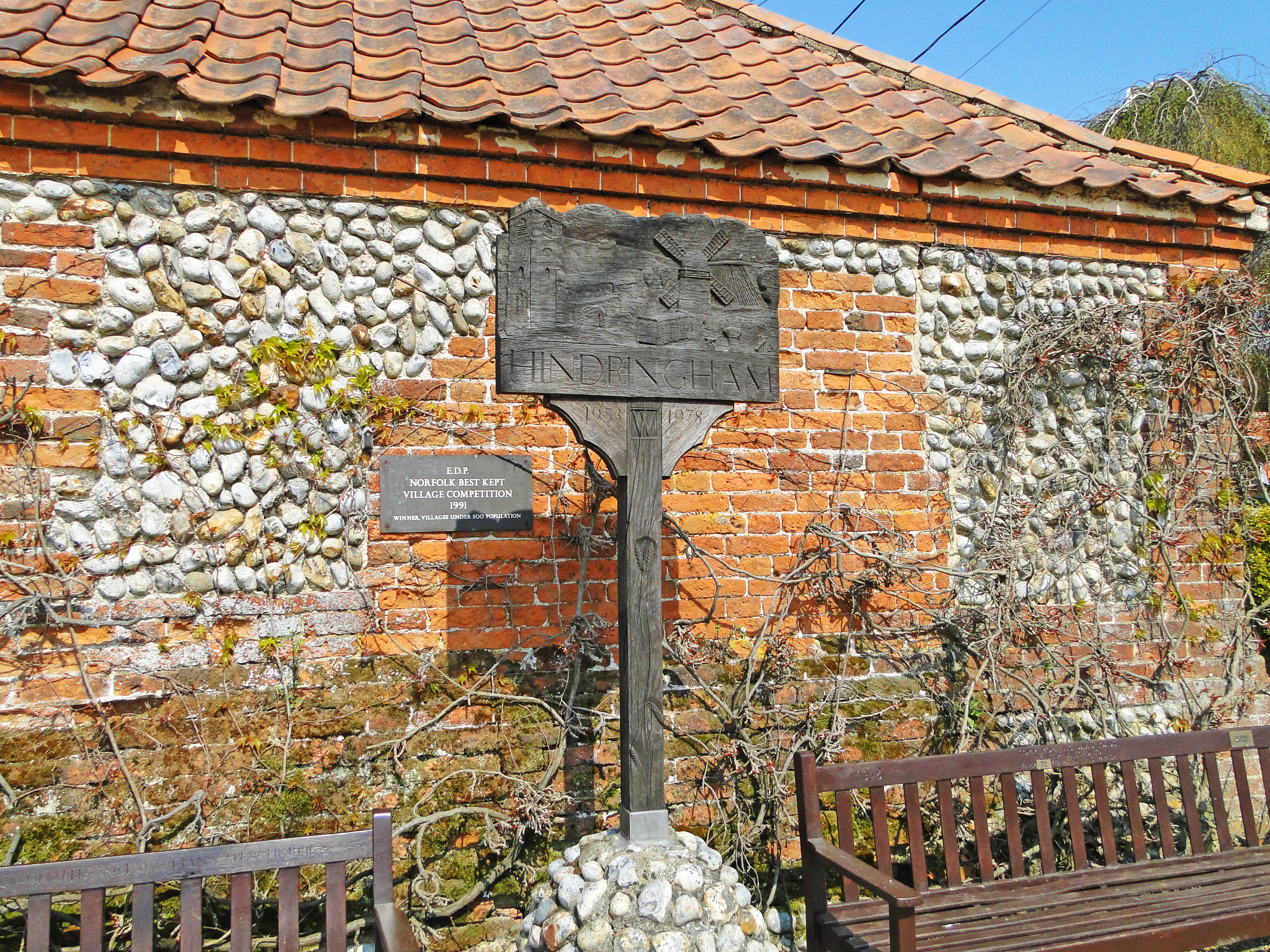
- Hindringham Village Sign

- Location within Norfolk
- Area: 5.30 sq mi (13.7 km^{2})
- Population: 465 (2021 census)
  - Density: 88/sq mi (34/km^{2})
  - London: 122 miles (196 km)
- Civil parish: Hindringham
- District: North Norfolk
- Shire county: Norfolk
- Region: East
- Country: England
- Sovereign state: United Kingdom
- Post town: FAKENHAM
- Postcode district: NR21
- Dialling code: 01328
- UK Parliament: North Norfolk

Hindringham is a village and a civil parish in the English county of Norfolk.

Hindringham is located 8.5 miles (13.7 km) north-east of Fakenham and 23 miles (37 km) north-west of Norwich.

== History ==
Hindringham's name is of Anglo-Saxon origin and derives from the Old English for the settlement of the people living behind the hills.

In the Domesday Book, Hindringham is listed as a settlement of 49 households in the hundred of North Greenhoe. In 1086, the village was divided between the East Anglian estates of William de Beaufeu, King William I, Osbern FitzOsbern and Drogo de la Beuvrière.

The Duke's Head pub was open in the village from 1784 to 1954 and was the scene of regular cockfights.

Lower Green tower mill was built in the 19th century and closed in 1900, being converted into a private dwelling.

== Geography ==
According to the 2021 census, Hindringham had a population of 465 people, an increase from the 457 people recorded in the 2011 census.

== St. Martin's Church ==
Hindringham's parish church is dedicated to Saint Martin of Tours and dates from the 14th century. The church is within the village on 'The Street', and has been Grade I listed since 1959. The church is no longer open for Sunday services, but is part of the Waymarker Benefice and is in the care of the National Churches Trust.

St. Martin's was heavily restored in the Victorian era and still holds a 15th century font and a stained-glass window designed by Ward and Hughes depicting the martyrdom of St. Martin. The church also holds a remarkable 12th century chest, which is generally considered to be one of the oldest in England.

== Hindringham Hall ==
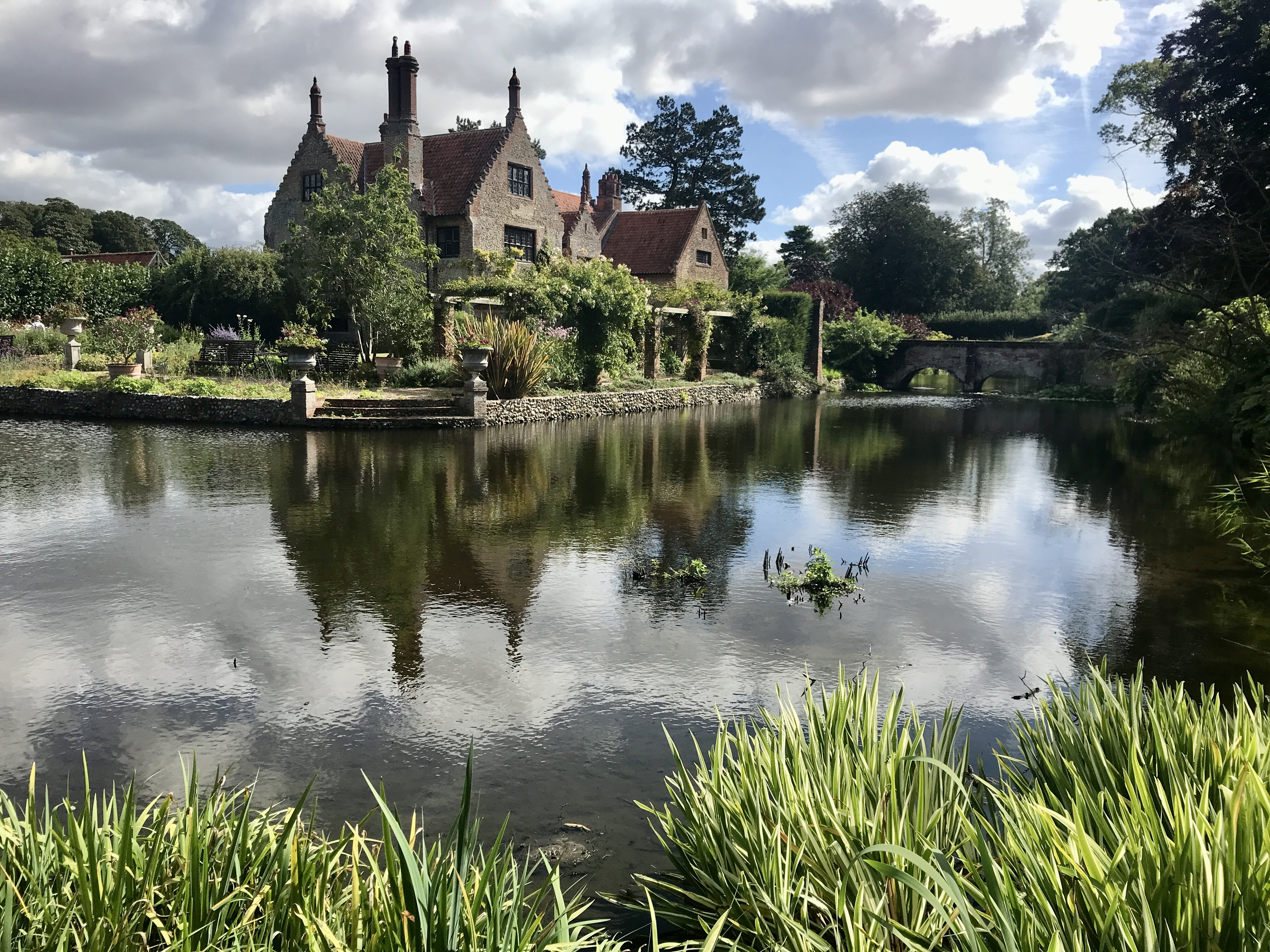
Hindringham Hall, Norfolk.

Hindringham Hall is a 16th-century moated brick and flint house located roughly quarter of a mile to the north-west of the village centre. It was built by Martin Hastings, a courtier in the service of Henry FitzRoy, Duke of Richmond and Somerset, the illegitimate son of Henry VIII by his mistress Elizabeth Blount. A lease written in 1562 refers to the house "now being builded and edified". It had fallen into decline until restored in 1900 by Gerald Gosselin from Bengeo Hall, Hertfordshire. The interior was completely refurbished, the exterior largely being retained.

The moat and associated fish ponds date from the 12th century. The raised ground within the moat originally provided a secure and dry location for farm buildings and storage.

The extensive gardens are the work of the current owners, and include a significant rose collection. They were shortlisted for the Historic Houses 2020 Garden of the Year award. They are open to the public on certain days during the summer months.

=== Hindringham Fish Ponds and Moat ===
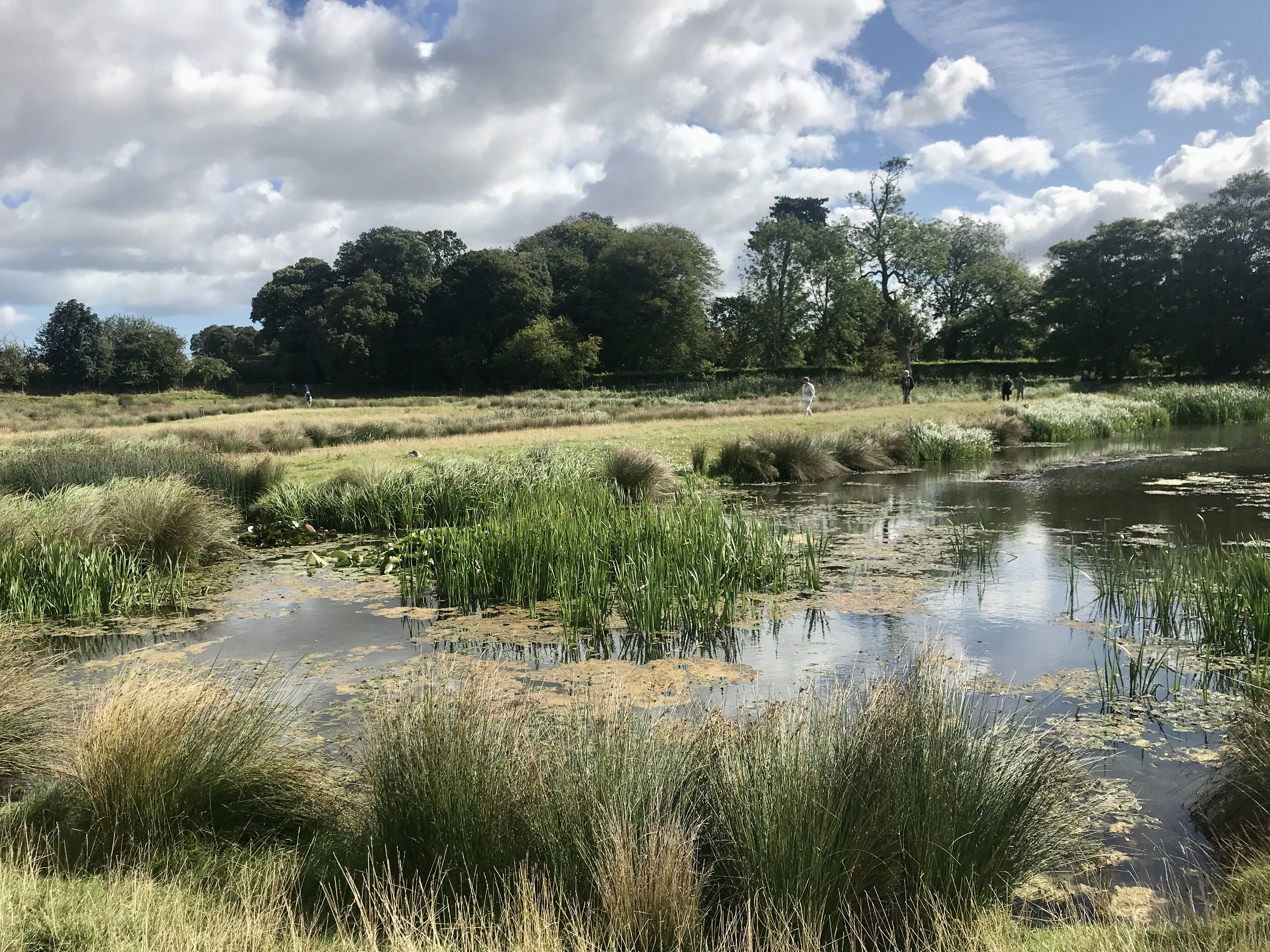
Hindringham Fish Ponds.

The medieval fish ponds on the Hindringham Estate cover 3 acres (1.2 hectares). Although somewhat silted up, they remain amongst the best preserved in East Anglia. The ponds and the moat are fed from the River Stiffkey, a chalk stream running through the grounds.

They were built, along with the moat, in around 1150 and their construction would have required moving around 50,000 m^{3} of soil, an enterprise likely occupying 100 men for 3 years.

The ponds were managed by the monks of Norwich Priory, and comprised an important food source for the priory, as well as for the Benedictines at Binham Priory and the Augustinians and Friars at Walsingham (about 5 km or 3 miles to the west), as well as for the thousands of pilgrims who came to Walsingham from all over Europe. Eel, perch and pike were farmed, with European carp introduced later.

It is likely that the ponds were abandoned following the Dissolution of the Monasteries in 1534, but even if not, it is almost certain that they were finally abandoned in the Little Ice Age of the 17th century. However the shortage of labour following the Plague of 1349 may have resulted in their earlier decline.

== Amenities ==
Hindringham Church of England Primary School caters to local children and is part of The Pilgrim Federation. The headmaster is Mr. T. Snowdon.

Hindringham has a popular sports and social club and this acts as the clubhouse for Hindringham FC on matchdays.

== Sports and recreation ==
=== Hindringham FC ===
The village football club, Hindringham F.C. was originally formed in 1910 and re-formed in 1986. The club has worked its way up to senior status in the Football Association National Pyramid since the re-formation.

They were elected from the North East Norfolk League to the Anglian Combination in 1998 and eventually won promotion to the Premier Division from Division 1 in the 2006–07 season and in dramatic fashion. With only a win good enough in their final game away at Sprowston Wanderers, a goal in second half stoppage time sealed a 1–0 victory and a runner's-up spot. Hindringham stayed in the Premier Division for two seasons before finally being relegated in the 2008–09 season. They had been relegated the previous season but the withdrawal of Halvergate United and Lowestoft Town from the division meant that the club stayed in the Premier Division for another season. They have been in Division 1 ever since the 2008-09 relegation.

Hindringham's last home match in front of the old clubhouse was a 6–1 defeat to Norwich St.Johns in Division 1 on 24 April 2010. In May 2010 the old clubhouse was demolished and a new clubhouse opened in March 2011. The clubhouse used to also act as the village pub but is now solely a clubhouse. The building is called 'The Pavilion'.

== Governance ==
Hindringham is part of the electoral ward of Priory for local elections and is part of the district of North Norfolk.

The village's national constituency is North Norfolk, which has been represented by the Liberal Democrat Steff Aquarone MP since 2024.

== War Memorial ==
Hindringham War Memorial is a stone cross with an emblazoned sword of sacrifice in St. Martin's Churchyard. The memorial lists the following names for the First World War:

Rank	Name	Unit	Date of death	Burial/Commemoration
LCpl.	Herbert A. Chasney	1st Bn., Norfolk Regiment	13 Nov. 1916	Bois-Guillaume Cemetery
Pte.	Charles G. Smith	9th Bn., Devonshire Regiment	26 Oct. 1917	Tyne Cot
Pte.	Thomas E. Back	1st Bn., Norfolk Regiment	4 Sep. 1916	Thiepval Memorial
Pte.	Sam W. G. Hall	1st Bn., Norfolk Regt.	4 Sep. 1916	Thiepval Memorial
Pte.	William J. Fenn	2nd Bn., Norfolk Regt.	7 Dec. 1915	Amara War Cemetery
Pte.	Sidney Hudson	9th Bn., Norfolk Regt.	16 Apr. 1918	Haringhe Cemetery
Pte.	George H. Sands	5th Bn., Northamptonshire Regiment	22 Nov. 1916	Faubourg Cemetery
Pte.	Robert H. Wall	7th Bn., Northamptonshire Regt.	21 Mar. 1918	Pozières Memorial
Pte.	Henry H. Haines	4th Bn., Yorkshire Regiment	30 Jul. 1918	Haumont Cemetery
Pte.	Benjamin A. Wyer	6th Bn., Yorkshire Regt.	14 Nov. 1917	Étaples Military Cemetery

The following name was added after the Second World War:

Rank	Name	Unit	Date of death	Burial/Commemoration
FSgt.	Harold E. G. Pugh	No. 115 Squadron RAF (Lancaster)	19 Apr. 1944	St. Martin's Churchyard

== See also ==
- Hindringham Lower Green tower windmill
