= Dringhoe =

Hamlet in the East Riding of Yorkshire, England

Coordinates: 53.976687°N 0.246895°W

- Location within the East Riding of Yorkshire
- OS grid reference: TA150548
  - London: 170 mi (270 km) S
- Civil parish: Skipsea
- Unitary authority: East Riding of Yorkshire
- Ceremonial county: East Riding of Yorkshire
- Region: Yorkshire and the Humber
- Country: England
- Sovereign state: United Kingdom
- Post town: DRIFFIELD
- Postcode district: YO25
- Dialling code: 01262
- Police: Humberside
- Fire: Humberside
- Ambulance: Yorkshire
- UK Parliament: Bridlington and The Wolds

Dringhoe is a hamlet in the East Riding of Yorkshire, England. It is situated approximately 5.5 miles (9 km) north of Hornsea on the B1249 road to the west of Skipsea Brough.

It forms part of the civil parish of Skipsea.

The name Dringhoe derives from the Old English dreng meaning a 'free tenant' and the Old Norse haugr meaning 'mound or hill'.

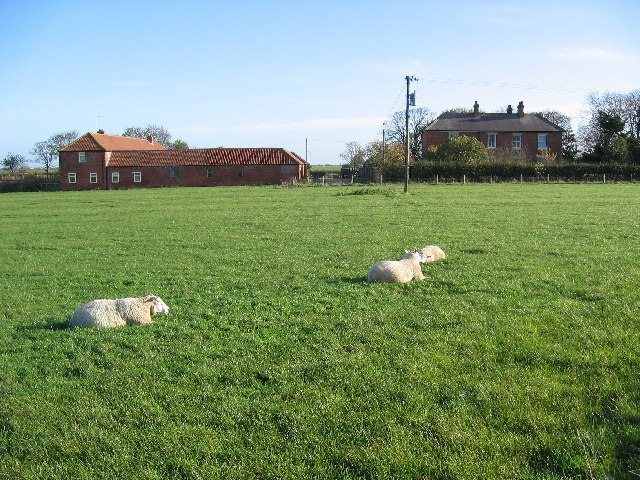
Manor house
