= Barmston Old Hall =

Building in the East Riding of Yorkshire, England

- Location within East Riding of Yorkshire

General information
- Location: Sands Lane, Barmston, East Riding of Yorkshire, England
- Coordinates: 54°00′44″N 0°14′16″W
- Year built: Late 17th century (probable)
- Renovated: 19th century (added)

Listed Building – Grade II*
- Official name: Old Hall
- Designated: 11 January 1952
- Reference no.: 1204832

Scheduled monument
- Official name: Medieval complex at Barmston Old Hall, including two moated sites, a pond, three fishponds and associated enclosures with part of a field system
- Designated: 20 November 1967
- Reference no.: 1007846

Barmston Old Hall is a historic building on Sands Lane in Barmston, East Riding of Yorkshire, a village in England.

A manor house in Barmston was first recorded in 1297, and waterworks including a moat survive from this period. The earliest part of the current building is the left wing, which may be 16th century, while the bulk of the house was rebuilt in the late 17th century. In the mid-18th century, most of the house was demolished, and the remaining section became a farmhouse. In the 19th century, a new wing was added at the rear. The building was Grade II* listed in 1952, while the waterworks and associated enclosures and field system are a scheduled monument.

The house is built of pinkish-red brick, with cobbles, stone dressings, and a pantile roof. It consists of a min range with two storeys, a basement and attics, and a lower two-storey range to the left. The main range has a chamfered plinth, quoins, a shaped modillion eaves band, and a swept roof with stone copings, a ball finial, and tumbled-in brickwork on the left gable. On the front are two doorways with divided fanlight in panelled recesses. Most of the windows are mullioned and transomed.

== See also ==
- Grade II* listed buildings in the East Riding of Yorkshire
- Listed buildings in Barmston, East Riding of Yorkshire
