= A165 road =

Road in Yorkshire, England

A165

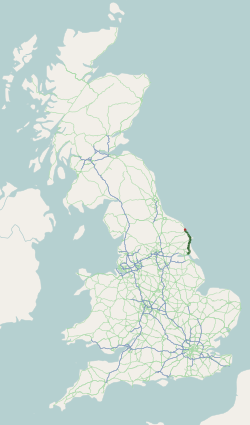

Route information
- Length: 50.1 mi (80.6 km)

Major junctions
- North end: Burniston; 54.3214°N 0.4435°W
- A171; A64 A1039 A614 A1038 A1035 A1033 A1165 A1079
- South end: Kingston upon Hull; 53.7485°N 0.3467°W; 53.7458°N 0.3262°W

Location
- Country: United Kingdom
- Primary destinations: Bridlington

Road network
- Roads in the United Kingdom; Motorways; A and B road zones

The A165 is a road that links Scarborough and Kingston upon Hull, both in Yorkshire, England. The road is designated as a Primary Route from its junction with the A64 in Scarborough to its southern terminus in Hull.

== History ==
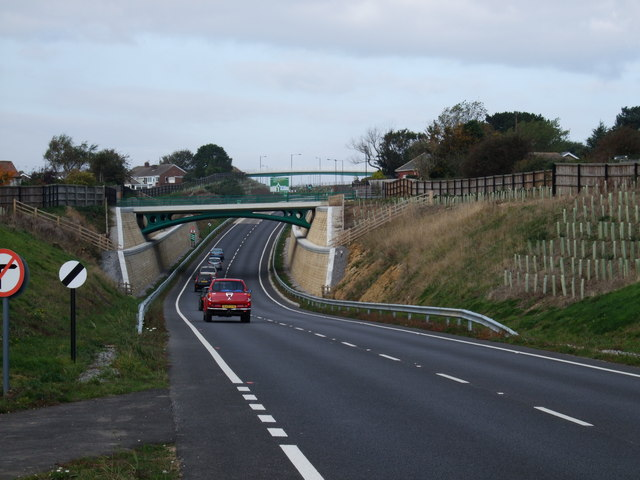
New A165 by-pass, Osgodby.

The route follows partly that of two of the Turnpikes in the area in the 18th century. In 1767, the Bridlington to White Cross Turnpike was established by Act of Parliament and the modern road follows this old route from Bridlington as far as the junction of current A165 and A1035. The modern road also follows part of the Hull-Preston-Hedon Turnpike that was established in 1745, from the point where it is known as Holderness Road in Hull to the river. Where North Bridge now stands there used to be a ferry to link the Holderness Road to the Hessle and Beverley roads as far back as 1305.

=== Road developments ===
In 1999, Scarborough Borough Council made plans to improve several sections of the A165. These included diverting the route of the road away from Filey Road along a new route starting at the entrance to Scarborough Golf Club to a new roundabout outside the village of Lebberston. This work was completed in December 2008. The new route included a new roundabout at Osgodby and at the Cayton Bay Holiday Camp. Also included was a separate piece of work to improve the roundabout at Reighton.

== Route ==
The details in this section are taken from Ordnance Survey Open Viewer and Hull City Council.

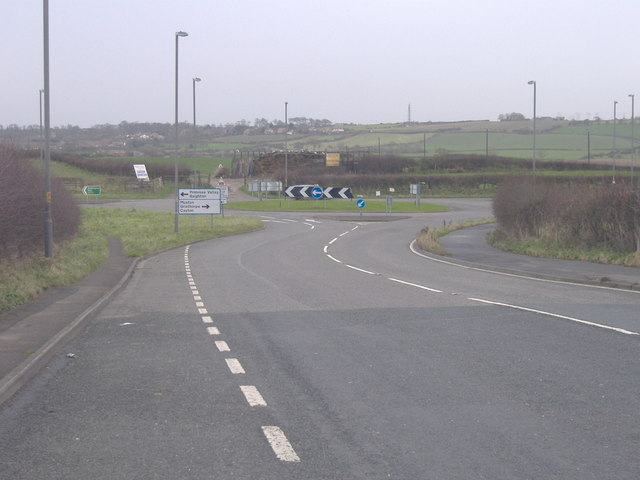
Roundabout coming out of Filey

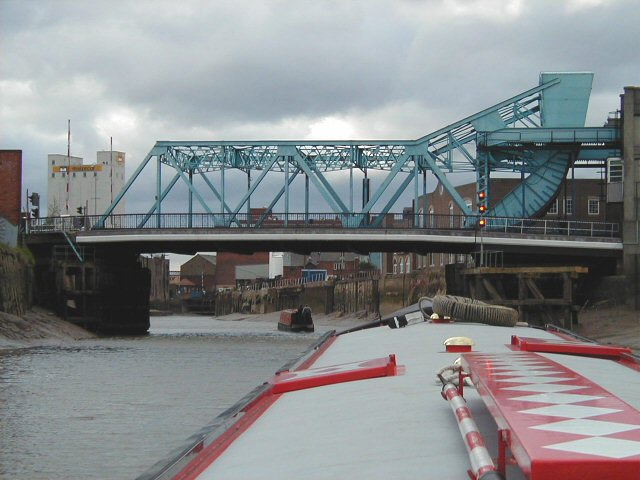
A165 running over North Bridge in Kingston upon Hull

From the northern terminus of the road, at the junction with the A171 in Burniston, the route goes through the northern suburbs of Scarborough, and past Peasholme Park before heading to the town centre. The road forms the eastern terminus of the A64 near to Scarborough Rail Station. The road exits Scarborough along a new route, parallel to the old Filey Road route, past the villages of Osgodby, Cayton Bay, Lebberston and Gristhorpe before becoming the Filey bypass. The old route used to go into the town centre and rejoin the current route at the junction with the A1039 road. The A1039 now merges with the A165 for a short distance. The road continues through open countryside until it reaches the outskirts of Bridlington.

The route diverts away from the original road that went into the town centre, now the A1038, and instead goes around the western side to the junction with the A164 near Bridlington Hospital. It turns towards the town centre here until it reaches the junction with the old route at Kingsgate. The road then exits the town in a south-west direction. The road goes through open countryside again, passing the villages of Fraisthorpe, Barmston, Lissett, Beeford, Brandesburton and Leven. At Leven, the road merges with the A1035 forming the bypass to the village of Leven. At the roundabout with Beverley Road, the two roads separate and the A165 continues southward through Long Riston. It then passes through Skirlaugh, Coniston and Ganstead before reaching the outskirts of Hull.

Within the city limits the A165 is first known as Holderness Road which it follows all the way into the centre crossing the A1033 (Mount Pleasant). According to the Road Classifying Authority for Hull City Council, at the junction of Witham and Clarence Street, the road splits. One section continues on Witham crossing the A1165 (New Cleveland Street/Great Union Street) and the River Hull over the Grade II listed North Bridge in George Street (a Scherzer rolling lift bridge). It then becomes Freetown Way before terminating at the A1079 (Beverley Road/Ferensway) junction. The other section continues down Clarence Street to terminate at the junction with the A1165 on Great Union Street.

== Speed limits ==
Much of the road is through countryside, and has the National speed limit (60 miles per hour (97 km/h)) applied. A 3.5 miles (5.6 km) stretch of the road passing the village of Leven in East Yorkshire (known as the Leven bypass) is dual carriageway, carrying a 70 miles per hour (110 km/h) speed limit. The road does pass through many villages and settlements, where the limit is reduced. A 30 miles per hour (48 km/h) speed limit is in operation through Beeford, Bridlington, Filey, Skirlaugh. A 40 miles per hour (64 km/h) limit exists through other villages such as Fraisthorpe and Coniston. In Scarborough, Bridlington, and the Kingston upon Hull boundary, the limit is 30 miles per hour (48 km/h) or 40 miles per hour (64 km/h). Some stretches of 30 miles per hour (48 km/h) or 40 miles per hour (64 km/h) limits are monitored at certain times by mobile speed cameras, operated by Safer Roads Humber.

== Safety ==
In the European Road Assessment Programme (EuroRAP) survey, which gives all major roads in Europe a safety rating, the A165 is categorised as 'Medium-high risk'.
