= Listed buildings in Ulrome =

Ulrome is a civil parish in the county of the East Riding of Yorkshire, England. It contains five listed buildings that are recorded in the National Heritage List for England. All the listed buildings are designated at Grade II, the lowest of the three grades, which is applied to "buildings of national importance and special interest". The parish contains the villages of Ulrome and Lissett, and the surrounding countryside. The listed buildings consist of two churches, a house, a farmhouse, and a former workshop and adjoining barn.

== Buildings ==
Name and location	Photograph	Date	Notes
St James' Church, Lissett; 54.00593°N 0.25539°W		c. 1120	The church has ben altered and extended through the centuries, especially during a restoration by Hugh Roumieu Gough. It is built in pebbledashed cobble and brick, partly exposed to reveal pinkish-red brick and pebbles, with stone dressings and a tile roof. The church consists of a nave with a south porch, and a lower narrower chancel. On the east end of the nave is a double bellcote with two round arches. The south doorway is Norman, with a round arch, plain jambs with moulded capitals, and lozenges and zigzag moulding on the arch.
St Andrew's Church; 53.99388°N 0.22981°W		Medieval	Most of the church was rebuilt in 1876–77 re-using material from an earlier church on the site, and the top stage of the tower and the roof were added in 1904. It is built in stone, with dressings in brick and stone, and has a Welsh slate roof. The church consists of a nave with a south porch, a chancel with a north vestry, and a west tower. The tower has two stages, round-arched openings in the lower stage, a band, a south clock face, two-light bell openings in round arches, a string course, a low parapet and a pyramidal roof. Most of the windows on the body of the church are lancets.
Manor Farmhouse; 54.00571°N 0.25608°W	—	Early 17th century (probable)	The farmhouse, which has been extended, is in stuccoed and colourwashed brick and cobble, with stepped eaves on the right, and an asphalted slate roof. There are two storeys, a two-bay range on the left, and a lower two-storey longer two-bay range on the right. The doorway has a fanlight and a wedge lintel. The windows on the left range are sashes under wedge lintels, and on the right range are casement windows with wooden mullions.
Manor House; 53.99276°N 0.23111°W	—	Early to mid-18th century (probable)	The house is in pinkish-brown brick, with a floor band, and a pantile roof with brick copings and tumbled-in brick on the gable end. There are two storeys, a main range of four bays, and a single-storey two-bay range on the right. On the main range is a doorway and sash windows, and on the right range are a doorway, a stable door and a fixed window.
The Old Joiners' Shop and barn 53.99213°N 0.23078°W		Mid-18th century (probable)	The joiner's shop, later a house, is in pinkish-brown brick, with a floor band, and a swept pantile roof with brick copings. The entrance is on the rear, and on the front are three-light casement windows under cambered arches with shutters. To the left is a wall linking with a projecting barn in brick and pebble. This contains two blocked cart entrances, one with an elliptical arch, and on the right return is an inserted bow window.
