= Listed buildings in Barmston, East Riding of Yorkshire =

Barmston is a civil parish in the county of the East Riding of Yorkshire, England. It contains 14 listed buildings that are recorded in the National Heritage List for England. Of these, one is listed at Grade I, the highest of the three grades, one is at Grade II*, the middle grade, and the others are at Grade II, the lowest grade. The parish contains the villages of Barmston and Fraisthorpe and the surrounding countryside. The listed buildings consist of a church, houses, farmhouses and a farm building, former almshouses, a chapel, and five pillboxes from the First World War.

== Key ==
Grade	Criteria
I	Buildings of exceptional interest, sometimes considered to be internationally important
II*	Particularly important buildings of more than special interest
II	Buildings of national importance and special interest

== Buildings ==
Name and location	Photograph	Date	Notes	Grade
All Saints' Church; 54.01279°N 0.23658°W		12th century	The church has been altered and extended through the centuries. It is built in cobble and stone with a Welsh slate roof, and consists of a nave, a south aisle, a south porch, a chancel and a west tower. The tower has two stages, a two-light Perpendicular west window with a moulded hood mould, a moulded stage band, two-light bell openings, and a pierced embattled parapet.	I
Old Hall; 54.01223°N 0.23785°W	—	Late 17th century (probable)	The house, on a moated site, has been altered and extended through the years. It is in pinkish-red brick, with cobbles, stone dressings, and a pantile roof. It consists of a min range with two storeys, a basement and attics, and a lower two-storey range to the left. The main range has a chamfered plinth, quoins, a shaped modillion eaves band, and a swept roof with stone copings, a ball finial, and tumbled-in brickwork on the left gable. On the front are two doorways with divided fanlight in panelled recesses. Most of the windows are mullioned and transomed.	II*
Barmston House; 54.01424°N 0.22966°W	—	Late 17th to early 18th century	A rectory, later a private house, that has been extended. It is in colourwashed brick with roofs of pantile and Welsh slate, and is in three ranges. The main range has three storeys and three bays, and a rear stair turret, to the left is a range of two storeys and two bays, and further to the left is a single-storey two-bay wing. In the centre of the main range is a projecting porch, and a doorway with fluted pilasters, a divided fanlight, and an open pediment. The middle range has stepped eaves and a 20th-century doorway, and the roof of the wing is hipped on the left. There is one casement window, and the other windows are sashes.	II
Manor Farmhouse, Fraisthorpe; 54.03998°N 0.24070°W	—	Late 17th to early 18th century (probable)	The farmhouse is in pinkish-red brick, whitewashed on the front, with a floor band of chamfered brick in rubbed modillions, a cogged band below the eaves, and a swept pantile roof with brick copings. There are two storeys and three bays. The doorway has a fanlight, and the windows are sashes, one horizontally sliding. On the gable ends are bands, the left gable has a horizontally sliding sash window, and the right gable has a casement window, both windows with triangular pediments.	II
Red Roofs and Pantiles; 54.01472°N 0.22876°W		1726	A row of four almshouses, later two cottages, in colourwashed brick, with a stepped eaves band and a swept pantile roof with brick kneelers and copings. There is a single storey with attics, and six bays. The doorways are on the outer parts, between are three casement windows and thee horizontally sliding sash windows, and there are two raking dormers.	II
51 Sands Lane; 54.01544°N 0.22498°W		Mid to late 18th century	The house is in reddish-orange brick, with stepped eaves, and a swept pantile roof with lead-covered brick copings. There is a single storey and attics, three bays, and a rear range. The doorway is on the left bay, the windows are horizontally sliding sashes, and there are three raking dormers.	II
Cattle shed, Manor Farmhouse, Barmston; 54.01480°N 0.22799°W	—	Mid to late 18th century	The cattle shed is in herringbone cobble with brick galleting, and red brick, with a dentilled eaves course, and a pantile roof with brick copings and tumbled-in brick to the right gable end. On the right gable end is a cart entrance, and the other sides are blank.	II
Manor Farmhouse, Barmston; 54.01492°N 0.22732°W		1768	The farmhouse is in pinkish-brown brick with dentilled eaves bands, and a swept pantile roof with tumbled-in brickwork on the gable ends, and lead-covered brick copings. There are two storeys, three bays, and a lean-to outshut on the left with a hipped roof. The doorway has a reeded architrave with a hood, and the windows are sashes, those on the ground floor with wedge lintels. Between the floors is a datestone.	II
St Edmund's Chapel; 54.03832°N 0.23915°W		1893	The chapel was rebuilt incorporating some 13th-century material. It is built in cobble and stone, with quoins, sprocketed eaves, and a tile roof with stone coped gables and crested ridged tiles. It consists of a four-bay nave and chancel in one. On the west gable is a bracketed bellcote with a moulded semicircular opening and a gabled top. On the south front is a pointed doorway with moulded imposts, and the windows are chamfered lancets. All the openings have hood moulds and relieving arches.	II
Pillbox BA10; 54.04775°N 0.21658°W	—	1917 (probable)	The pillbox, to the east of Auburn Farm, is in reinforced concrete, it has a rectangular plan and the roof is a flat concrete slab. The entrance is in the west wall, and in the east wall are three gun embrasures.	II
Pillbox BA19; 54.04701°N 0.21678°W	—	1917 (probable)	The pillbox, to the southeast of Auburn Farm, is in reinforced concrete, it has a rectangular plan and the roof is a flat concrete slab. There are entrances on the east and west sides, and in the north and south walls are gun embrasures.	II
Pillbox BA22; 54.04654°N 0.21876°W	—	1917 (probable)	The pillbox, to the southwest of Auburn Farm, is in reinforced concrete, and has a square plan. The entrance is in the west wall, and the other walls each have one narrow splayed rifle embrasure.	II
Pillbox BA30a; 54.04352°N 0.21622°W	—	1917 (probable)	The pillbox, to the south of Auburn Farm, is in reinforced concrete, and has a square plan. The doorway is in the northwest wall, and in the southwest and southeast walls are narrow splayed rifle embrasures.	II
Pillbox BA30b; 54.04348°N 0.21626°W	—	1917 (probable)	The pillbox, to the south of Auburn Farm, is in reinforced concrete, and has a square plan. The doorway is in the northwest wall, and in the northeast and southeast walls are narrow splayed rifle embrasures.	II
