= Fraisthorpe Wind Farm =

Wind power site in Yorkshire, England

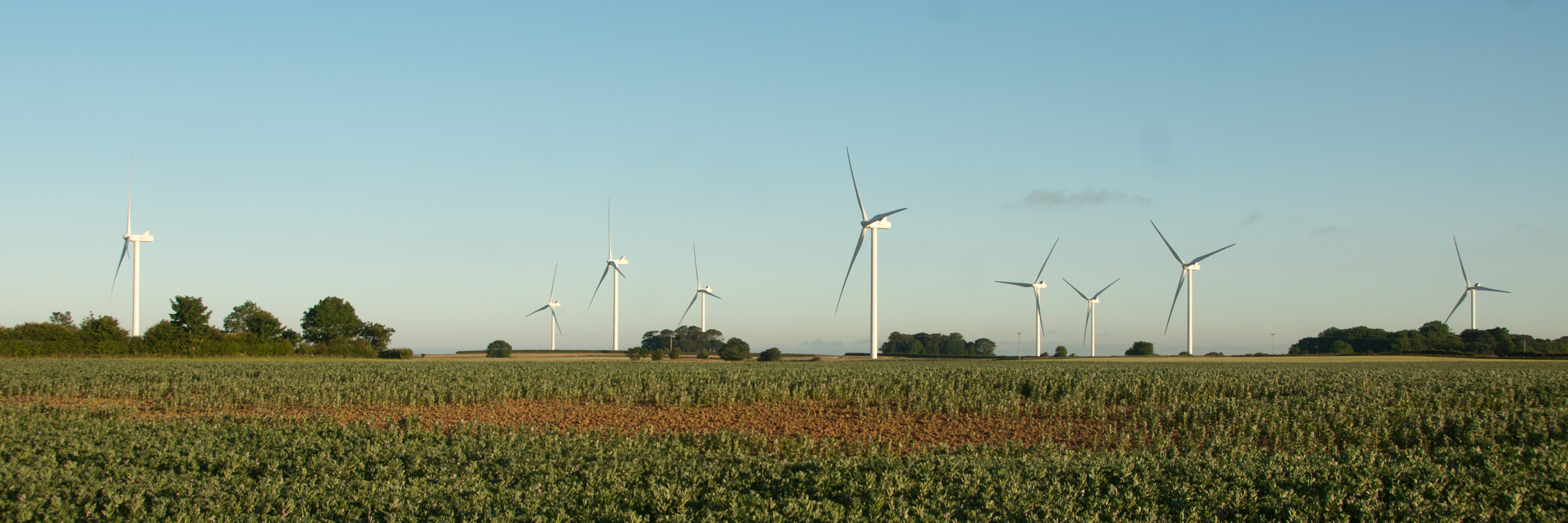
- The nine turbines near Fraisthorpe, East Riding of Yorkshire
- Fraisthorpe Wind Farm in the East Riding of Yorkshire
- Country: England
- Location: Fraisthorpe, Bridlington, East Riding of Yorkshire
- Coordinates: 54°03′02″N 0°13′46″W
- Construction began: March 2015
- Commission date: August 2016
- Owner: Octopus Investments
- Operator: BayWa

Wind farm
- Type: Onshore
- Hub height: 420 feet (130 m)

Power generation
- Make and model: V112-3.3 MW
- Units planned: Nine
- Nameplate capacity: 29.7 MW

Fraisthorpe Wind Farm is a wind power generating site located in the village of Fraisthorpe in the East Riding of Yorkshire, England. The site is just 2 miles (3.2 km) south of Bridlington and 40 miles (64 km) east of York. It was granted full planning permission in early 2015 when the Ministry of Defence dropped their objection to the site. This was despite the apparent vocal opposition by local people and councillors. It started generating electricity in August 2016.

== History ==
The site was initially proposed to house nine turbines by TCI Renewables in 2012. The venture was bought up by BayWa in December 2014. (Note: Stylised as BayWa r.e., with the r.e standing for Renewable Energy) Initial approval for the nine 420 feet (130 m) turbines and an associated 260-foot (80 m) meteorological mast was granted in January 2013.

Objections were listed from local councillors, residents and the Ministry of Defence. The latter were worried about the impact that the turbine blades would have on one of its radars on the Yorkshire coast. David Hockney, who has painted many scenes along the East Yorkshire Coast and the Yorkshire Wolds, said that the venture would "deface the landscape and the seafront of Bridlington Bay." Hockney was moved enough to pen a letter to the public enquiry into the wind farm in December 2012. Local objectors also pointed out that there are twelve turbines on the horizon at nearby Lissett Airfield and others with planning permission. One resident stated that in Fraisthorpe, there would be more wind turbines than homes. One of the civic societies based in Bridlington objected on principle that the wind farm would prevent people from visiting what they termed as "Hockney Country". (Note: Hockney Country is defined as an area of the East Riding of Yorkshire, specifically the Wolds. Hockney had a studio at Bridlington and painted many scenes of woodland and farmland in the area and has acquired the nickname of Hockney Country in the same vein that parts of East Anglia have been termed as Constable Country.)

In 2015, the Ministry of Defence dropped its objection to the wind farm being constructed. It was initially thought that the farm might interfere with the operations of RRH Staxton Wold further up the coast near to Scarborough. The MoD has been involved in the planning stage of some major projects across the eastern part of Yorkshire; a similar scheme in Bempton was objected to by the MoD which was then denied permission by councillors, and the siting of Woodsmith Mine near to RAF Fylingdales meant a protracted inquiry process. After a new radar that would not be affected by the wind farm had been installed at Staxton Wold in 2015, the MoD removed its objection. After this, construction on the site started soon afterwards in March 2015. The construction company installed over 3,107 miles (5,000 km) of cabling and had to drill underneath and jack-up the nearby Yorkshire Coast railway line.

The turbines themselves were shipped to Immingham Dock and the 197 feet (60 m) turbine blades were delivered to the site by a circuitous 100-mile (160 km) journey avoiding the Humber Bridge as they were unable to take that particular route due to safety concerns.

The site consists of nine 3.3 MW wind turbines that produce a collective 29.7 MW of power. The farm provides enough electricity to power over 22,000 homes and stops over 48,000 tonnes (53,000 tons) of carbon dioxide gas from entering the environment.

The wind farm was powered up in August 2016, with BayWa selling the site three-months later to Octopus Investments. BayWa continues to operate and service the site as part of the deal.

== See also ==
- List of onshore wind farms in the United Kingdom
