= Listed buildings in Skipsea =

Skipsea is a civil parish in the county of the East Riding of Yorkshire, England. It contains five listed buildings that are recorded in the National Heritage List for England. Of these, one is listed at Grade I, the highest of the three grades, and the others are at Grade II, the lowest grade. The parish contains the village of Skipsea and the surrounding countryside, and the listed buildings consist of a church, three houses and a war memorial.

== Key ==
Grade	Criteria
I	Buildings of exceptional interest, sometimes considered to be internationally important
II	Buildings of national importance and special interest

== Buildings ==
Name and location	Photograph	Date	Notes	Grade
All Saints' Church; 53.97771°N 0.22429°W		11th century	The church has been extended and altered through the centuries, including a restoration and alterations by James Fowler in 1865–66. It is built in cobble with stone and brick dressings, the south aisle is in magnesian limestone, and the roof is slated. The church consists of a nave with a clerestory, north and south aisles, a south porch, a chancel, and a west tower. The tower has three stages, a chamfered plinth, diagonal buttresses, a three-light pointed west window, slit windows, a band, two-light bell openings, and a low parapet.	I
Dringhoe Hall; 53.97824°N 0.24995°W		Mid to late 17th century	The house is in pinkish-red brick on a high plinth, with a modillion eaves band, and a pantile roof with tumbled-in brick to the gable ends and brick copings. The doorway has a reeded architrave. The windows are a mix of casements and tripartite sashes, most under wedge lintels. On the right gable end is a three-light horizontally sliding sash window and a partly blocked pitching door.	II
Skipsea Grange; 53.96774°N 0.20711°W	—	Late 18th century	The house is in reddish-brown brick, and has a swept pantile roof with tumbled-in brick to the gable ends and brick copings. There are two storeys and three bays. The central doorway has pilasters, a fanlight, a frieze and a cornice. The windows are sashes, those on the ground floor under segmental arches.	II
Church House; 53.97795°N 0.22408°W		Early 19th century	The house is in yellow-brown brick and pebbles, with a cogged eaves band, and a pantile roof with tumbled-in brick to the gables and brick copings. There are two storeys and two bays. The central doorway has a fanlight, the windows are fixed lights, and the ground floor openings are under segmental arches.	II
War memorial 53.97786°N 0.22104°W		1919	The war memorial stands in an enclosure on the Village Green. It consists of an obelisk in polished granite surmounted by an urn, on a chamfered pedestal on a concrete platform. On the pedestal are inscriptions and the names of those lost in the two World Wars.	II
