= Listed buildings in Beeford =

Beeford is a civil parish in the county of the East Riding of Yorkshire, England. It contains five listed buildings that are recorded in the National Heritage List for England. Of these, one is listed at Grade II*, the middle of the three grades, and the others are at Grade II, the lowest grade. The parish contains the village of Beeford and the surrounding countryside, and the listed buildings consist of a church, farmhouses and farm buildings.

== Key ==
Grade	Criteria
II*	Particularly important buildings of more than special interest
II	Buildings of national importance and special interest

== Buildings ==
Name and location	Photograph	Date	Notes	Grade
St Leonard's Church; 53.97316°N 0.28024°W		13th century	The church has been altered and extended through the centuries. It is built in stone, cobble and brick, partly roughcast, and has slate roofs. The church consists of a nave, north and south aisles, a south porch, a chancel with a north vestry and chapel, and a west tower. The tower has three stages, a chamfered plinth, string courses, pinnacled diagonal buttresses, a quatrefoil window on the middle stage, two-light bell openings with pointed heads and hood moulds, and a pierced parapet with eight diagonally-set crocketed pinnacles. On the west front is a three-light Perpendicular window with a hood mould, above which is a niche, with an ogee canopy and a foliated finial, containing a statue. The porch also has an embattled parapet.	II*
Alton Farmhouse and barns 53.97072°N 0.28215°W		Mid-18th century	The buildings are in red brick, and have a stepped eaves cornice and pantile roofs with tumbled-in brick to the raised gables, other than the later rear extension, which has a slate roof. The main house has one storey and three bays. The doorway and the two windows on the front, which are sashes, have architraves, and there is a blocked window. The rear extension has two storeys, two bays, and sash windows with wedge lintels. To the right are two barns containing a lifting door and slit vents.	II
Town Farmhouse; 53.96940°N 0.29203°W	—	Mid-18th century	The farmhouse is in brown brick, with a stepped eaves cornice, and a pantile roof with tumbled-in brick to the raised gables. There are two storeys, three bays, and a rear wing. The doorway is in the centre, and the windows are sash windows, all in architraves; the doorway and ground floor windows have flat gauged brick arches.	II
Barns, Town Farm; 53.96983°N 0.29173°W	—	Mid-18th century	The barns are in brown brick, with a stepped eaves cornice, and a pantile roof with tumbled-in brick to the raised gables with rounded saddles. They form an L-shaped plan, the range facing the street with two storeys and three bays. It contains three pivoted taking-in doors on the upper floor and vents on the ground floor.	II
Woodhouse Farmhouse; 53.98418°N 0.29339°W		Late 18th century	The house is in brick, with stone dressings, and a pantile roof with raised gables. There are two storeys and attics, and three bays. The central doorway has an architrave and a rectangular fanlight, and the windows are sashes with wedge lintels.	II
