= Lower Green Mill, Hindringham =

Windmill in Hindringham, Norfolk, England

Lower Green Mill
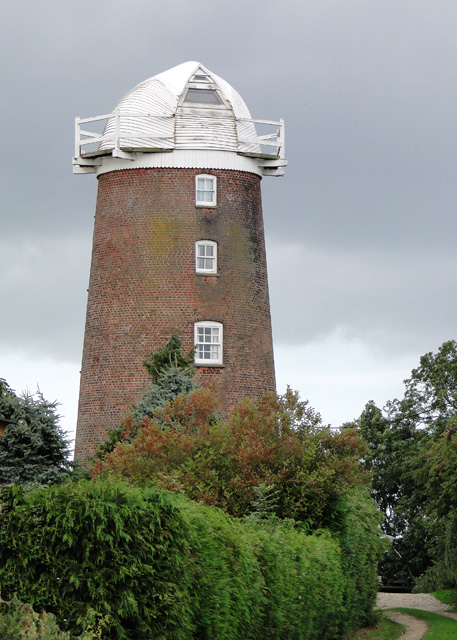
- Interactive map of Lower Green Mill

Origin
- Mill location: north of Hindringham, Norfolk
- Grid reference: TF989375
- Coordinates: 52°53′53″N 0°57′23″E
- Year built: c1844

Lower Green Mill is a tower mill at Lower Green, located to the north of the village of Hindringham in the English county of Norfolk. The mill stands on the east side of the lane between Hindringham and Binham and is four miles east of Walsingham. The structure is a grade II listed building.

== Description ==
The tower is constructed from Norfolk red bricks and has five storeys. On the top of the tower there was a Norfolk clinker boat style cap with a six-bladed fantail. The cap had a gallery and a petticoat around the base of the cap. The mill had four sails with double shutters each with eight bays of three shutters. The sails powered three pairs of millstones, of which one had a diameter of five feet. The internal machinery also included a sifter and a flour mill. Also on site a bakehouse was built in 1862. In March 1860 the windmill was badly damaged in a gale which prompted a 10 horse power Garwood steam engine to be installed to act as auxiliary power.

== History ==
The windmill was built in 1844 and is located on the site of an early post mill. In 1908, after 64 years, Hindringham Lower Green tower windmill ceased working as a mill. In 1920 the windmill was sold by the Gunthorpe Estate and by 1937 the mill had become derelict. In 1970 the mill was sold and renovation work began to turn the windmill into residential use. In 1985 renovation work was carried out again with a new clinker boat-shape cap fitted with a gallery and a window. The windmill is a private residence and is not open to the public at the present time.
