= St Leonard's Church, Beeford =

Church in Beeford, East Riding of Yorkshire, England

Coordinates: 53.9732°N 0.2804°W

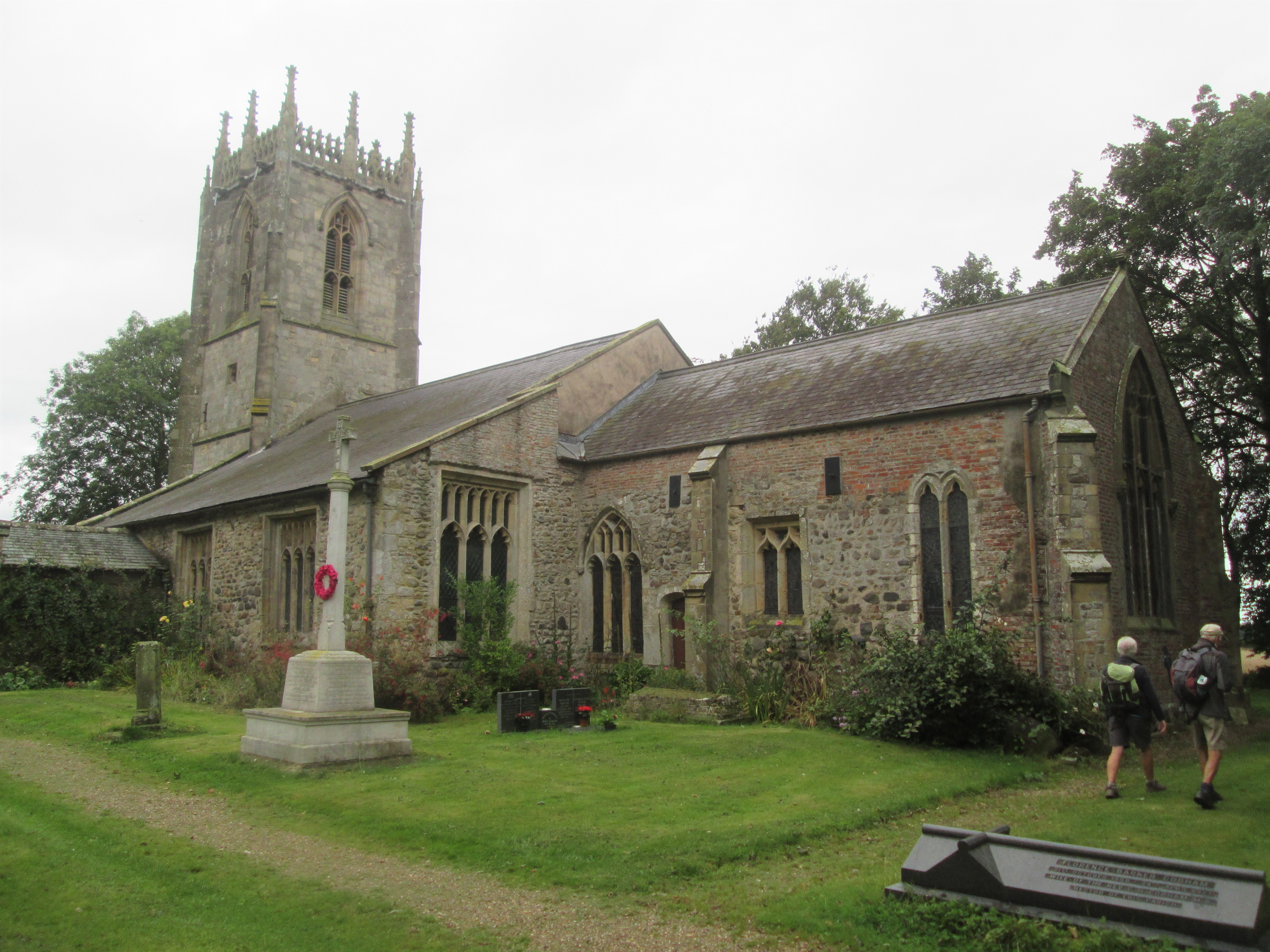
The church, in 2020

St Leonard's Church is the parish church of Beeford, a village in the East Riding of Yorkshire, in England.

The church may have been constructed in the 11th century, but little survives which is earlier than the 13th century. The aisles, south porch and west tower were added in the 15th century, and the chancel was remodelled. In 1719, part of the chancel was rebuilt in brick, and some of the windows were replaced. A west gallery was added by 1831, then in 1846 a north aisle and north chapel were added, to a design by H. F. Lockwood. A vestry was added in 1859, and the interior was refitted later in the century. In 1939, a ceiling was inserted, and most of the glazing was replaced with clear glass. The church was grade II* listed in 1966.

The church is built of stone, cobble and brick, partly roughcast, and has slate roofs. The church consists of a nave, north and south aisles, a south porch, a chancel with a north vestry and chapel, and a west tower. The tower has three stages, a chamfered plinth, string courses, pinnacled diagonal buttresses, a quatrefoil window on the middle stage, two-light bell openings with pointed heads and hood moulds, and a pierced parapet with eight diagonally-set crocketed pinnacles. On the west front is a three-light Perpendicular window with a hood mould, above which is a niche, with an ogee canopy and a foliated finial, containing a statue. The porch also has an embattled parapet. Inside, there is a 13th-century sedilia with a trefoil head, an octagonal 15th-century font, and a 14th-century effigy of a priest under a canopy.

== See also ==
- Grade II* listed buildings in the East Riding of Yorkshire
- Listed buildings in Beeford
