= Ulrome =

Village in the East Riding of Yorkshire, England

Coordinates: 53°59′40″N 0°13′30″W

- Location within the East Riding of Yorkshire
- Population: 239 (2011 census)
- OS grid reference: TA164568
- Civil parish: Ulrome
- Unitary authority: East Riding of Yorkshire
- Ceremonial county: East Riding of Yorkshire
- Region: Yorkshire and the Humber
- Country: England
- Sovereign state: United Kingdom
- Post town: DRIFFIELD
- Postcode district: YO25
- Dialling code: 01262
- Police: Humberside
- Fire: Humberside
- Ambulance: Yorkshire
- UK Parliament: Bridlington and The Wolds

Ulrome is a village and civil parish in the East Riding of Yorkshire, England. It is situated approximately 6 miles (9.7 km) north of the town of Hornsea and on the east side of the B1242 road. The parish includes the village of Lissett. Its area is 1,139.535 hectares (2,815.85 acres), in 2011 had a population of 239, a reduction on the 2001 UK census figure of 260.

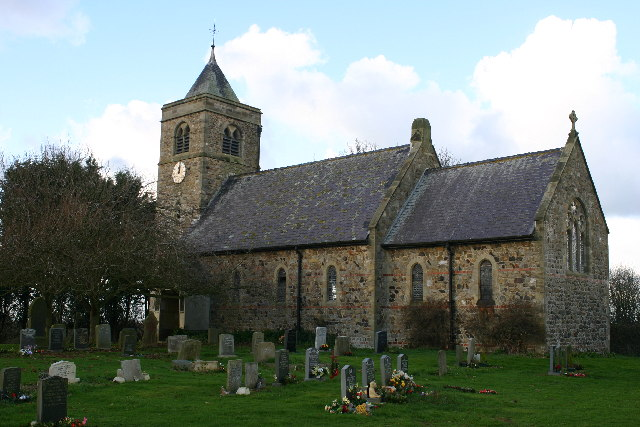
St Andrews Church

St Andrew's Church, Ulrome is a Grade II listed building.

The name Ulrome probably derives from the Old English Wulfherehām meaning 'Wulfhere's village'.

== Civil parish ==
Although the civil parish is called "Ulrome" its parish council is called "Lissett & Ulrome Parish Council". On 1 April 1935 Lissett parish was abolished and merged with Ulrome, the parish also gained part of Barmston.

Cables from the offshore 2.4 GW Dogger Bank Wind Farm make landfall to the north of Ulrome.

== See also ==
- Listed buildings in Ulrome
