= Chadstone, Northamptonshire =

Hamlet in Northamptonshire, England

Coordinates: 52.21969°N 0.75245°W

Chadstone
- Location within Northamptonshire
- OS grid reference: SP853586
- Unitary authority: West Northamptonshire
- Ceremonial county: Northamptonshire
- Region: East Midlands
- Country: England
- Sovereign state: United Kingdom
- Post town: Northampton
- Postcode district: NN7
- Dialling code: 01604
- Police: Northamptonshire
- Fire: Northamptonshire
- Ambulance: East Midlands
- UK Parliament: Northampton South

Chadstone is a hamlet in the civil parish of Castle Ashby, West Northamptonshire.
