= Skipsea =

Village and civil parish in the East Riding of Yorkshire, England

Coordinates: 53°58′40″N 0°13′12″W

- Location within the East Riding of Yorkshire
- Population: 693 (2011 census)
- OS grid reference: TA168550
- Civil parish: Skipsea
- Unitary authority: East Riding of Yorkshire
- Ceremonial county: East Riding of Yorkshire
- Region: Yorkshire and the Humber
- Country: England
- Sovereign state: United Kingdom
- Post town: DRIFFIELD
- Postcode district: YO25
- Dialling code: 01262
- Police: Humberside
- Fire: Humberside
- Ambulance: Yorkshire
- UK Parliament: Bridlington and The Wolds

Skipsea is a village and civil parish on the North Sea coast of the East Riding of Yorkshire, England. It is situated approximately 10 miles (16 km) south of Bridlington and 6 miles (9.7 km) north of Hornsea on the B1242 road at its junction with the B1249 road.

The civil parish is formed by the village of Skipsea and the hamlets of Skipsea Brough and Dringhoe. According to the 2011 UK census, Skipsea parish had a population of 693, an increase on the 2001 UK census figure of 633.

From the medieval era until the 19th century Skipsea was part of Dickering Wapentake. Between 1894 and 1974 Skipsea was a part of the Bridlington Rural District, in the East Riding of Yorkshire. Between 1974 and 1996 it was part of the Borough of North Wolds (later Borough of East Yorkshire), in the county of Humberside.

Just to the west of the village, in Skipsea Brough, lies Skipsea Castle. Built in 1086, the motte-and-bailey style castle has since been destroyed; however impressive earthworks remain. The coast near Skipsea, just over 0.6 miles (1 km) to the east, is the fastest eroding coastline in northern Europe.

== History ==
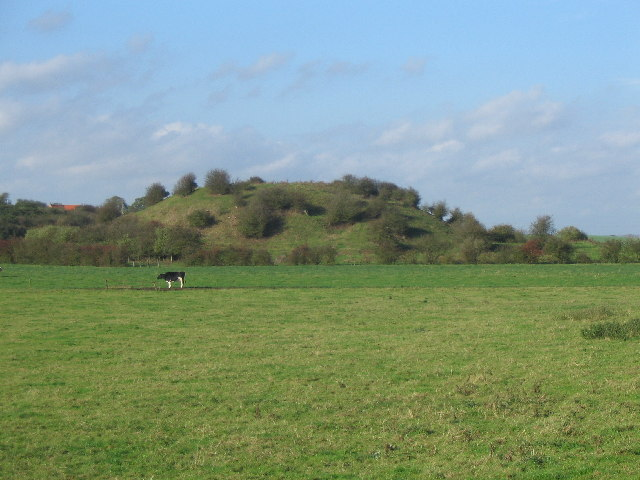
Motte of Skipsea Castle

The first recorded appearance of the name Skipsea is in the 12th century and the name is of Scandinavian origin, but the actual town-site has been in use much longer. This is of no real surprise, as this part of the English coast was frequented by Viking invaders before the Norman Conquest. There is some evidence that the name Skipsea refers to its original Viking meaning of "Ship Lake", but the closest literal meaning of Skipsea is "a lake navigable by ships". This name refers to the village's original location on the edge of a lake, which was suitable for navigation and eel-fishing, that was slightly inland from the sea. This land has since been lost because of erosion, making Skipsea a seaside Village. There is evidence of habitation dating back to the Stone and Bronze Ages because of the 19th century archaeological discovery of platforms, presumably for huts.

The borough of Skipsea Castle was first recorded between 1160 and 1175 and may have been founded by William le Gros, Count of Aumale, who died in 1179.

By the end of the 11th century, both Skipsea Castle and a church had been built, which encouraged the growth of a small town. In the following 13th and 14th centuries, local markets and fairs were granted "variously for Skipsea town, Skipsea manor, and Skipsea Brough manor, presumably all the same and possibly by then meaning Skipsea village".

The parish Church of All Saints was designated a Grade I listed building in 1966 and is now recorded in the National Heritage List for England, maintained by Historic England.

The village is also famous for being a possible site for nuclear testing in the 1950s, but the scientists at Aldermaston relented after strong opposition by the local community.

The Royal Observer Corps used Skipsea as a site for a Cold War observation post. The site was active from October 1959 until its decommissioning in September 1991. The site lay derelict until it was restored by an enthusiast in October 2008.

Currently, the economy of Skipsea is based on agriculture and tourism.

== See also ==
- Listed buildings in Skipsea
