= Fraisthorpe =

Village in the East Riding of Yorkshire, England

Coordinates: 54°02′21″N 0°14′24″W

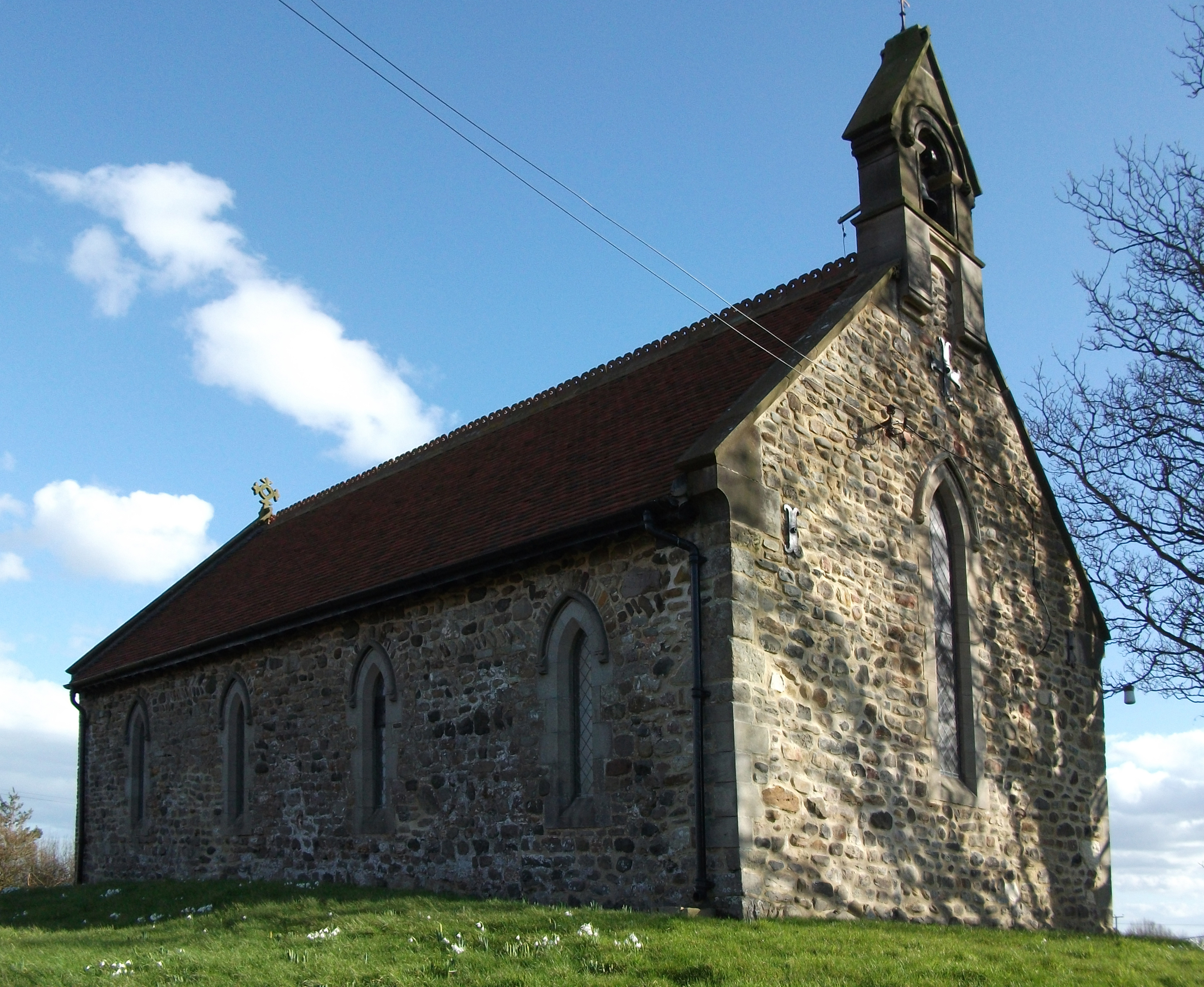
- St Edmund’s Chapel, Fraisthorpe

- Location within the East Riding of Yorkshire
- OS grid reference: TA153618
  - London: 175 mi (282 km) S
- Civil parish: Barmston
- Unitary authority: East Riding of Yorkshire
- Ceremonial county: East Riding of Yorkshire
- Region: Yorkshire and the Humber
- Country: England
- Sovereign state: United Kingdom
- Post town: BRIDLINGTON
- Postcode district: YO15
- Dialling code: 01262
- Police: Humberside
- Fire: Humberside
- Ambulance: Yorkshire
- UK Parliament: Bridlington and The Wolds

Fraisthorpe is a village and former civil parish, now in the parish of Barmston, in the East Riding of Yorkshire, England. It is situated approximately 4 miles (6 km) south of Bridlington town centre. It lies to the east of the A165 road.

Up to 2009, Fraisthorpe beach was used to hold a yearly Elim Pentecostal Church youth and family camp. In 1891 the parish had a population of 95.

Within Fraisthorpe is the Grade II listed Anglican chapel dedicated to St Edmund. Originally 13th century, it was remodelled in 1893 by Smith and Brodrick. The chancel and nave are unified, and constructed of rubble and cobble. Remaining from the 1893 rebuild are the 4-foot (1.2 m) high remains of a 13th-century pier in the south wall, which Pevsner asserted might be evidence of a former south aisle.

== History ==
The name Fraisthorpe derives from the Old Norse Freistingrsþorp or Freysteinnsþorp meaning 'Freistingr's' or 'Freysteinn's secondary settlement'.

In 1823 Fraisthorpe was written as "Fraysthorpe". It was in the parish of Carnaby and the Wapentake of Dickering. Occupations at the time included two farmers. In 1866 it became a separate parish, on 1 April 1896 the parish was abolished to form Fraisthorpe with Auburn and Wilsthorpe.

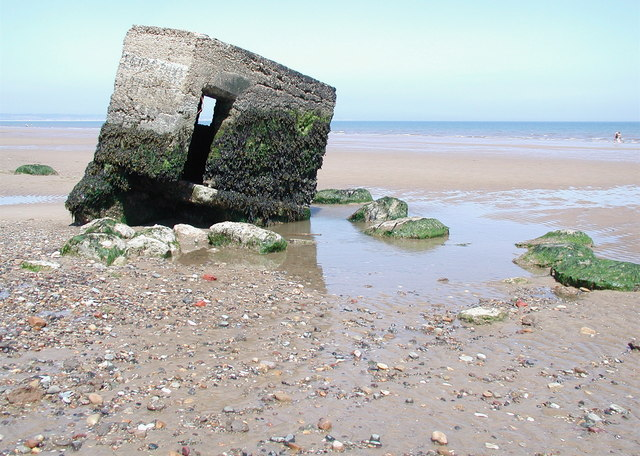
Fraisthorpe Sands

== See also ==
- Listed buildings in Barmston, East Riding of Yorkshire
- Fraisthorpe Wind Farm
