= All Saints' Church, Barmston =

Church in Barmston, East Riding of Yorkshire, England

Coordinates: 54.01291°N 0.23636°W

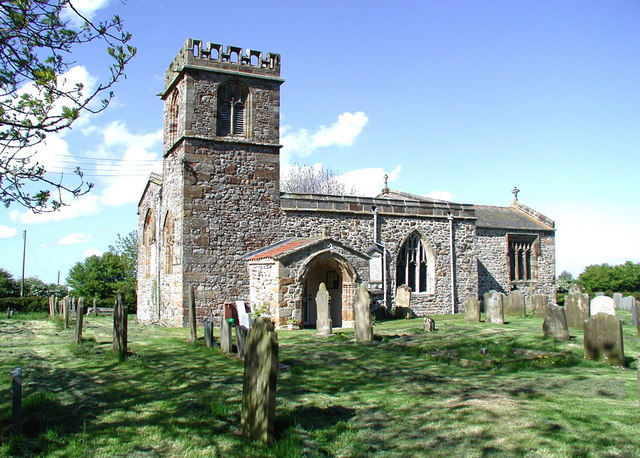
The church, in 2008

All Saints' Church is the parish church of Barmston, East Riding of Yorkshire, a village in England.

The church was built in the early 12th century, from which period the nave and chancel survive. In the 15th century, the tower, porch and south arcade were added, and some of the windows were altered around 1600. The church was repaired and covered in render around 1720, and was restored and the fittings replaced in 1874. The nave and aisle were re-roofed in 1938, and the church was grade I listed in 1966. By 2022, the church's congregation had fallen and it was considered for closure, following which villagers set up an attendance rota to ensure there would be attendees at services each week.

The church is built of cobble and stone with a Welsh slate roof, and consists of a nave, a south aisle, a south porch, a chancel and a west tower. The tower has two stages, a two-light Perpendicular west window with a moulded hood mould, a moulded stage band, two-light bell openings, and a pierced embattled parapet. Inside, there is a 12th-century tub font, and 19th-century sedilia and piscina. There is a hogback stone and part of a Saxon cross, and some fragments of Mediaeval stained glass in the south aisle windows. Monuments include a tomb with an alabaster knight, probably depicting William Moneaux, who died in 1446.

== See also ==
- Grade I listed buildings in the East Riding of Yorkshire
- Listed buildings in Barmston, East Riding of Yorkshire
