= Beeford =

Village and civil parish in the East Riding of Yorkshire, England

Coordinates: 53.971°N 0.281°W

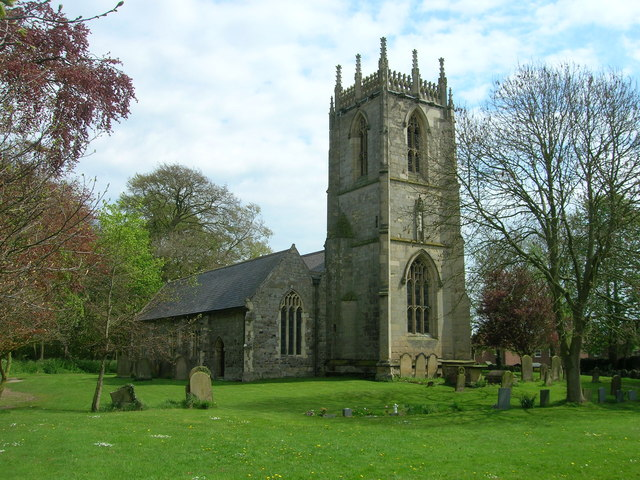
- St Leonard's Church, Beeford

- Location within the East Riding of Yorkshire
- Population: 1,078 (2011 census)
- OS grid reference: TA129542
  - London: 170 mi (270 km) S
- Civil parish: Beeford
- Unitary authority: East Riding of Yorkshire
- Ceremonial county: East Riding of Yorkshire
- Region: Yorkshire and the Humber
- Country: England
- Sovereign state: United Kingdom
- Post town: DRIFFIELD
- Postcode district: YO25
- Dialling code: 01262
- Police: Humberside
- Fire: Humberside
- Ambulance: Yorkshire
- UK Parliament: Bridlington and The Wolds

Beeford is a village and civil parish in the East Riding of Yorkshire, England. It is situated at the junction of the A165 and the B1249, and approximately 10 miles (16 km) north-east from Beverley and 8 miles (13 km) south from Bridlington.

According to the 2011 UK census, Beeford parish had a population of 1,078, an increase on the 2001 UK census figure of 955.

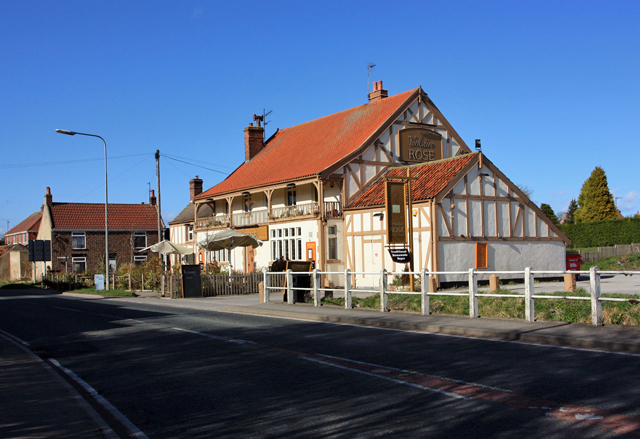
The Yorkshire Rose

The name Beeford probably derives from the Old English bīford meaning 'by the ford'. It perhaps could be derived from bēoford meaning 'bee ford'.

St Leonard's Church is a Grade II* listed building.

Beeford also has a Church of England primary school and playing fields.

== See also ==
- Listed buildings in Beeford
