= Barmston, East Riding of Yorkshire =

Village in the East Riding of Yorkshire, England

Barmston
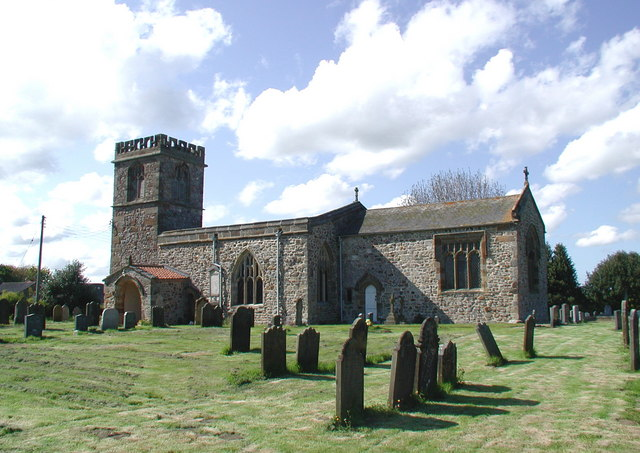
- All Saints church, Barmston

- Location within the East Riding of Yorkshire
- Population: 275 (2011 census)
- OS grid reference: TA163591
  - London: 170 mi (270 km) S
- Civil parish: Barmston
- Unitary authority: East Riding of Yorkshire
- Ceremonial county: East Riding of Yorkshire
- Region: Yorkshire and the Humber
- Country: England
- Sovereign state: United Kingdom
- Post town: DRIFFIELD
- Postcode district: YO25
- Dialling code: 01262
- Police: Humberside
- Fire: Humberside
- Ambulance: Yorkshire
- UK Parliament: Bridlington and The Wolds

Barmston is a village and civil parish in the East Riding of Yorkshire, England. It is situated on the Holderness coast, overlooking the North Sea and to the east of the A165 road. Barmston is approximately 6 miles (10 km) south of Bridlington town centre. The parish includes the village of Fraisthorpe, the former villages of Auburn and Hartburn have been abandoned due to coastal erosion. Barmston is mentioned in the Domesday Book as having eight ploughlands and belonging to Drogo of la Beuvrière. The name of the village derives from Beorn's Tūn (Beorn's Town). According to the 2011 UK census, Barmston and Fraisthorpe parish had a population of 275, a slight decrease on the 2001 UK census figure of 277. The parish covering an area of 1,765.014 hectares (4,361.44 acres).

The beach at Barmston was awarded the Blue flag rural beach award in 2005, but was removed from the list of designated bathing beaches in 2010, as a result of erosion making access to the beach difficult.

All Saints' Church, Barmston is a Grade I listed building. Barmston public house is the Black Bull. The Old Hall was designated a Grade II* listed building in 1952 and is now recorded in the National Heritage List for England, maintained by Historic England.

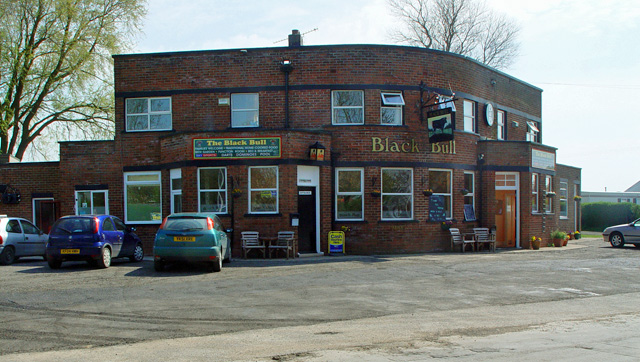
The Black Bull

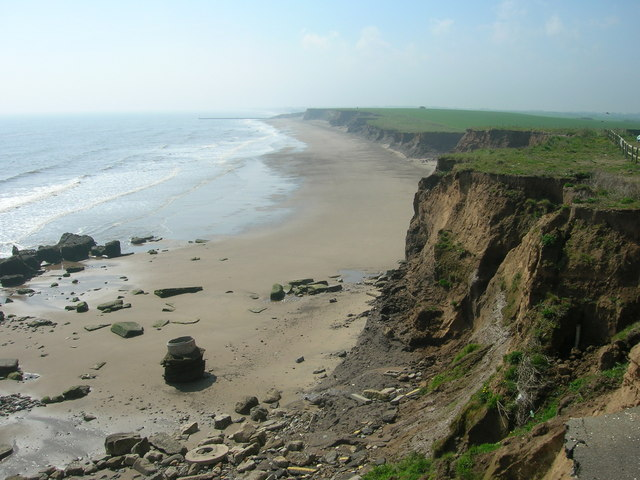
Barmston Sands

A key industry in the village is tourism and there is a caravan park located on former agricultural land near the beach. The cliffs are made of soft marl clay and are subject to erosion. Numerous properties have been demolished over the years to prevent them from falling into the sea. The position of a road leading down to the beach (long since lost to the sea) is clearly visible. The road still exists to the clifftop, which is blocked off by a barrier, and the rocks that supported the slope are still visible at low tide, giving an indication of how far the cliff has eroded. The coast road was completely lost to the sea by 1996. Barmston is one of the worst locations in England for coastal erosion; in 1967, 20 feet (6 m) of coastline was lost over just two days due to storms in October. The rate of erosion varies from year to year and is down to the tides and which way the winds are blowing, but typically the amount is between 4 feet (1.2 m) and 8 feet 2 inches (2.5 m) per year.

Barmston is the proposed landfall site for a carbon capture and storage scheme linking the proposed Don Valley Power Project at Stainforth, near Hatfield in South Yorkshire and the White Rose CCS project at Drax Power Station in North Yorkshire with porous rock beneath the North Sea.

== Geography ==
The civil parish is almost completely low lying agricultural land with several farmsteads; excluding the Holderness coast and the two villages of Barmston and Fraisthorpe. the high point is 85 feet (26 m) at Hamilton Hill, which is a triangulation point. (Note: 54.025547°N 0.225979°W Hamilton Hill) The A165 Bridlington Road passes through the parish.

== History ==
The village of Barmston gave its name to the ancient parish and ecclesiastical parishes of Barmston. The parish was bounded by watercourses of Earl's Dike (also known as Watermill Grounds Beck) to the north, and Barmston drain to the south. In 1935 the civil parish was substantially enlarged with the addition of most of the parish of Fraisthorpe to the north, an increase of 1,995 acres (807 ha). Although the current civil parish is called "Barmston" its parish council is called "Barmston and Fraisthorpe Parish Council".

The village of Hartburn on the Holderness coast was deserted after the 15th century and no longer exists due to coastal erosion. The village was located just south of the outflow of Earl's Dike on the coastline.

The hamlet of Winkton in the parish of Barmston had also been long abandoned by the 1850s.

The village of Auburn in the former parish of Fraisthorpe was abandoned to coastal erosion, except for a farm; (Note: 54.0456081°N 0.2181752°W Site of the medieval village of Auburn) the chapel was dismantled in the 1780s.

== Notable people ==
- William Dade, was vicar of the parish of Barmston between 1766 and 1790

== See also ==
- Listed buildings in Barmston, East Riding of Yorkshire
