= Skipsea Brough =

Hamlet in the East Riding of Yorkshire, England

Coordinates: 53.975219°N 0.229573°W

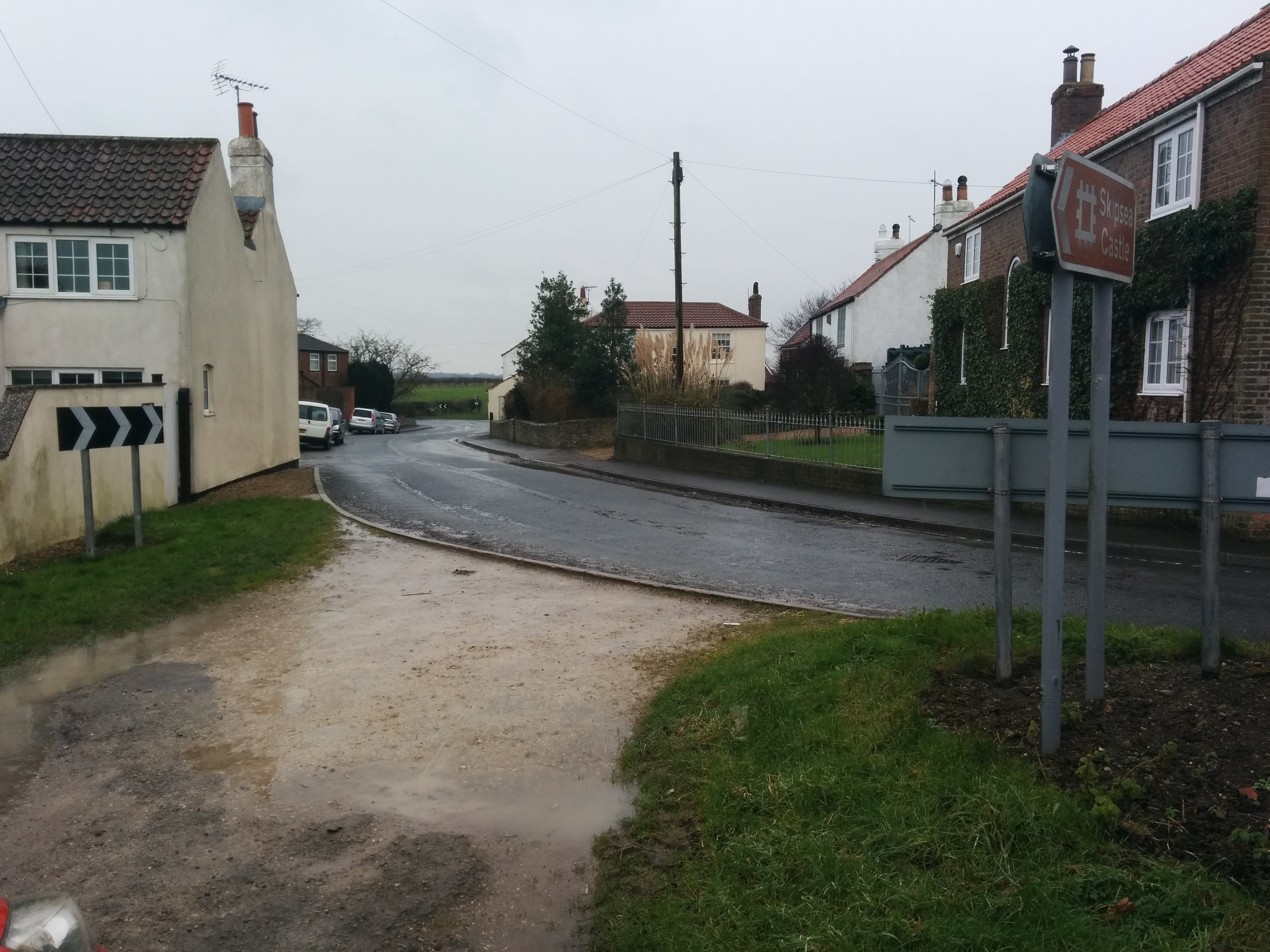

- Location within the East Riding of Yorkshire
- OS grid reference: TA162546
- Civil parish: Skipsea
- Unitary authority: East Riding of Yorkshire
- Ceremonial county: East Riding of Yorkshire
- Region: Yorkshire and the Humber
- Country: England
- Sovereign state: United Kingdom
- Post town: DRIFFIELD
- Postcode district: YO25
- Dialling code: 01262
- Police: Humberside
- Fire: Humberside
- Ambulance: Yorkshire
- UK Parliament: Bridlington and The Wolds

Skipsea Brough is a hamlet in the East Riding of Yorkshire, England. It is situated approximately 5 miles (8 km) north of Hornsea on the B1249 road.

It forms part of the civil parish of Skipsea.

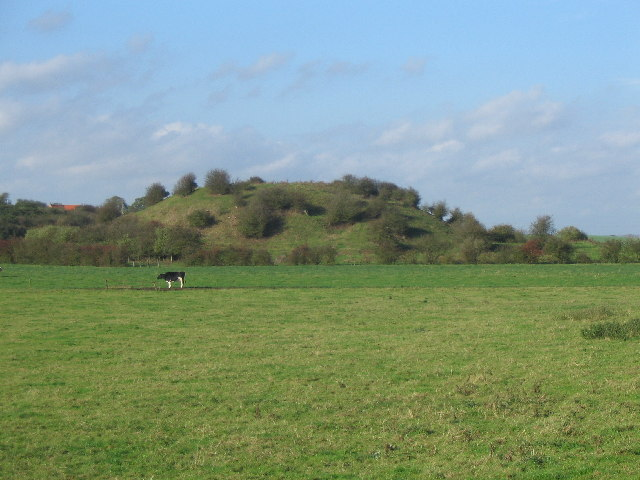
Motte of Skipsea Castle

Skipsea Brough is the location of Skipsea Castle which was built about 1086. The motte-and-bailey castle's buildings have since been destroyed, however, impressive earthworks still remain. In 2016 it was reported that the castle was itself built on top of a large Iron Age mound.
