= List of Quaker businesses, organizations and charities =

This is a list of notable businesses, organizations or charities founded by Quakers. Many of these are no longer managed or influenced by Quakers. At the end of the article are businesses that have never had any connection to Quakers, although some people may believe that they did or still do.

See separate List of Friends schools

== Businesses, organizations or charities with Quaker origins ==
=== A ===
- Albright and Wilson, manufacturing chemists
- Allen & Hanburys, founded in London in 1715 by Quaker Silvanus Bevan and his brother Timothy; grew to be a leading pharmaceutical company with operations in Argentina, Australia, Britain, Canada, China, India and South Africa before being acquired by Glaxo Laboratories in 1958
- Alternatives to Violence Project, volunteer-run conflict transformation program started in a New York prison in 1975
- American Friends Service Committee, Quaker peace and social justice organization founded in 1917
- Amnesty International, human rights organization; Eric Baker was a founding partner

=== B ===
- Barclays Bank, finance
- Bethlehem Steel, founded by Quaker entrepreneur Joseph Wharton
- Bewley's, Irish hot beverage company founded by Samuel and Charles Bewley. The Bewleys were one of Ireland's most well known Quaker families.
- Bradshaw's, Victorian and Edwardian publisher of the most widely used railway timetables in Britain, Europe and India, founded by Quaker George Bradshaw
- Bryant and May, former match manufacturing company, founded by two Quakers, Francis May and William Bryant

=== C ===
- Cadbury plc, chocolate and drinks manufacturer, founded by Quaker John Cadbury, and expanded by Quaker sons Richard and George
- Canadian Friends Historical Association, association of Quakers and historians who seek to preserve and communicate the ongoing history and faith of Friends (Quakers) in Canada and their contribution to the Canadian experience
- Carr's, UK biscuit manufacturer
- Clarks, shoe manufacturer
- Coalbrookdale Company, iron manufacturer
- Coast Medic, UK charity providing Paramedic emergency care at sea
- Couchiching Institute on Public Affairs, founded by Arthur Dorland

=== D ===
- Duane Morris, now one of the 100 largest law firms in the US, and still committed to Quaker values

=== E ===
- Earlham College, liberal arts college in Richmond, Indiana, founded in 1847 as the Friends Boarding School, a boarding high school for the religious education of Quaker adolescents

=== F ===
- Friends Provident, life insurance company, founded by Quakers Samuel Tuke and Joseph Rowntree
- Furness Withy, British Marine Transport company, founded as Withy and Co., iron and steel shipbuilders, of West Hartlepool by Quaker brothers Henry Withy (1852–1922) and Edward Withy (1844–1927); grew to own in excess of a thousand ships

=== G ===
- Gilkes Wilson and Company, British locomotive manufacturer
- Goodbody Stockbrokers, Irish Stockbrokers. Known for many years as "Goodbody & Webb", it was founded by two Quakers, Jonathan Goodbody and Richard Webb.
- Guilford College
- Greenpeace, campaigning environment organization; the four founding members include Irving Stowe and Dorothy Stowe of Vancouver Monthly Meeting.

=== H ===
- Huntley and Palmers biscuits, manufacturer in Reading, Berkshire
- Huntsman, steel manufacturer

=== I ===
- The Inman Line, Victorian passenger shipping line on the North Atlantic, founded in 1850 by Irish Quaker industrialist John Grubb Richardson and Englishman William Inman
- The International Voluntary Service was founded in 1931 by the Swiss Quaker Pierre Ceresole
- ICOPA, the International Conference on Penal Abolition, formerly the International Conference on Prison Abolition, founded by Ruth Morris

=== J ===
- Jacob's, Irish biscuit maker, best known for the cream cracker. Founded by William Beale Jacob and his brother Robert who were both Quakers.
- J. S. Fry & Sons, chocolate manufacturer
- John Fowler & Co., manufacturer of agricultural tools and machinery, founded by Quaker engineer and inventor John Fowler
- J H Holmes & Co (showing the entry for John Henry Holmes), electrical engineer, inventor and manufacturers in Newcastle upon Tyne specialising in early motors, dynamos & switches, and were pioneers of electric lighting on trains and the Suez canal
- Johns Hopkins University, renowned private university in Baltimore, Maryland, originally started as a graduate university by Quaker abolitionist Johns Hopkins, early board positions were partly filled by Friends
- Joseph Rowntree Charitable Trust

=== L ===
- Lloyds Bank, finance

=== M ===
- Merz & McLellan, British electrical engineering consultancy co-founded by Charles Hesterman Merz

=== N ===
- Neptune Bank Power Station, designed by Merz & McLellan, first power station in the United Kingdom to generate three-phase electric power, and the first to supply electricity for industrial purposes rather than just lighting
- Newcastle Electric Supply Company, founded by John Theodore Merz, pioneered the use of high-voltage three-phase AC power distribution in the United Kingdom

=== O ===
- Oxfam, charity

=== P ===
- PQ Corporation, or Philadelphia Quartz Company, was originally founded by Philadelphia Quaker businessmen, Joseph Elkinton and Thomas Elkinton.
- Priestman Brothers, Kingston upon Hull engineering company founded by Quaker William Dent Priestman and his brother Samuel Priestman, which built the earliest recorded railway locomotive powered by an internal combustion engine
- Penington Friends House, founded in 1897 to provide shelter and meals to Quakers and friendly people coming to New York City. Long term and short stay guest rooms are still provided.
- The Plymouth China Factory, founded by William Cookworthy, the first person in Britain to discover how to make hard-paste porcelain.

=== R ===
- Reckitt and Sons (now Reckitt), Kingston upon Hull household products manufacturer founded by Quaker Isaac Reckitt, and greatly expanded by his Quaker son Sir James Reckitt
- Renovaré, interfaith group founded by Richard J. Foster
- The Retreat, a pioneering mental health institution founded by William Tuke that practiced Moral treatment.
- Rogers Communications, Canadian media conglomerate
- Rogers Vacuum Tube Company, Canadian retailer and manufacturer of radio transmitters using alternating current vacuum tubes
- Rowntree's (owned by Nestlé), chocolate manufacturer, founded by Quaker Joseph Rowntree

=== S ===
- Sandy Spring Bank, founded in 1868 by Quaker farmers, now the largest bank in the state of Maryland, US
- Scott Bader Commonwealth, British manufacturer of advanced resins and composites, founded by Ernest Bader in 1951
- Sony (formerly Tokyo Tsushin Kogyo, or Tokyo Telecommunication Engineering, Co.), TTK's founding board president was Tamon Maeda, a Japanese Quaker, prewar Japanese ambassador to ILO, and postwar Minister of Education
- Stockton and Darlington Railway, established in 1825 by Quaker Edward Pease, operated the world's first permanent steam locomotive-hauled railway line
- Strawbridge and Clothier (now part of Macy's), department store chain, US (Pennsylvania, New Jersey, Delaware)

=== W ===
- Waterford Crystal, former producer of crystal glass, founded by Quakers in 1783, closed in 1851; the modern Waterford Wedgwood was not founded by Quakers, being the merger of a separate Waterford Crystal company founded in 1947 by non-Quaker Charles Bacik, and Wedgwood, founded by the Unitarian, Josiah Wedgwood.
- Western Union, founded by Ezra Cornell.
- Woodbrooke Quaker Study Centre, a Quaker educational institution in Selly Oak.

== Businesses with no Quaker connection ==
- Quaker Oats Company, food manufacturer
- Quaker State, motor oil brand
- Quaker Steak & Lube, casual dining restaurant chain based in Sharon, Pennsylvania
