= Listed buildings in Kingston upon Hull (Drypool Ward) =

Drypool Ward is a ward in the city and unitary authority of Kingston upon Hull, East Riding of Yorkshire, England. It contains 38 listed buildings that are recorded in the National Heritage List for England. All the listed buildings are designated at Grade II, the lowest of the three grades, which is applied to "buildings of national importance and special interest". The parish is to the east and northeast of the centre of the city, and is mainly residential, with some industry. It includes the model village of the Garden Village and many of the listed buildings are houses and other structures in the village. Elsewhere, the listed buildings include other houses, bridges, public houses, a crane, a former school, a former public library, groups of old people's houses, a silo, a war memorial, statues, a telephone kiosk, and a floor control barrier.

== Buildings ==
| Name and location | Photograph | Date | Notes |
|---|---|---|---|
| Holderness House; 53.75890°N 0.30803°W | | 1838 | A large house, later used for other purposes, in yellow brick on a plinth, with stone dressings, quoins, sill bands, string courses, low parapets, and slate roofs with coped gables, some shaped. There are two storeys, basements and attics, and fronts of five bays. On the entrance front is a square tower porch with four stages. Steps flanked by urns lead to an entrance with a round arch on three sides, one flanked by paired Doric pilasters. The doorway has a moulded surround and a cornice. Above are sash windows, some with pediments, and the top stage has a round window on each side. Most of the other windows are mullioned cross-casements, and there are through-eaves dormers. |
| Swing bridge, former Victoria Dock; 53.74251°N 0.31950°W | | 1849 | The swing bridge is in cast iron, with a wrought iron handrail and stone abutments. It is a two-leaf cantilever swing bridge with a road and railway tracks. There are two strutted sections that form a segmental arch when it is closed, and there are roller bearings at the pivot ends. Cast iron drums contain the gearing and the hand cranks which operate the bridge by engaging with a toothed sector. |
| Robbies' Public House; 53.74507°N 0.32260°W | | c. 1850 | A public house on an acute angled corner site, in colourwashed brick, with modillion wooden eaves, and a slate roof. There are two storeys and a front of five bays. Along the ground floor is an elaborate shopfront, with a plinth, a panelled stallboard, and panelled pilasters with scroll brackets and segmental pediments over the continuous moulded cornice. It contains three doorways with fanlights, two blocked, and windows with mullions and elliptical heads. On the upper floor are sash windows with flat brick heads. |
| Tubular crane 53.74422°N 0.32817°W | | c. 1865 | The tubular crane was moved to its present site near the former Trinity House Buoy Shed in 1901. It is built in wrought iron plates riveted together, and consists of a curved jib sunk into circular hole with a deep, straight counterweight secured to the base of the quayside. At the base are the original gearing cogs, cable drum and brake, and beneath is a small electric motor. The hoist cable is fed over the top of the jib on guiding wheels to the hook suspended from the apex. |
| Windmill Public House; 53.74828°N 0.32255°W | | c. 1870 | The public house, on a corner site, is in brick, with painted stone dressings, a wooden modillion cornice and a slate roof. There are three storeys and fronts of six and four bays and a rounded bay on the corner. The ground floor has a continuous shopfront in faience, with Ionic columns under a modillion cornice, and a frieze. There are four round-arched doorways, and above each is a scrolled pediment with a model of a windmill in relief. Between these are plate glass windows with toplights. The windows on the middle floor have segmental heads and keystones, and those on the top floor have flat heads and cornices on brackets. On the left return is a wall containing faience panels with festoons, false doorways with shell heads, and pilasters surmounted by ball finials. |
| River Hull Railway Bridge and operating cabin 53.76317°N 0.33388°W | | 1884 | A swing bridge carrying a railway over the River Hull, It consists of a riveted steel lattice trussed bowstring span with a central roller pivot, carried on round cast iron posts. At the north end is a pair of panelled brick pedestals with stepped caps. Beyond is the operating cabin in brick with stone dressings and a flat roof. It has a channelled rusticated basement with a cornice, and a round-arched doorway with a Gibbs surround and a multiple brick keystone. Above is a panelled stage with rusticated quoins and a round-headed window. |
| 365–371 Holderness Road; 53.75704°N 0.30889°W | | 1888 | A terrace of four houses in orange brick with a slate roof. There are two storeys and attics and six bays, and two-storey rear wings. The outer bays project and have gables , bargeboards with trefoil cut-outs, and applied timber framing in the apex. On the ground floor of each is a square bay window with a smaller canted bay window above, and in the gable is a segmental-headed sash window. Each adjacent bay contains a porch on decorative timber posts and two doorways with fanlights. The two central bays have canted bays windows, on the upper floor are sash windows, and there are two flat-roofed roof dormers. |
| Former primary school 53.74762°N 0.32585°W | | 1888 | Originally the Malton Street Board School, and later used for other purposes, it is in brick on a plinth, with stone dressings, a moulded sill band, and a slate roof with crowstepped gables and finials. There is a single storey and twelve bays. There are two large mullioned and transomed windows, and the smaller windows are casements with segmental heads and scroll keystones. To the left is a lower porch, and on the roof is a square wooden bell turret with pedimented openings and a square lead dome with a finial and a weathervane. |
| James Reckitt Library; 53.75023°N 0.31888°W | | 1888–89 | The former public library, designed by Alfred Gelder, is in red brick on a moulded stone plinth, with stone dressings, sill bands, an inscribed floor band, a moulded and bracketed eaves cornice, a parapet pierced by quatrefoils, and a slate roof. There are two storeys and seven bays, the middle bay projecting and rising as a three-storey tower with four truncated pinnacles. In the centre, steps lead to a pointed doorway with brick and stone voussoirs, and a hood mould, above which is a canted oriel window, and a three light cross-casement window. The ground floor windows have pointed arches, brick and stone voussoirs, floor and impost bands, and hood moulds, and the upper floor windows have flat heads and a continuous stepped hood mould. |
| Former Trinity House Buoy Shed; 53.74407°N 0.32809°W | | 1901 | The former buoy shed is in brick, with dressings in white, yellow and orange stone, and a roof of slate and corrugated sheet. It is a double-height rectangular shed, with a single-storey shed to the south. The building has a plinth, a sill band, a string course, a dentilled cornice, and a parapet with moulded coping. The five bays are separated by pilasters, with relief panels and pedestals above. The road front contains three infilled segmental arches with rusticated surrounds. On the river side is a tablet with a coat of arms. |
| Bridge over the former Foredyke Stream; 53.74839°N 0.32838°W | | 1902 | The bridge carries New Cleveland Street (A1165 road) over the Foredyke Stream, now infilled. It is in reinforced concrete, with terracotta parapets and brick flanking walls. The parapets are traceried and pierced, and the walls have moulded coping. Between the parapets and the walls are rectangular piers with cornices, containing relief panels and stepped granite caps, and one pier has an inscription. |
| 119–127 Witham; 53.74791°N 0.32828°W | | c. 1909 | Originally livery stables and later used for other purposes, the building is in red brick, with dressings in white brick, an eaves band, and a roof of Welsh slate with decorative terracotta ridge tiles. There are two storeys, attics in the centre, and 16 bays. In the centre is a two-bay pavilion with a square mansard roof. Its right bay contains a segmental-arched carriage entrance, to the left is a shopfront, on the upper floor are sash windows, and above are two dormers with shallow curved pediments. The outer bays have shopfronts on the ground floor, with fronts in wood and faience, and the upper floor contains blank panels divided by white brick pilaster strips. |
| 1 and 2 The Oval; 53.76158°N 0.31310°W | | 1907–08 | A pair of houses in colourwashed rendered brick, with deep eaves, curved metal gutter brackets, and hipped tile roofs. There are two storeys and four bays. The outer bays project under hipped roofs, and each contains a canted bay window and a three-light casement window on the upper floor. On the central bays are three-light windows and attic box dormers above. The returns have a central gabled bay containing a doorway with a flat hood on wooden brackets, and a two-light window above. |
| 3 and 4 The Oval; 53.76144°N 0.31284°W | | 1907–08 | A pair of houses in pebbledashed brick with a tile roof. There are two storeys and four bays. The middle bays project under gables with bargeboards and tile hanging. Each bay contains a three-light casement window on the ground floor and a canted oriel window above. The outer bays have a catslide roof, each with a box dormer. The left house has a doorway and a two-light window, and the right house has a porch with a doorway and a three-light window. |
| 5 and 6 The Oval; 53.76134°N 0.31258°W | | 1907 | A pair of houses in pebbledashed brick with a tile roof. There are two storeys and four bays. The outer bays project under hipped roofs, and each contains a canted bay window with a hipped roof, and above is a three-light casement window. On the outer parts of the middle bays are recessed doorways, between which are four-light windows, and above are four-light box dormers. |
| 7 and 8 The Oval; 53.76118°N 0.31226°W | | 1907 | A pair of houses in pebbledashed brick with a tile roof. There are two storeys and six bays. The outer bays project, they are gabled with bargeboards, and each contains a two-storey canted bay window. The adjacent bays contain a recessed doorway under a segmental arch, above is a balcony with a wooden railing, and between them are three-light casement windows. The returns have a central gabled bay containing a doorway with a flat hood on shaped wooden brackets. The right house has a small dated foundation stone. |
| 9 and 10 The Oval; 53.76097°N 0.31188°W | | 1907–08 | A pair of houses in brick, the upper floor pebbledashed, with a tile roof. There are two storeys and four bays. The middle bays each has a gable with a bargeboard, and contains a canted two-storey bay window. On the ground floor of each outer bay is a doorway, outside which is a square bay window, the left house also has a porch, and above each is a large gabled dormer. |
| 11 and 12 The Oval; 53.76068°N 0.31183°W | | 1907–08 | A pair of houses in pebbledashed brick with a tile roof. There are two storeys and four bays. The middle bays each has a gable with a bargeboard, and contains a two-storey canted bay window. The outer bays contain a round-arched doorway, outside which is a small two-light window. |
| 13 and 14 The Oval; 53.76042°N 0.31198°W | | 1907–08 | A pair of houses in colourwashed rendered brick with a tile roof. There are two storeys and four bays. The outer bays are gabled, with an inner catslide roof extending over a single-storey porch containing a round-arched doorway, and a round-headed window on the return. Each outer bay contains a two-storey canted bay window. Between them are three-light casement windows, the ground floor windows with transoms. On each return is a cross casement window above a small lean-to projection with two small windows. |
| 71 Village Road; 53.75922°N 0.31212°W | | 1908 | An estate office, later a private house, in brick, with applied timber framing and rendered infill, stone dressings and a tile roof. There are two storeys, an L-shaped plan, and fronts of two bays. On the right is a gabled wing, the upper floor jettied on brackets, with a four-light casement window, and below is a canted bay window. To the left is a small porch with a catslide roof, and a two-storey gabled stair turret with a mullioned cross window, and further to the left is a porch with a hipped roof, round-arched openings, and a doorway with an elliptical head. At the rear is a projecting gable with an oriel window on the upper floor, and a four-light mullioned window below. |
| 44 Elm Avenue; 53.75976°N 0.31220°W | | 1909 | The house is in pebbledashed brick, with a tile roof and tile hung gables. There are two storeys, a T-shaped plan and two bays. The cross-wing on the right has a canted bay window with a hipped roof, and a casement window above. The left bay has a catslide roof over a porch in the angle, and a segmental-headed doorway. Elsewhere, there are casement windows. |
| 15 and 16 The Oval; 53.76018°N 0.31178°W | | 1909 | A pair of houses in colourwashed rendered brick, with a tile roof and gables with bargeboards and tile hanging. There are two storeys and four bays. The middle bays project as gabled wings, and each contains a canted bay window on the ground floor, and an oriel window above. In each angle is a flat-roofer porch with a dentilled cornice on two wooden Tuscan columns with pedestals, and above is a single-light window. On each return is a projecting gable containing a transomed window, and an oriel window above. |
| 67 and 69 Village Road; 53.75910°N 0.31180°W | | c. 1909 | A pair of houses in colourwashed rendered brick, with quoins and a hipped tile roof. There are two storeys and attics, and eight bays. Each outer bay contains a two-storey canted bay window. The other bays contain doorways and a mix of sash and casement windows, and above are hipped roof dormers. |
| 77 and 79 Village Road; 53.75952°N 0.31220°W | | 1909 | A pair of houses in colourwashed rendered brick, with applied timber framing and rendered infill to the gables, and a tile roof. There are two storeys and four bays. The middle bays project under gables, and each contains a square oriel window on shaped brackets on the upper floor, and a canted bay window below. The outer bays have a corner porch with round-arched openings, and a two-light casement window, and above is a box roof dormer. |
| Former club house, Garden Village; 53.76086°N 0.31427°W | | 1909 | The building is stuccoed, with red brick and stone dressings, on a painted plinth, with deep modillion eaves and a tile roof. There is a single storey and a T-shaped plan, with a front of eleven bays. In the centre is a projecting gable containing a semicircular stone portico with two Roman Ionic columns and a cornice, and above it is a moulded eared inscribed tablet. Flanking the portico are windows with moulded surrounds. The outer bays contain windows with flat arches and keystones. On the left return is a semicircular bay window with a leaded half-dome, and above it is a cartouche with festoons. On the roof is a square domed cupola. |
| North Lodge; 53.75985°N 0.30835°W | | c. 1909 | Originally the entrance lodge to the Garden Village, and later a private house, it is in brick, with applied limber framing and rendered infill to the upper floor, and a tile roof. There are two storeys, three bays, and a cruciform plan. On the front is a double jettied gable on the left and a catslide roof on the right, with a doorway under the catslide roof. Most of the windows are casements. On the right return, facing the street, is a jettied gable above a canted bay window, and at the rear is another projecting gable. |
| Shopping centre, Garden Village; 53.75976°N 0.31391°W | | 1909 | The centre, which contains shops, a library and flats, is in stucco and brick, with dressings in red brick and stone, and tile roofs. There are two storeys and an E shaped plan, with a main range of 19 bays, and wings of eight bays. The central bay of the main range projects under a pedimented gable containing a cartouche and a festoon. It has a central round arch with imposts and three keystones, and contains a balustrade. On the roof is a square domed clock tower, and at the ends are gabled pavilions. Along the front are two doorways with pilasters, decorated fanlights and dentilled pediments, and sash windows. The windows above the doorways have eared architraves, and the others have flat brick arches and keystones. On the inner fronts of the blocks is a colonnade on Tuscan columns and a balustraded walkway. |
| 81 Village Road; 53.75958°N 0.31160°W | | 1910 | The house is in painted roughcast brick on an orange brick plinth, and has a tile roof. There are two storeys and an L-shaped plan, with a front of three bays. The left bay projects under a gable, and contains a two-storey canted bay window. In the angle is a porch containing two segmental arches with timber posts, and to the right of the doorway is a painted cast iron plaque inscribed with details of a previous resident, the inventor William Dent Priestman. Above is a three-light box roof dormer. On the right return is a two-storey canted bay window under a gable. |
| Juliet Reckitt Havens; 53.76403°N 0.31533°W | | 1911 | A group of eight old people's homes in an L-shaped plan with an angled corner. They have applied timber framing with rendered infill and a tile roof. There is a single storey and eight bays. The doorways have wooden surrounds with cambered bressumers, above the central doorway is a framed gable, and the windows are casements. |
| 1 and 3 Village Road; 53.75743°N 0.30865°W | | c. 1912 | A pair of houses in roughcast brick with a tile roof. There are two storeys and four bays. The middle bays project, they are gabled, and each contains a two-storey canted bay window. Each outer bay is narrower, and contains a round-arched doorway and a small two-light window above. On the returns are two-storey canted bay windows. |
| Frederick Reckitt Havens; 53.76047°N 0.30827°W | | 1912 | A group of old people's homes in three blocks of four houses each, on three sides of a courtyard. They have applied timber framing with rendered infill, and tile roofs. There is a single storey and each block has fronts of eight and two bays. The doorways are recessed under gables, and the windows are casements. |
| Isis Oil Mill Silo; 53.76420°N 0.32916°W | | 1912 | The silo for oilseed is in reinforced concrete, clad in brick, and with dressings in concrete and faience. It has a steel framed roof with a glazed clerestory and ventilators behind a parapet. It has a square plan, four stages and fronts of six bays, and full-height shallow buttresses. At the tops of the corner buttresses are pedimented niches and domes, and one corner has a square brick pedestal carrying a water tank. |
| Employees' war memorial fountain, Reckitt & Colman; 53.75393°N 0.32215°W | — | 1921 | The memorial commemorates the employees of the factory who were killed in the First World War. It is in the form of a fountain in stone, it stands in rectangular pool, and depicts a standing woman and a dying man on a square base. At the corners on the front is a pair of water spouts in the form of fish held by cherubs. It has a rectangular plinth with a water spout in the centre and a fish at each corner. |
| Statue of James Stuart; 53.75728°N 0.30847°W | | 1921 | The statue commemorates James Stuart, a local businessman, and is in Portland stone. It depicts a life-size standing figure in an oratorical pose, on a corniced square pedestal with enriched chamfered corners, and an inscribed tablet on the front. It has a square base with a cornice, and four diagonal buttresses with volutes. |
| James Reckitt Memorial, Reckitt & Colman; 53.75355°N 0.32201°W | — | 1926 | The memorial commemorates James Reckitt, and is in stone. It has a square pedestal with a chamfered plinth, a square base and leaf decoration at the top. On the front is a portrait medallion, and there is a half-size bronze figure of a seated woman and a child. The memorial is surrounded by a square paved area, and at each corner is a square block supported by volutes, surmounted by a small bronze figure of a child. |
| North Bridge; 53.74787°N 0.32998°W | | 1928–31 | The bridge carries George Street over the River Hull. It is a bascule bridge, the control cabins and machine rooms in reinforced concrete, spanning the road, with coped balustrades. In the centre is a semicircular arch with a large keystone extending upwards to a clock tower. The lifting span has a riveted steel lattice girder and cast-steel roller racks. The flanking footways have wrought iron lattice balustrades. Exposed pinions projecting from the machine rooms engage with straight racks to operate the bridge. |
| Telephone kiosk 53.75935°N 0.31389°W | | From 1968 | The telephone kiosk on Beech Avenue is of the K8 type designed by Bruce Martin. It is in cast iron with an aluminium door, It has a square plan and is painted cream. There is a flat domed roof, under which are rectangular panels with rounded corners containing "TELEPHONE". |
| Tidal surge barrier 53.74000°N 0.33072°W | | 1977–80 | The flood control barrier on the River Hull has reinforced concrete towers, a concrete sill, a steel gate and a barrier structure. There are two triangular towers on the banks of the river linked by a high level enclosed walkway, and the rectangular barrier gate is stored under the walkway. The operating machinery is in the tops of the towers. Adjacent to the west tower is a concrete generating building with a single storey and an L-shaped plan. |
