= Reckitt and Sons =

British household products manufacturer, 1840–1954

- Industry: Household products
- Predecessor: Isaac Reckitt and Sons
- Founded: 1840, registered 1879
- Founder: Isaac Reckitt
- Fate: Merged with Benckiser NV to make Reckitt Benckiser
- Successor: Reckitt & Colman
- Headquarters: Kingston upon Hull
- Products: Starch, black lead, household polish, laundry blue

Reckitt and Sons was a leading British manufacturer of household products, notably starch, black lead, laundry blue, and household polish, and based in Kingston upon Hull.

Isaac Reckitt began business in Hull in 1840, and his business became a private company "Isaac Reckitt and Sons" in 1879, and a public company in 1888. The company expanded through the late 19th and early 20th centuries. It merged with a major competitor in the starch market J. & J. Colman in 1938 to form Reckitt & Colman

Colmans' food business was subsequently divested and a merger made with Benckiser to form Reckitt Benckiser in 1999.

As of 2021 the company's original site at Dansom Lane, Hull, is still used for manufacturing.

== History ==
=== Origins ===
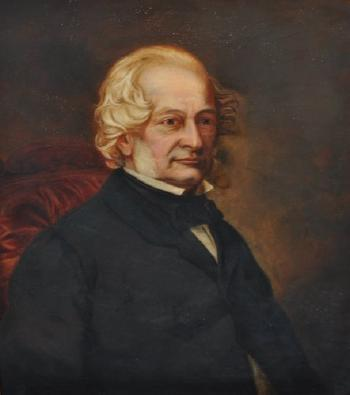
Isaac Reckitt, by M.A.H. Willson

In 1818 Isaac Reckitt and his brother Thomas established a milling business in Boston, Lincolnshire with capital of £1,300 (equivalent to £100,000 in 2025), building Maud Foster Mill (1819), and later expanding their business into cement manufacture (1823) and bone milling (1828). Isaac quit the partnership in 1833 establishing himself as a corn factor in Nottingham; this business failed and in 1840 he moved to Kingston upon Hull, and rented the starch works (b.1835) of Charles Middleton, in Dansom Lane.

The business made soluble starch from both farina and sago; by 1847 the business was profitable generating an excess of £1,000 (equivalent to £90,000 in 2025). In the late 1840s the business began promoting itself through extensive use of advertising, though initial positive effects were limited. In the 1850s the business began manufacturing laundry blue using ultramarine, and then black lead; the two products together with starch, plus their derivatives became the mainstay of the business. In 1857 the company began manufacturing biscuits. The developments of the 1850s led to extension of the works at Dansom Lane, and a new biscuit factory was built 1861, and a rice starch plant in 1864.

Isaac Reckitt died on 7 March 1862, and three of his sons George, Francis and James, became partners in the firm. The biscuit factory burnt down in 1866, and the activity was not restarted; the goodwill of the company was sold to Peak, Frean and Co. T.R. Ferens joined the company in 1868 as a shorthand clerk. (Note: T.R. Ferens joined the company in 1868, and became a director on the board when the company became public in 1888. Reckitt (1951, pp. 34, 47) He is considered to have been key character in the development of the company in the 20th century. Church & Clark (2004, p. 28)) The company, then known as Isaac Reckitt and Sons became a private joint stock company, with capital of £150,000 in 1879, as Reckitt and Sons Ltd.

=== Reckitt and Sons Ltd. (1879–1954) ===
In 1882 the company built a factory for the manufacture of synthetic Ultramarine in Morley Street, Stoneferry, and expertise in its manufacture was brought in from Germany, manufacturing began in 1884, at 150 tons, increasing to 500 tons by 1891.

In 1888 the business was converted into a public company, with its capital increased to £450,000. Subsequently, the factory was expanded substantially around the Dansom Lane site, the works in Stoneferry were also expanded, increasing production of Ultramarine to 650 tons pa, and adding mills for graphite. In 1894 James Reckitt accepted a Baronetcy, in part for his services to the local Liberal Party.

New brands in the 1890 included "Robin Starch" an improved starch with a borax lubricant derived from a product produced by Heinrich Mack of Ulm; and "Zebra" black lead. The dominance of the British Empire in the early 1900s also benefited the company's export business, the company increased its overseas business, first in Australia, later other countries of the British Empire, and in the 1900s into South America and the USA, as well as Europe. The company's corporate welfare towards its employees was also active from the 1890s onwards: a non-contributory pension fund was started, and in 1908 the model workers housing estate, the Garden Village opened; the company also organised evening classes, other social activities.

Scientific laboratory work and the employment of qualified chemists began in the late 1890s. At the start this work was purely directed towards quality control and the testing of raw materials; research was subsequently carried out into new products and the improvement of production efficiency.

In the pre-First World War years of the 20th century the company expanded by acquisition, as well as by organic growth. The Brasso metal polish product was introduced in 1905, and an additional factory established on Dansom Lane for its manufacture; rival polishes-Bluebell, Shinio and Mepo were acquired in the early 1900s, along with a number of stove, boot and metal polish brands, and blue manufacturers. The company's first Irish branch was started in Edmondstown in 1910, and the Chiswick Polish Company was founded in 1913 as a joint venture. (Note: Founded 1913 as a joint venture with Mason Brothers, manufacturers of "Cherry Blossom" boot polish. Included the acquired firms of William Berry Ltd., and Master Boot Polish Co. of West Bromwich, both acquired in 1912. The boot polish activities of Martindales (acq.1917) was also merged. Chiswick merged with Nugget Polish Co. in 1929 forming Chiswick Products Ltd. The formation of Chiswick Products was later used as the model for the Reckitt and Colman merger.) The company expanded by acquiring related manufacturing and raw material concerns, cutting costs: Wilson's Canister Works in Stoneferry was acquired, and carbon black manufacturers were acquired. The acquisitions increased Reckitt's employees from 3,025 in 1909 to 5,339 in 1913.

During the First World War, as the proprietors were Quakers, the company produced non-combative equipment, including petrol tins. Additionally, a number of German owned concerns were bought from the Custodian of Enemy Property; the company also expanded its Ultramarine production, as much of the demand for the product had previously been settled by German firms. Reckitt's social club hall was used as a Voluntary Aid Detachment hospital.

In the 1920s the Zebo liquid grate polish, Windo (later Windolene) window cleaner, Karpol car body wash and Reckitt's Bath Cubes brands were launched. The black lead works of competitor Hargreaves in Gipsyville, Hull was acquired in 1922 and closed after that company became insolvent. In 1926 the major acquisition of the Belgian ultramarine manufacturer S.A. des Usines Destrée was made, which included factories in Haren, Melle and Comines. (Note: Other 1920/30s acquisitions included the Lancashire Ultramarine Company of Backbarrow; the British Ultramarine Co.; Rawlins (Smalts) Ltd.; The Glossit Co. producers of Eze metal polish; the Suffolk Chemical Company; and Black-it Black Varnish.Reckitt (1951, pp. 75–76)) Together with Colman's, the company acquired French's, the American mustard manufacturer, in 1926 for £750,000. Overseas acquisitions in the 1920s and 1930s were partly in response to the protectionist environment of that period.

In 1929, a former scientist at Jeyes joined the firm, and developed the Dettol disinfectant. The product was launched c. 1932. In 1932 the Harpic lavatory cleaner business was also acquired.

Discussions relating to an amalgamation with J. & J. Colman had begun in 1909, and continued with over the next decades, with asset swaps or a complete merger discussed in 1919; worldwide pooling arrangements had been made in 1930; in 1937 agreement was reached on an amalgamation. Reckitt and Colman was formed in 1938 with Sir Philip Reckitt as chairman, and Sir Jeremiah Colman as vice-chairman.

The merged companies retained separate listings on the London Stock Exchange until 1954, when a full merger took place, forming Reckitt & Colman Holdings Ltd.; the 'Chiswick' shoe polish joint venture business was absorbed in the same year.

== See also ==
- Reckitt baronets
- Reckitt
