= John Bellows =

English printer, lexicographer and archaeologist

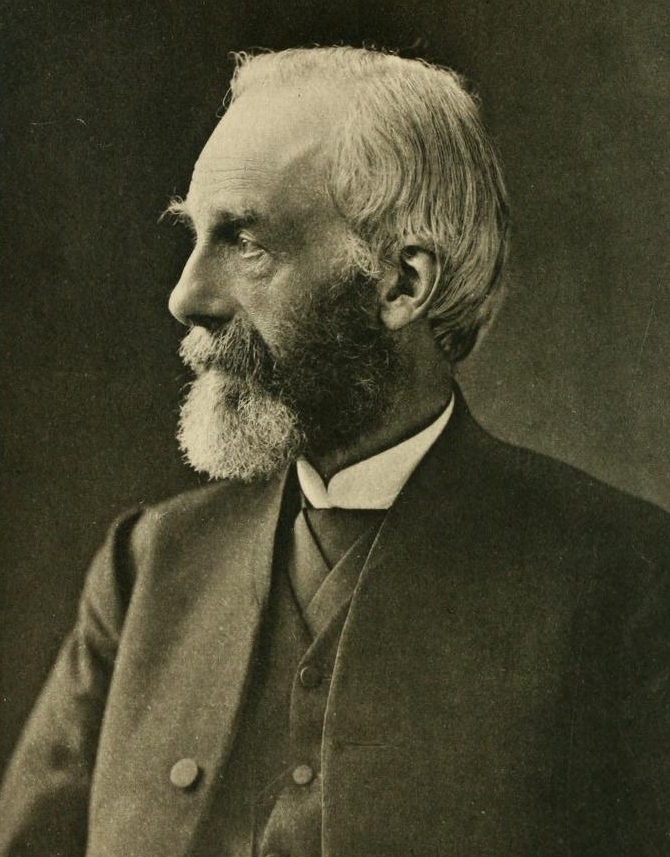
- Born: John Thomas Bellows; 18 January 1831; Liskeard, Cornwall, England
- Died: 5 May 1902 (aged 71); Gloucester, England
- Occupations: Lexicographer; Printer
- Spouse: Elizabeth Earnshaw (1842-1932)
- Children: Max, Marian, William, Hannah, Emily (who died young), Philip, Katherine (Kitty), Lucy, John Earnshaw, Dorothy
- Parent(s): William Lamb Bellows (1802-1877), Hannah Stricland/Bellows

John Thomas Bellows (18 January 1831 – 5 May 1902) was an English polymath, printer and lexicographer from Cornwall.

A prominent member of the informal but influential network of Quaker businessmen-philanthropists that was a feature of Victorian England, he established the Gloucester printing firm, "John Bellows" which, under his son and remoter descendants, would remain an important part of the Gloucester commercial scene till 1967. He wrote prolifically.

== Life ==
=== Early years ===
John Bellows was born in Liskeard, a small but regionally important market town in Cornwall. The hitherto Methodist family joined the Quakers in 1838, and in 1841 John's energetic father, William Lamb Bellows, established a school at Camborne, on the other side of the county: this necessitated relocation. Their father was an erudite man, a biblical scholar fluent in Hebrew and "passionately interested in nature". John Bellows and his younger brother Ebenezer received much of their education from their father, both as pupils at the school and on the long country walks which they took together.

=== The printer ===
In 1845 John Bellows became an apprentice with Llewellyn Newton, a Camborne printer. Newton also kept a library: John Bellows was frequently sent on long errands, and perfected the art of reading while walking, books which his employer was happy to loan him. Bellows became a voracious reader. On completion of the apprenticeship he took a job with Harrison's, a London printing business described as the "Queen's Printers", but he became ill in London and after six months had to return to Cornwall to recuperate. In 1851 he took a job in Gloucester with a small printing business, located in the lower part of Gloucester. He was stranded for several days in the printing works by the serious flooding that affected Gloucester in 1852, later recalling inventive ways of passing bread on the end of an improvised delivery system involving a long handled broom through the upstairs window of the printing works in which he was stranded, and across to the upstairs window of a neighbouring property where the occupiers had run out of food. It was also during the 1850s in Gloucester that he began to take a more thoughtful approach view to his inherited Quaker beliefs. This led him to give up smoking, recognising that "if he would save his soul he must no longer be the slave of any habit".

=== The entrepreneur-scholar ===
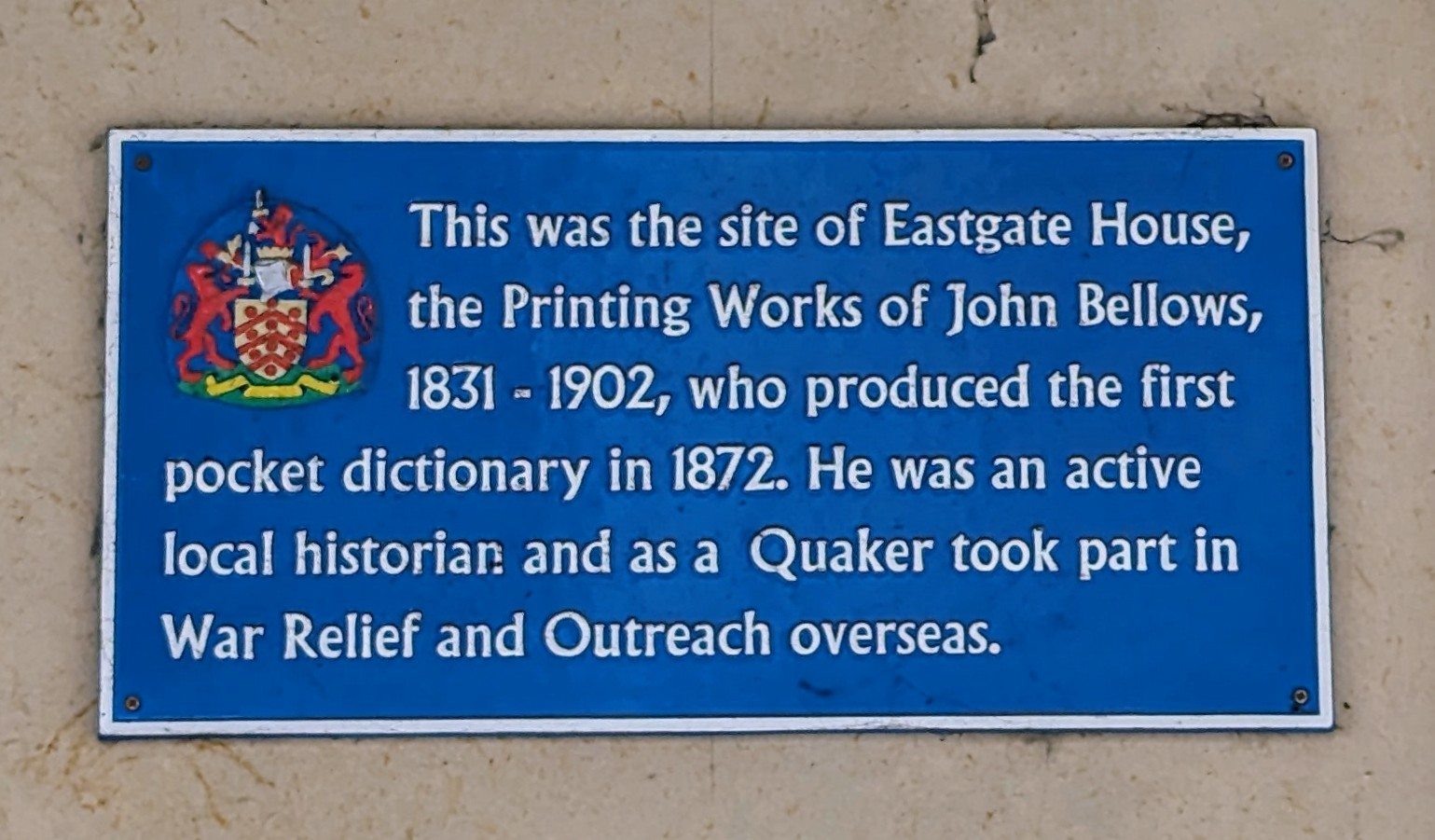
Plaque marking Eastgate House site.

In 1858 his employer disposed of his printing business, and after some prevarication John Bellows established his own printing firm on higher ground, along "Commercial Road", in Gloucester, investing heavily in modern machinery and equipment. Meanwhile, also in 1858, his father retired from the school he had founded and relocated to Gloucester where father and mother lived with their eldest son in rooms above the son's newly established printing business. Success encouraged expansion, and further relocations within the city followed when the business moved to "Westgate Street" in 1863, and then, again, in 1873 to Eastgate House on "Eastgate Street", where it continued to operate until 1967.

Bellows had evidently inherited his father's intellectual energy, developing a particular interest in Philology; and as his business thrived during the 1860s he entered into scholarly correspondences with contemporary intellectuals including the philologist Max Müller, after whom Bellows would later name his eldest son, Max. Another correspondent was the fellow polymath Oliver Wendell Holmes: the exchanges with Wendell Holmes would continue for twenty-five years. Bellows also found time to master French: another of his correspondents was the late emperor's philologist nephew, Lucien Bonaparte.

=== The traveler: market opportunities for a lexicographer ===
John Bellows was a keen traveler. His younger brother Ebenezer had settled in Brussels in 1861 and John visited his brother frequently by the standards of the times. In 1863, while distributing bibles at the docks in Gloucester, he met the daughter of a Norwegian ship's captain to whom he later became engaged: unfortunately his fiancée died before they could be married. On one of his hasty trips abroad he became acutely aware of a gap in the market for dictionaries small enough to be portable by travelers. His original idea was for portable dictionary involving Norwegian, but he quickly came to the realisation that market demand for such a lexicon would be very small. He persisted, however, and succeeded in obtaining a substantial quantity of high strength light-weight paper from a Scots firm that had intended to supply bank notes to the Confederate side in the American Civil War. The effectiveness with which Charleston was blockaded by the northern navy made it impossible to deliver bank notes, however, leaving the Glasgow firm with more high grade paper than they could use.

John Bellows on pacifism

"I candidly admit I don't know how to answer thy question: What would I do if my wife and child lived in Saarbrück and the French were to come and bombard the town? I run, mentally, in a moment, over the line of argument that suggests itself, and find myself at the other end of that line — bombarding the French. But, what French? Those who came to Saarbrück, or others who had nothing to do with that? People call war justice on a large scale; but the mischief is that it is only the vastness of the scale that prevents our seeing there is no justice about it.

What, for example, is the justice of killing a child in Strasburg who never heard of Saarbrück? I should look back all my life with regret upon such an act, if I had been led to its commission. The only way for us to get a really just view of such cases is to bring them home to ourselves, and I do so, thus: My house is attacked by a ruffian who would make 'no bones' of killing my wife and child if he could. I beat him off. He runs away to his own house and bars himself in. I say I will stop this man from repeating his attacks on me; I'll burn his place down. So I set fire to the place. He himself may or may not be injured: I care nothing about that; but he has a little child as innocent as my own, and I see the little thing lying in torment from a stone falling on it in consequence of my work. I should go back home with a feeling that would never leave me day nor night, that if there really is a Father of all, to whom all men on earth are alike dear— barring their wilful acts — He would look down on me as guilty of a very cruel deed; and no plea that I could bring that I had done it to protect my own wife and child, would alter it. I don't find fault with the individual Germans for their conduct — very far from it. I should abhor myself were I to endeavour to stir up any bitter feeling against these poor fellows, for I have a sympathy with their fate that very often when I am alone finds vent in tears. They are brave as men of steel; but no one who does not actually come into contact with them can tell how great is the suffering entailed upon them by having to leave their homes behind, too often never to return. Where a young man does this, he has much to act as a counterbalance — the excitement, the novelty, the hope of returning as a hero. With a man of middle, or more than middle life, it is far otherwise. The intense sorrow I have seen stamped on the faces of some of these I shall never forget. It haunts me, and makes it impossible for me to look on the war from any political point whatever.

That some good may arise out of such oceans of suffering and evil, can hardly be doubted; but, whatever it may be, it is dearly bought — too dearly bought at the price of so many thousands of homes plunged into grief, so many millions of tears that will flow on for years in every corner of Germany and of France.

... from a letter dated 21 February [1871] addressed to Professor Max Muller in Oxford

With extensive contributions from Max Müller, Bellows himself compiled several light-weight dictionaries during the second half of the 1860s which he then published:

- Outline Dictionary for Missionaries, Explorers, and Students of Language (1867)
- English Outline Vocabulary of Chinese, Japanese and other Languages (1868)
- Tous les Verbes, French and English (1869)

In November 1870 he traveled to the Metz region, distributing Quaker relief aid to surviving civilian victims of the recent Franco-Prussian War. The objectives of the mission, which received "every possible assistance from the [occupying] German authorities", were eloquently set out in a document which each member of the relief mission carried, its text set out in the English, German and French languages: disease was rife, and on the final day of his Metz stay he was attending the funeral of a fellow relief worker who had succumbed to small pox.

By 1870 it is clear that Bellows was also planning for a further dictionary project on a much more ambitious scale, having spent the previous five or so years learning the French language from scratch. The weeks spent in Lorraine seem to have pushed work on the project for a "pocket ‘French-English Dictionary’" further up his agenda, and he may have taken the opportunity of this visit to France to invoke further practical input from friends with mother-tongue French. Bellows' pocket French dictionary, when it appeared in 1872 or 1873, was dedicated to Lucien Bonaparte who had himself contributed much to its preparation. Printed on high-quality thin paper, it measured 3 x 5 inches and incorporated 340,000 French and English words. 6,000 copies of this first edition were printed and, remarkably, the entire print-run was sold out within a year. An enhanced edition appeared in 1876. Some years after John Bellow himself had died his business, now controlled by his son William, was able, with help from a new generation of francophone friends, to produce an updated and expanded edition in 1911.

=== The polymath ===
A further focus for his studies was Archaeology. He took a particular interest in the archaeological expeditions to Palestine which were frequently in the headlines in the 1870s. Closer to home he ordered a bulky new steam press which required an expansion of his new premises at Eastgate House. During excavations for the extension foundations, in 1872/73, he was involved in the discovery, between "Dog Lane" and "King Street", of a large section of Gloucester's Roman city walls, a matter on which in due course he wrote up and published his discoveries for the "Bristol and Gloucester Archaeological Society". Bellows was elected a member of the American Antiquarian Society in 1892.

John Bellows retained the travel habit throughout his life. While the printing business continued to thrive, between 1873 and his death in 1902 he joined a succession of small teams of co-religionists, visiting France, Russia, Bulgaria, Turkey, Canada and the United States of America. The stated purpose of these visits was to promote the religion and work of the Religious Society of Friends (as the Quakers were more formally known). He was able to meet Oliver Wendell Holmes, with whom till now his friendship had been conducted only through correspondence, and on two visits to Russia, to strike up a lasting friendship with Leo Tolstoy, with whom Bellows remained in contact till he died. His final overseas trip took place in 1901, and involved a return to New England. In June of that year he was able to receive in person an honorary MA degree from Harvard University.

== Personal ==
John Bellows' brother had returned to England and married in 1863. In January 1869 John Bellows himself married Elizabeth Earnshaw from Clitheroe in Lancashire. Elizabeth's father was a surgeon. He met her through his friend, her brother, Hugh Granger Earnshaw, who was employed as a factory inspector in the Gloucester area. The marriage produced ten recorded children.

John Bellows became increasingly devout as his life progressed. In addition to giving up smoking and engaging in regular mostly low-profile acts of philanthropy, both in and Gloucester and further afield. His commitment to pacifism was profound. He became teetotal and was even, from 1890, a vegetarian. A painting of Bellows by Percy Bigland can be seen at the Museum of Gloucester.
