= Garden Village, Kingston upon Hull =

Area of Kingston upon Hull, England

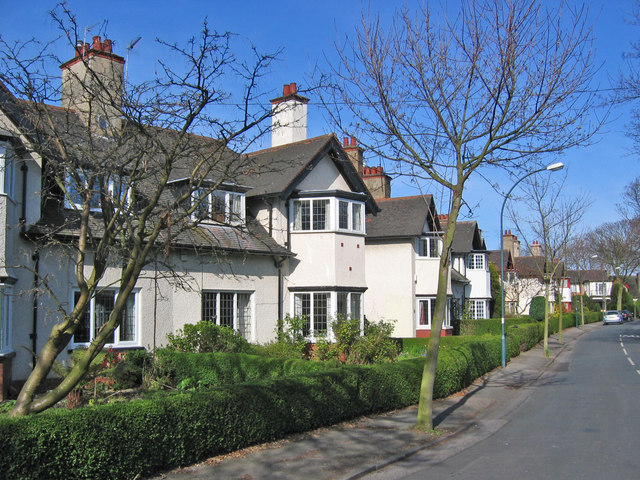
Maple Grove, Garden Village

Garden Village is an area of model village housing built in the early 1900s, in the Summergangs area of Kingston upon Hull, England, for the workers of Reckitt & Sons.

== History and description ==
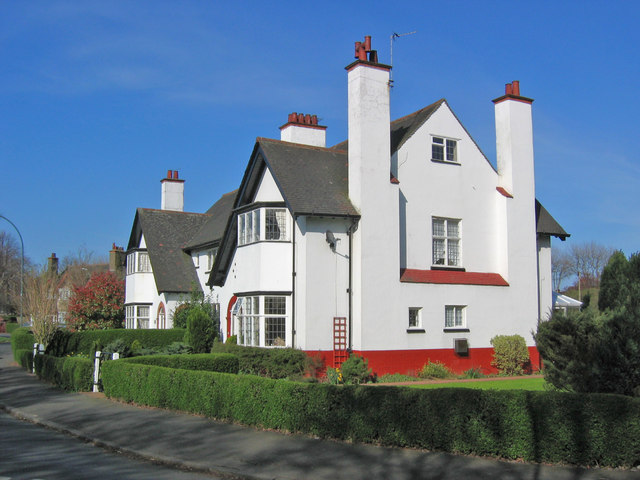
The Oval, Garden Village

The village was built on 140 acres (57 ha) of land by the 'Hull Garden Village Co.', a company with £200,000 of capital of which two-thirds was contributed by Sir James Reckitt, and with two-thirds of the housing reserved for his workers. The company's dividends were limited to 3%.

The estate opened in 1908, its design was influenced by the ideas of the Garden city movement. The design was by architects Percy Runton and William Barry. By 1913, 600 houses had been built in five sizes and with twelve different styles, generally with a short front garden and long back garden, often accessed by a 'ten-foot' alley, a low housing density, built of brick often pebble dashed, (some houses received a white Medusa Portland cement render) with steeply pitched roofs with overhanging eaves, recessed doorways and wood framed windows, privet hedges, and avenued tree planting generalising the design. A second phase of development began in 1923. Houses were built at a density of 12 per acre; 1 acre (0.0040 km^{2}), with streets named after trees and shrubs.

Facilities included a shopping centre, club house, a hostel for female workers, as well as several almshouses, several of which are listed buildings. A substantial number of the ordinary housing stock are now also listed buildings.

During the Hull Blitz the area was badly damaged by bombing, possibly due to its proximity to Reckitt & Sons' Dansom Lane works.

In 1950 the Garden Village company was disbanded; some houses were sold to tenants, the entire estate was bought by the Bradford Property Trust, the open spaces known as 'The Oval' and 'The Playground' were transferred to the Hull City Council for a nominal fee. The area became a designated conservation area in 1970.

=== Church of St Columba ===
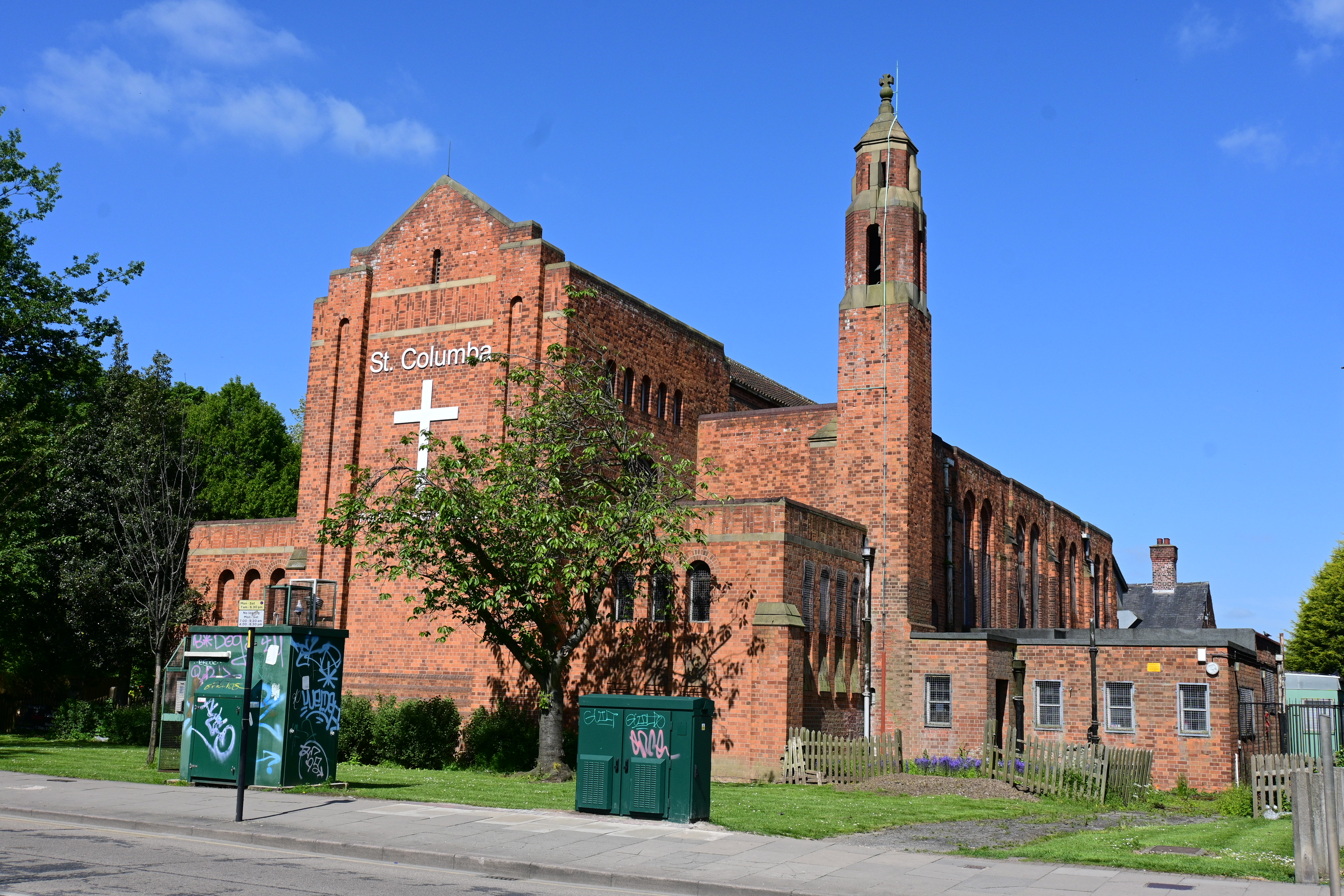
St Columba's Church, Parish of Drypool

A temporary church dedicated to St Columba had been built in 1914, on Laburnum Avenue also by the architects Runton and Barry, (Note: 53.759168°N 0.306283°W Laburnum Avenue, Holderness Road, site of a succession of churches) a permanent building was constructed and opened in 1929, but was destroyed during the Second World War by bombing. A replacement was constructed using some elements of the old structure. The new church became the parish church for the ecclesiastical parish of Drypool in 1961.

== See also ==
- List of areas in Kingston upon Hull
- Listed buildings in Kingston upon Hull (Drypool Ward)
