= Maud Foster Windmill =

Grade I listed windmill in Lincolnshire, England

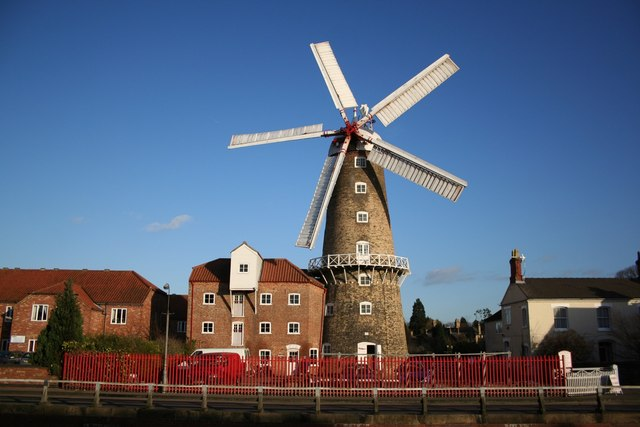
- Maud Foster Mill, January 2008
- Interactive map of Maud Foster Windmill

Origin
- Mill location: Boston, Lincolnshire
- Coordinates: 52°59′01″N 0°01′04″W
- Operator: James Waterfield
- Year built: 1819

Information
- Purpose: Corn mill
- Type: Tower mill
- Storeys: Seven storey
- No. of sails: Five
- Type of sails: Patent sails
- Windshaft: Cast iron
- Winding: Fantail
- Fantail blades: Eight blades
- No. of pairs of millstones: Three pairs

Maud Foster Windmill is a seven-storey, five sail windmill located by the Maud Foster Drain in Skirbeck, Boston, Lincolnshire, England, from which she is named. She is one of the largest operating windmills in England being 80 feet (24.38 m) tall to the cap ball.

The tower mill and adjoining granary is grade I listed building. The mill was built in 1819 for Isaac and Thomas Reckitt of Wainfleet. It was repaired and restored in 1988.

== History ==
The tower mill was erected on Willoughby Road on the east side of John Rennie's Maud Foster Drain for Thomas and Isaac Reckitt by the Hull millwrights Norman and Smithson in 1819. Corn for the mill was brought in by barge along the drain. The original drawings and accounts survive, telling us that it cost £1826-10s-6d. The Reckitt brothers were millers, corn factors and bakers until poor harvests in the years up to 1833 led to the mill being sold. Isaac Reckitt moved to Nottingham and then to Hull where he set up Reckitt & Sons.

The Ostler family bought the mill in 1914 and ran the business, known as Ostler's Mill, until 1948 when it closed and the mill fell into disrepair. In 1953 Isaac Reckitt's great grandson, Basil arranged for two Reckitt family charitable trusts to finance essential repairs by Thompsons of Alford and, in the same year, the mill was listed as being of exceptional interest.

In 1987 the mill was bought by James Waterfield and his family who restored her in 1988 to fully working order being now the most productive windmill in all England. The mill is open to visitors who may climb all seven floors and see the milling process in action and enjoy views of the town from the balcony. The mill shop sells flour and porridge.

== Structure ==
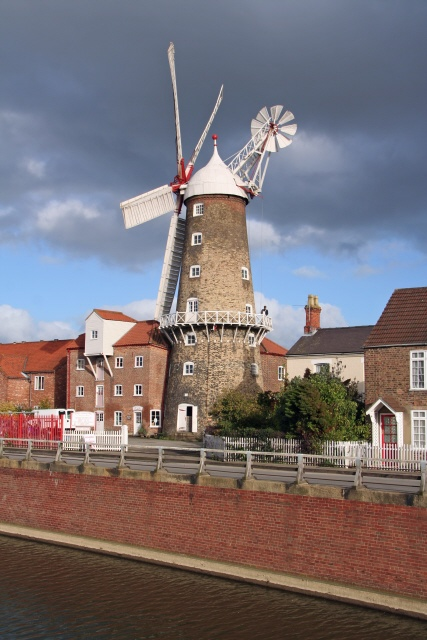
The mill tower

The seven-stage mill tower is constructed in gault brick and has Yorkshire sash windows with segmental heads on each level. It is topped with an ogee cap made of white painted timber and canvas and has five sails and a fan tail. At the third floor level is a wooden cantilevered balcony on timber brackets. The mill is accessed by a pair of planked doors up three stone steps.

The three-storey granary is built in red brick and has a hipped pantile roof with dog-toothed eaves. The granary has four bays, the second bay occupied by planked taking-in doors and the other three by Yorkshire sash windows with brick segmental heads. Above the taking-in doors is a timber-planked and gabled lucam (Note: A projecting structure in the mill roof protecting the winch from the weather.) on timber brackets.

== Equipment ==
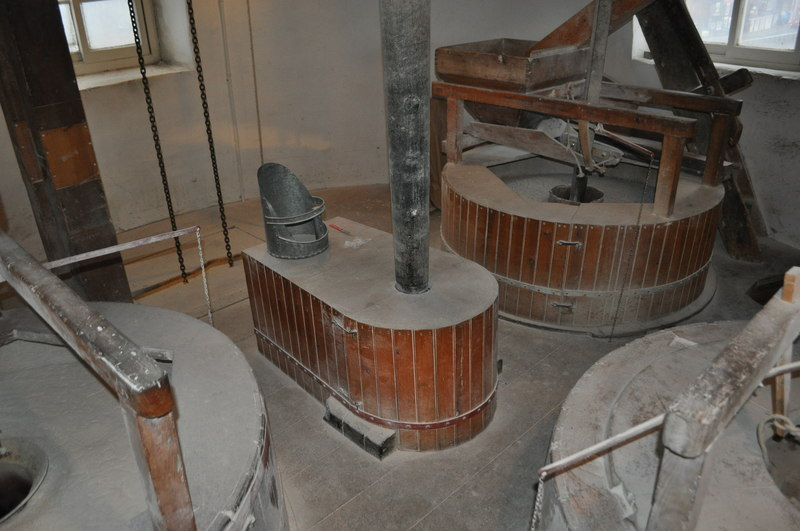
The grinding floor in 2011

The mill retains its original floor beams and mill machinery from 1819 by millwrights Norman and Smithson of Hull. The mill has three sets of grinding stones and is in working order.

The mill has five instead of the more usual four patent sails, the shutters of which are now at Wrawby post mill. An unusual feature is the weather beam (or 'rode balk') which is made of cast iron, probably replacing the original wooden one. The brake wheel is a wooden clasp-arm type with an iron tooth ring and wooden brake. The wallower is also made of iron with a wooden friction drive to the sackhoist. The dust floor is more spacious than is often found in Lincolnshire and is lit by windows.

Three pairs of grinding stones, two grey and one French, survive on the fourth floor with vats, spouts etc. all intact. The great spur wheel is made of iron, as is the upright shaft. The stone nuts have wooden cogs, as usual. The spout floor gives access to the reefing stage and contains a fine governor which controls all three pairs of stones. The bridge trees are made of iron and are Y-shaped with integral bridging boxes.
