= River Hull tidal surge barrier =

Flood barrier in Kingston upon Hull, England

- River Hull tidal barrier

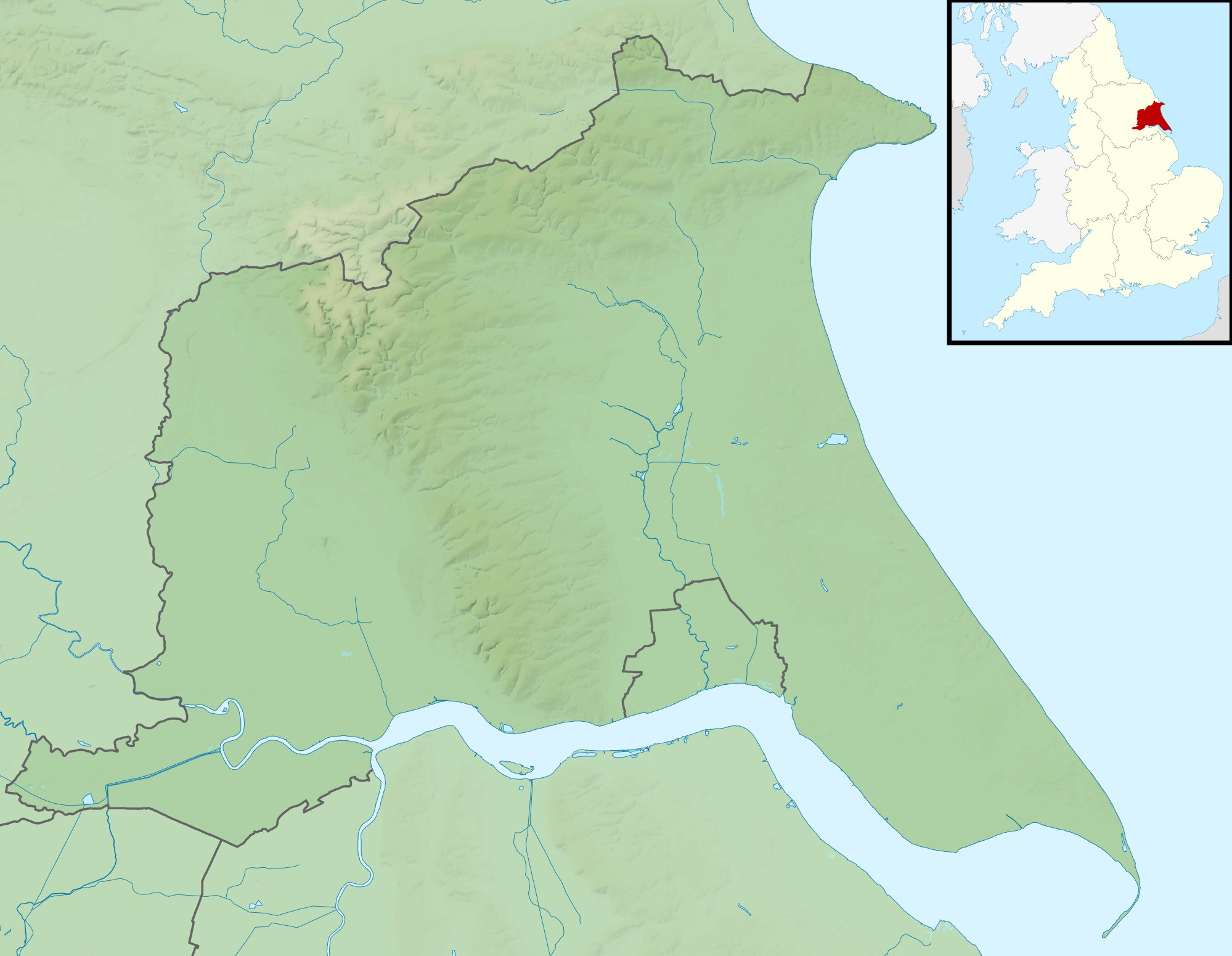
- Location of River Hull tidal surge barrier in the East Riding of Yorkshire
- Country: England
- Location: Kingston upon Hull
- Coordinates: 53.739°N 0.330°W
- Purpose: Flood control
- Status: Operational
- Construction began: January 1977
- Opening date: 15 April 1980
- Construction cost: £4.3 million (1980)
- Designed by: Shankland Cox Partnership
- Owner: Environment Agency

Dam and spillways
- Type of dam: Tidal surge barrier
- Impounds: River Hull

The River Hull tidal surge barrier is a flood control gate located on the River Hull in the city of Kingston upon Hull, in the East Riding of Yorkshire, England. The barrier impounds the river in times of tidal surges, preventing water moving upstream of the river from the Humber Estuary, and flooding the areas of the city which are near to the river, or susceptible to flooding. It is held horizontal when not in use, and turns 90 degrees before being lowered to the riverbed in the event of a tidal surge. It is the second largest flood barrier in the United Kingdom after the Thames Barrier in London.

The barrier was opened in 1980, and since then, has closed over 30 times as a preventative measure during tidal surges. A proposed lagoon to control tidal flooding in the Humber Estuary would render the River Hull non-tidal. The barrier was grade II listed in 2017, with David Neave describing it as a prominent Hull landmark.

== History ==
The need for the barrier arose after severe flooding of the city from a tidal surge in 1969. In 1971, the Yorkshire Rivers Authority engaged Mcdonald & Partners as engineers on the project, with the Shankland Cox Partnership as architects. Initially costed in 1971, the work on the barrier came to £3.8 million, but with ancillary processes and detailed studies, the final cost was £4.3 million. The location chosen for the barrier is quite close to where the river empties into the Humber Estuary on the site of the old Ha'penny Bridge. Wind testing of the structure via uses of models was undertaken at the Building Research Establishment in Garston, and hydrological testing was carried out at the hydraulics laboratory of the Department of Engineering, Cambridge University. The two towers were rooted 66 feet (20 m) below the water level and the steel supports running from the bottom to the top were rolled to a length of 112 feet (34 m), which was the longest that the British Steel Corporation had rolled steel to, at that time.

Construction on the barrier was started in January 1977, with projected opening date of August 1979, however, difficulties in the building phase led to schedule slipping. The barrier was opened on 15 April 1980 by Dennis Matthews, chairman of the Yorkshire Water Authority. (Note: The Yorkshire Rivers Authority was superseded by the Yorkshire Water Authority in 1974.) The gap between the two towers is 98 feet (30 m) wide and 85 feet (26 m) high to allow shipping to access the river beyond the barrier. The large barrier is stationed in a horizontal position when not in use, but rotates 90 degrees and is lowered when a tidal surge is forecast. The barrier then interlocks into a sill built into the riverbed. When not in use, the barrier's position elevated above the river between the two towers has been described as looking like an "..up and over garage door". The River Hull tidal surge barrier is the second largest flood barrier in the United Kingdom; only the barrier on the River Thames is larger. The height of the two towers is 98 feet (30 m), and the movable barrier that spans the two towers weighs 202 tonnes (223 tons). The barrier can be deployed within 30 minutes of a flood warning. Whilst there are motors that power the barrier into action, if any of them fail, the barrier can be hand-cranked into position within 30 minutes.

In 2010, the barrier was refurbished during a 40-day work period with maintenance being carried out some 98 feet (30 m) in the air. The £10 million work was completed in October 2010.

Writing in The Buildings of England; Yorkshire : York and the East Riding, David Neave said that it was; "..an elegant arch..." and "at night when the glazed staircases to each tower are illuminated, it is a prominent landmark." As part of the 2017 City of Culture celebrations, additional lights and texts were displayed on the barrier. The barrier was grade II listed in 2017, with the citation stating that; "the barrier successfully combines functional engineering with aesthetic quality in a slender and dramatically sculptural arch of angular planes".

== Flooding history ==
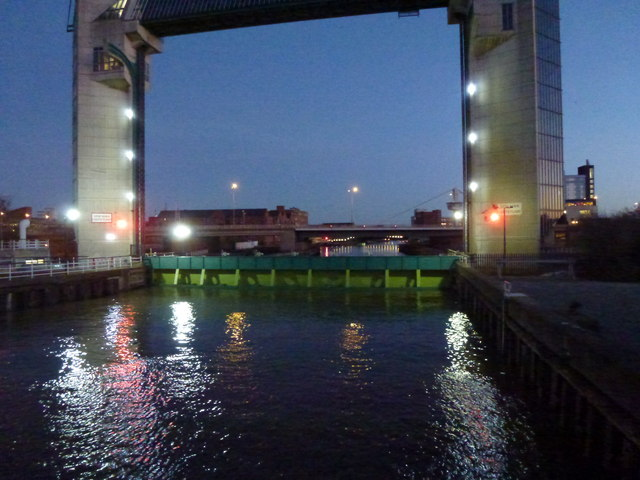
The tidal barrier in operation during a tidal surge produced by Storm Xaver in December 2013

Since the barrier was installed in 1980, it has been closed on average once a month every year.

- 1657, a tidal surge left the city under 4 feet 11 inches (1.5 m) of water
- September 1966, 16.7 feet (5.09 m) tide
- 29 September 1969, 16.72 feet (5.10 m)
- January 2005, 15.9 feet (4.8 m) tide
- November 2011, 16 feet (4.9 m) tide
- December 2013, Storm Xaver produced a tide of 19 feet (5.8 m)

== Lagoon Hull proposal ==
In 2019, a proposal to build a lagoon in the Humber Estuary was unveiled. This would involve making the River Hull non-tidal, but no mention was made in the proposal about the River Hull Barrier.

== See also ==
- Bridgwater tidal barrier
- River Foss Barrier
- Listed buildings in Kingston upon Hull (Drypool Ward)
