= River Foss Barrier =

Floodgate in York, England

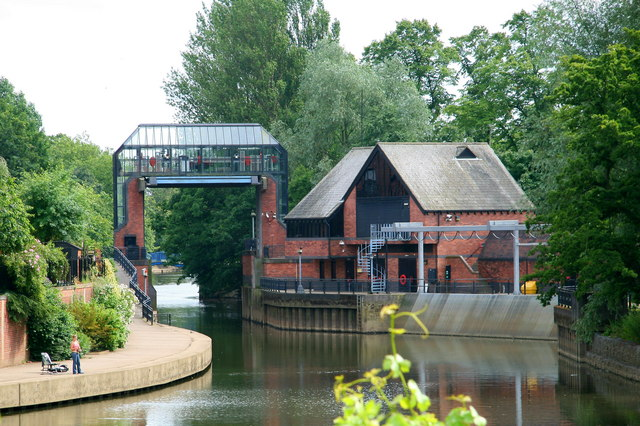
- Old (pre-2016) River Foss barrier in open position

- Location within York
- Country: England
- Location: York
- Coordinates: 53°57′08.4″N 1°04′42.3″W
- Purpose: Flood control
- Status: Operational
- Opening date: 1987 (rebuilt 2022)

Dam and spillways
- Impounds: River Foss
- Spillways: 1 (pumped)
- Spillway volumetric flow rate: 50 cubic metres per second (1,800 cu ft/s)

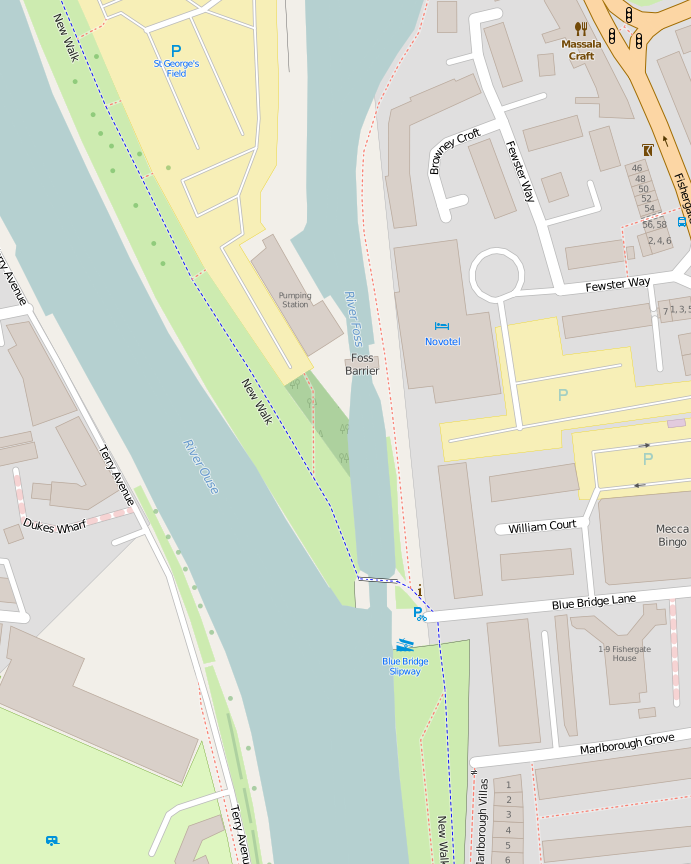
Map of Barrier

The Foss Barrier consists of a retractable floodgate and pumping station owned and managed by the Environment Agency. It straddles the River Foss in York, just above the confluence of the Foss with the River Ouse. The barrier's purpose is to prevent water from the Ouse flowing upstream into the Foss, raising water levels and flooding properties along the River Foss. The pumps next to the flood gate move water around the barrier via a side culvert so that it can continue to drain into the Ouse. This prevents water levels on the Foss rising when the barrier is closed. The Ouse's normal water level at York is approximately 5 metres (16 ft) AOD (Above Ordnance Datum). When the river level reaches 7.5 metres (25 ft) AOD, the barrier is lowered into the Foss, shutting it off from the Ouse. The electrically driven barrier takes less than five minutes to lower into position. The barrier operates as a ‘turn and lift’ gate (see below) so it opens and closes in a similar way to a garage door. The pump-house attached to the barrier maintains the water level in the Foss at around 6.5 metres (21 ft) AOD. When the flood subsides and the level of the Ouse drops back to 6.5 metres (21 ft), the levels in both rivers are equalised so the barrier opens, and the pumps shut down.

== History of the barrier and the 2015 Boxing Day Flood ==
After many years when the River Foss breached its banks and flooded surrounding properties, the York Water Authority began working on the Foss Barrier after floods in 1982. It was built at a cost of £3.4 million, and was first put into operation and tested in 1987. The book the Buildings of England - Yorkshire; York and the East Riding describes the barrier as "..a striking and practical contribution to the river scene.."

Before construction, an analysis was carried out to determine the realistic maximum flow rates of the River Foss during an event. This indicated that a flow of 30.4 cubic metres per second (1,070 cu ft/s) was very unlikely to be exceeded. As a result, the pumping station capacity was set to 30 cumecs, but at the height of the Boxing Day floods of 2015, the water rate was 35 cubic metres per second (1,200 cu ft/s). The height of the water in the River Ouse was so high, it was about to overwhelm the pumping station which diverts water from the Foss into the Ouse. So a decision was taken to raise the barrier to prevent a backing up of water in the Foss, but this meant the water had no escape and several hundred properties were flooded.

== Improvements ==
Following the 2015 Boxing Day event £38 million was allocated to upgrade the barrier and the surrounding infrastructure, which was completed in 2022. The improvement with the highest priority was to increase pumping capacity at the barrier. A similar study to the one conducted for the original barrier was carried out and found that the capacity should be raised to 50 cumecs. The higher discharge rates are mainly due to climate change and land use changes which result in water reaching the river more quickly due to there being a greater area of impermeable surfaces in the Foss catchment to allow for infiltration to occur. This causes rivers to fill up more quickly than in the past. A higher pumping capacity has been achieved by installing eight new 500 kW pumps of the same size into the existing holes of the old pumps. Using pumps of a different size would have caused significant delays to the project. Modern technology allowed the same number and size of pumps to be used whilst still increasing the maximum pumping capacity by more than 65%. Each pump weighs 6.5 tonnes and has variable speeds to give operators more control over water levels on the Foss. In comparison, the old pumps could only be switched on or off and had no variable speeds. Work began in September 2016 to replace the pumps with each pump taking a week to install. The barrier was operational with maximum pumping capacity by the winter of 2017

The Foss Barrier gate also needed replacing so that it meets standards set by other improved flood defences in York. In 2021 a new gate that is 40 centimetres (16 in) taller and weighing 18 tonnes (20 tons) was installed. This is the largest size the gate could be and still fit into the existing rotate and lift mechanism.

Another upgrade was to increase the resilience of the station to withstand flooding. This was achieved by building an extra storey onto the original building to raise the electrics above flood level making the operation of the barrier and pumping station flood proof. Instead of using bricks, a steel frame was used to house this extra storey. This made the structure lighter so that the existing foundations didn't need fortifying, as this would have delayed the project significantly. Two new independently sourced high voltage power supplies have been connected to the site, in case one is compromised during a flood event. In the event that both power supplies fail, there are four backup diesel generators capable of running the pumps at full capacity. These generators are situated on the newly built platform so they are above the height of the floodwaters. A large fuel tank can supply the generators running at full capacity for 48 hours. If an event lasts longer than this there is a pipe that runs from the tank to Tower Street so it can be refilled during an event. A fifth separate, smaller generator can run the rest of the building's electrics.

== Looking forwards and other flood defence scheme ==
The York Flood Alleviation Scheme project team designed this defence so that it can protect York from extreme flood events up until 2039. This includes future rises in river levels due to climate change and changes in land use. After this point, the Environment Agency plans to have additional measures in place upstream of York to reduce river levels, such as natural flood management. These will ‘slow the flow’ and manage river levels throughout the Swale, Ure, Nidd and Ouse catchments. On the River Foss, the Environment Agency has started work to build a flood storage area north-east of Strensall. This will reduce the risk of flooding to almost 500 properties downstream.

The Foss Barrier is part of a wider scheme that includes weirs, dams, temporary storage schemes, floodwalls and barriers that all contribute to reducing flood risk in the event of an extraordinary weather event.

== Gallery ==
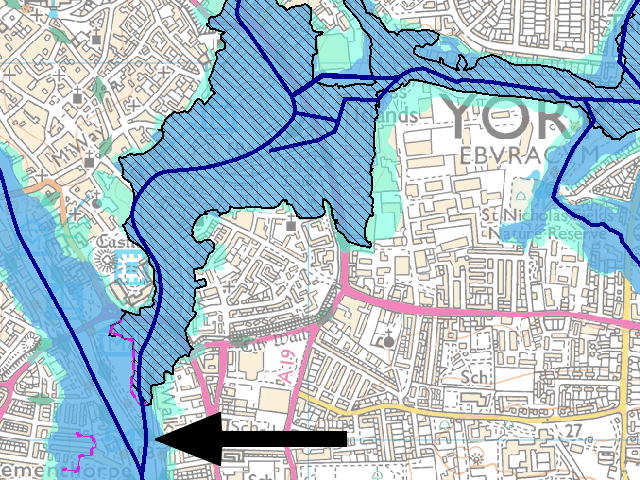
River Foss barrier protected zone

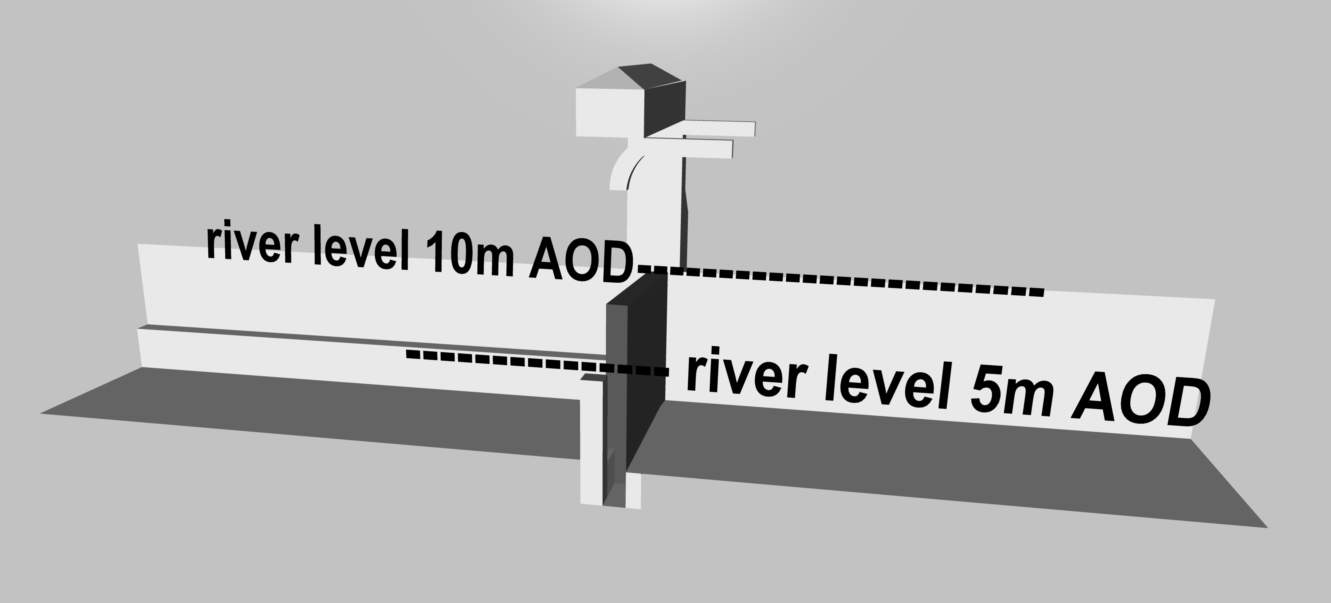
side view without retaining wall

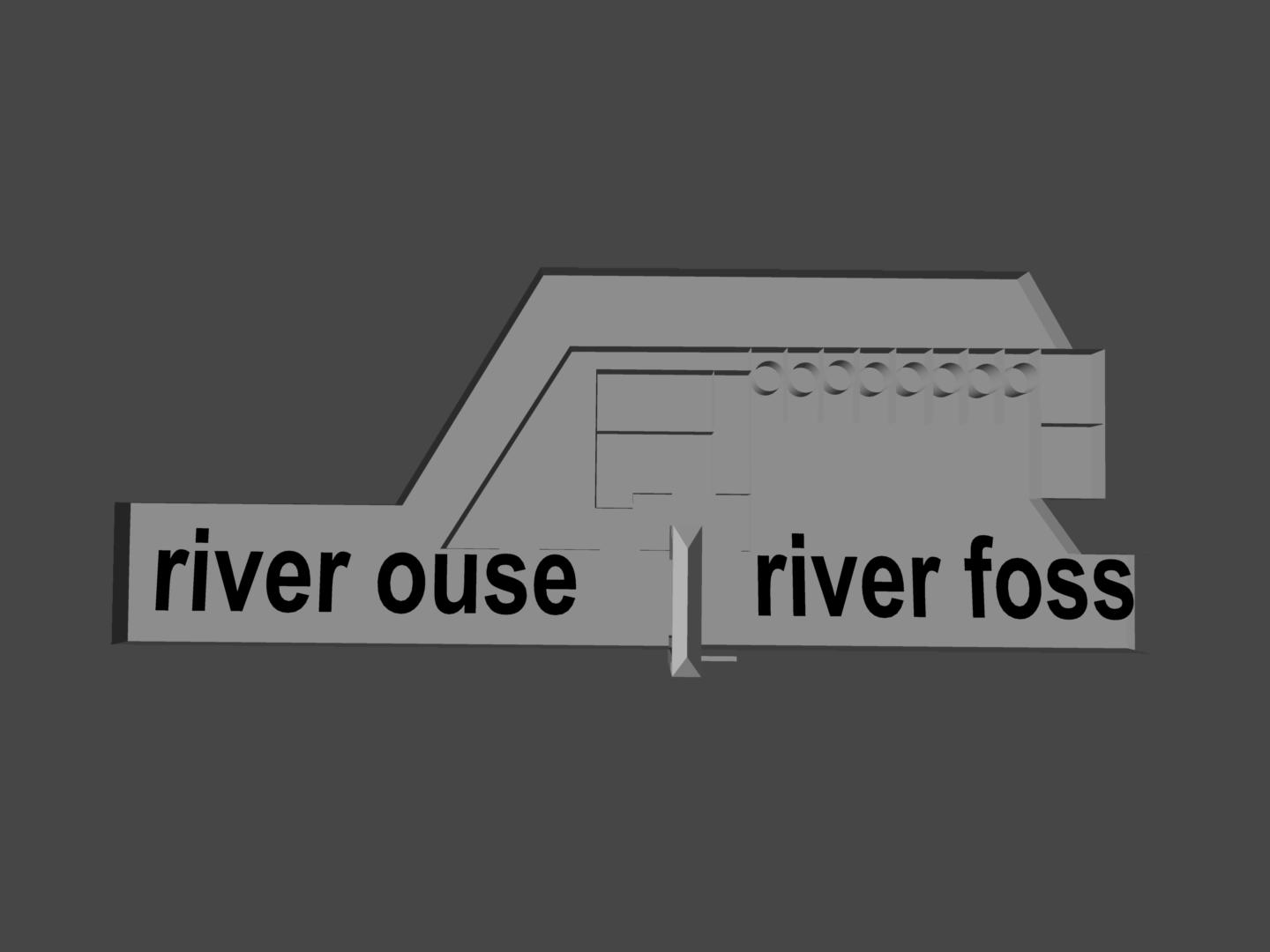
Top view of Foss river barrier

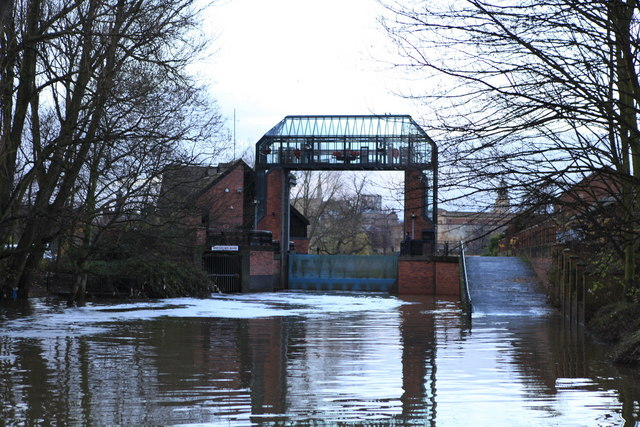
Old (pre-2016) Foss River Barrier in closed position

Animation of barrier operation

Barrier fail

== See also ==
- Bridgwater tidal barrier
- River Hull tidal surge barrier
