= Bridgwater tidal barrier =

Tidal flood barrier in Somerset, England

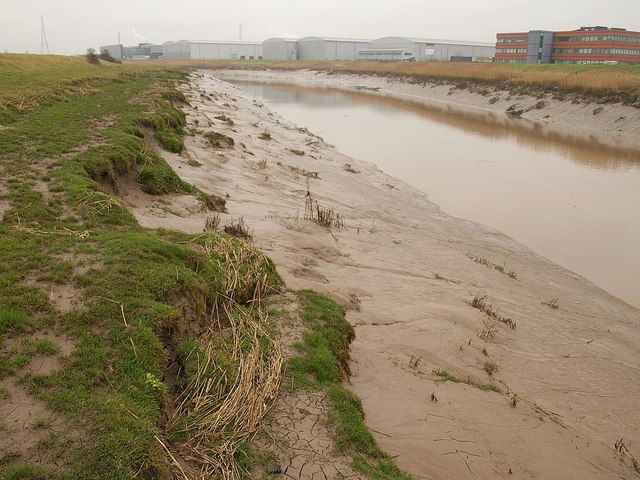
- The intended location of the barrier

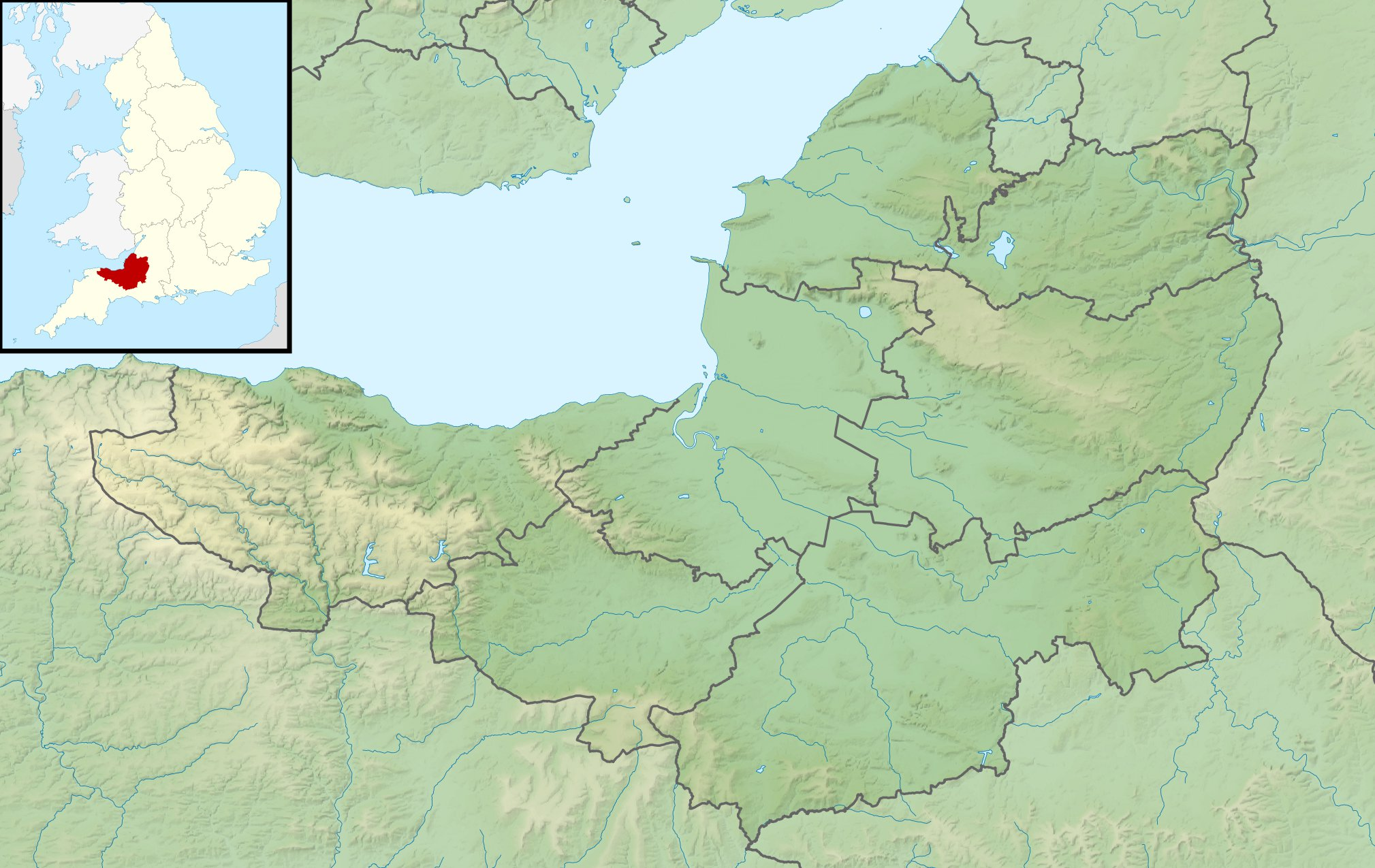
- Location within Somerset
- Country: England
- Location: Bridgwater, Somerset
- Coordinates: 51.1466°N 2.9982°W
- Purpose: Flood control
- Status: Under construction
- Construction began: 2023
- Opening date: 2027 (proposed)
- Construction cost: £249 million (2025)

Dam and spillways
- Type of dam: Tidal surge barrier
- Impounds: River Parrett
- Dam volume: Variable
- Website www.somerset.gov.uk/beaches-ports-and-flooding/bridgwater-tidal-barrier/

Bridgwater tidal barrier will be a flood control gate located on the River Parrett in Bridgwater, Somerset, England. The River Parrett is tidal for some 9 miles (14 km) upstream of Bridgwater, and the combination of flooding on the Somerset Levels and high tides reaching up the Bristol Channel, have a detrimental effect on the whole area. In 2022, a tidal flood gate was approved to be installed at a cost of £249 million, which is expected to be operational by 2027.

== History ==
=== 20th Century flooding ===
Historically, flooding on the River Parrett has occurred when both excess rainwater and high tides in the Bristol Channel, backflow upstream on the river. In December 1929, serious flooding upstream at Lyng and Athelney was in danger of overwhelming those villages, and to prevent this, the locals suggested cutting the dykes, but this would release a "tidal wave" 5 feet (1.5 m) high, and combined with near 7 feet (2.1 m) incoming tide, it was feared mass flooding would occur in the Bridgwater area. However, by early 1930, the locals had abandoned this idea and they seem "resigned to their fate." Several times, locals on the Somerset Levels have complained that their settlements have been sacrificed to save Bridgwater, but one Environment Agency official noted that that is what the Somerset Levels are supposed to do; retain the floodwater and release it slowly.

Serious floods occurred in 1960, and as a result, defences against flooding were built along the Parrett catchment. One of the suggestions put forward after the 2014 floods was to build a giant lagoon in Bridgwater Bay which could generate electricity through the flowing of the tides, but could be allowed to store fresh floodwater and release it into the sea at low tide. Future flooding is based on modelling and estimates from the Environment Agency, which detail an increase of 20% of peak flow in all watercourses, coupled with a sea level rise of 500 millimetres (20 in) by the year 2100.

=== 21st century barrier proposals ===
In December 2019, proposals for the barrier were submitted in response to severe flooding in Somerset in 2014. (Note: A proposal for a £7.1 million (equivalent to £17,558,000 in 2025) tidal barrier downstream of Bridgwater was suggested in 1990. This would allow sea-going vessels to still access the port at Bridgwater.) The suggestion of a barrier after the flooding of 2014 estimated a cost of £30 million. The 2019 plan was costed at £99 million, and was expected to be delivered and operational by 2023, but this was delayed and government approval was not given until January 2022, with a view to the barrier being fully operational in 2027.

== Construction ==
Works on the site started in May 2023, beginning with an access road on the western bank of the river from the village of Chilton Trinity. A bypass channel was also created in 2023 to allow for the foundations to be built in the river, and in February 2025, the whole project was costed at £249 million. The western bank road is now named Barrier Way, and from April 2024 onwards, it provides a route to the site of the works. In March 2025, a jack-up barge (the Haven SeaSeven) arrived on site to allow a stable platform in the marine environment, such as allowing a cofferdam to be built.

When complete, the scheme will provide protection for 11,300 homes, and 1,500 businesses along the river, which is tidal up until Oath Lock, some 9 miles (14 km) upstream of Bridgwater. The scheme will also see construction of new flood defences downstream of the barrier, and improvements to the fish and eel passes at twelve locations upstream of the barrier. The design of the barrier has two vertical lift gates that can be dropped down to stem the flow of an incoming tide, and the location will also provide a pedestrian footbridge across the river. The two gates are expected to be 15 metres (49 ft) wide, and 10 metres (33 ft) high, and it is anticipated that the gates will operate one to five times each year for flood protection, and up to 30 times annually for maintenance.

== See also ==
- Barking Creek
- River Foss Barrier
- River Hull tidal surge barrier
- Thames Barrier
