= Priestman Brothers =

English engineering company

- Industry: Engineering
- Founded: 1870
- Founder: William Dent Priestman, Samuel Priestman
- Headquarters: Kingston upon Hull, England
- Products: Excavators, cranes, dredging machinery

Priestman Brothers was an engineering company based in Kingston upon Hull, England that manufactured diggers, dredgers, cranes and other industrial machinery. In the later 1800s the company also produced the Priestman Oil Engine, an early design of oil fuelled internal combustion engine.

== History ==
=== Priestman family ownership (1870–1895) ===
The company was founded in 1870; William Dent Priestman bought the Holderness Foundry with money from his father, a Leeds corn-miller. William's brother Samuel also joined the company.

It is said the company's entry into the construction of dredging equipment began in 1876 when they were asked to construct machinery to recover lost gold from the sea west of the coast of Spain. No gold was found but the company's equipment proved useful for dredging of harbours and docks; the company pioneered the manufacture of steam powered cranes with grab (clamshell) buckets.

From 1888 to 1904 the company produced various versions of the Priestman Oil Engine, an early example of an internal combustion engine. Models were produced with engine power from 2 hp (1.5 kW) up to 60 hp (45 kW) for a double cylindered version. The company opened a factory in Philadelphia (USA) in 1892, also producing engines. In 1894 the company produced one of the earliest recorded examples of an internal combustion engine for railway, based on an 1888 prototype – the 20 h.p. two axle machine was tested on the Hull Docks.

In 1895 bad debts and a decline in sales made the company insolvent, the business was reformed but William and Samuel lost their seats on the board.

=== Public ownership (1895–) ===
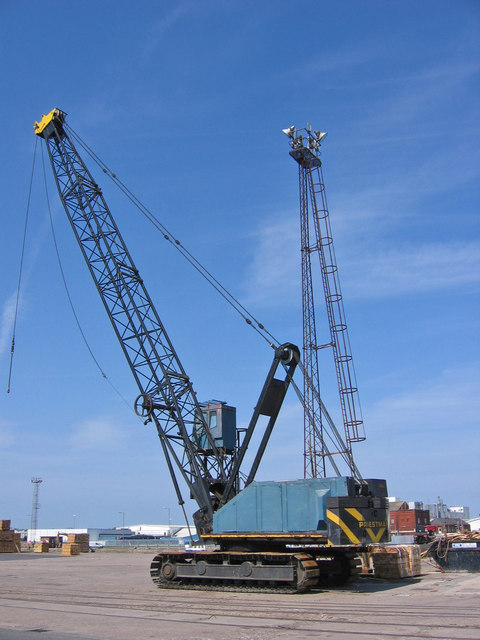
Priestman crane, Albert Dock, Hull (2007)

The company was reformed and began business again; after the First World War its products were used in the rebuilding of French villages, in 1921 a machine for digging field drainage drains was produced and the company received investment from the Ministry of Agriculture.

The company constructed a factory in Marfleet, Hull in 1950, which eventually covered 63 acres (250,000 m^{2}).

In 1928 production of excavators named after animals began; models named "Lion", "Tiger" and "Panther" were produced.

The company merged with Coles Cranes of Sunderland in 1970.

In 1972 the Steels Group, Priestman's parent company, was taken over by the Acrow Group.

The Priestman division was sold off in 1984 and was eventually merged with Coles Cranes. The remnants of the company are owned by Gardner Denver, and it no longer supports the Priestman range of products.

The Priestman Grab & VC Excavators Divisions were sold to RB International, this business continues to be supported by Delden Cranes Ltd, through their RB Cranes Division.
