= Isaac Reckitt =

English businessman (1792–1862)

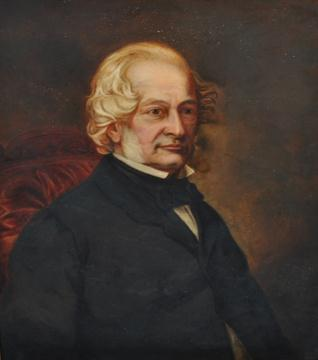
- Born: 1792
- Died: 1862 (aged 69–70)
- Occupation: Businessman
- Known for: Founder of Reckitt and Sons
- Children: 7, inc. Sir James Reckitt, 1st Baronet

Isaac Reckitt (1792–1862) was the founder of Reckitt and Sons, a business that emerged to become Reckitt, one of the United Kingdom's largest consumer goods businesses.

== Career ==
Initially establishing a milling business in Boston, Lincolnshire, with his older brother, and then a corn business in Nottingham on his own, Isaac Reckitt acquired a starch-making business in Hull in 1840. Under his leadership the business diversified into black lead and washing blue manufacturing.

By the time of his death in 1862, the business employed 210 people and had become one of the most successful businesses in Hull.

The firm was left equally to three of his sons, George (1825–1900), Francis (1827–1917) and James (1833–1924).

== See also ==
- Reckitt baronets
