= Ernest Bader =

Swiss chemical company executive

Ernest Bader (24 November 1890 – 5 February 1982) and his wife, Dora Scott, founded a chemical company, Scott Bader, and gave it to the employees under terms of Common ownership, forming the Scott Bader Commonwealth in 1951.

Scott Bader Ltd. was founded in 1921 with office premises in Finsbury Square, London, and moved to Wollaston, Northamptonshire, in 1943. It makes synthetic resins and composite materials. Since 1951, it has expanded and is now international, employing around 700 people. Originally of Swiss nationality, Ernest Bader had been a conscientious objector in his home country. He was a Quaker, co-founder of the Campaign for Nuclear Disarmament in 1957, and a member of the Committee of 100 (United Kingdom). Influential in Bader's thinking were the Society of Friends which he joined in 1945, the 17th century Quaker George Fox, Mahatma Gandhi, John Middleton Murry, Wilfred Wellock, and Canon John Collins with whom he establish Demintry (Society for Democratic Integration in Industry) in 1958.

When he died in 1982, aged 91, at his home in Wollaston, Bader owned no personal business assets, private house, or car.
