= Reckitt baronets =

Extinct baronetcy in the Baronetage of the United Kingdom

Escutcheon of the Reckitt baronets of Swanland Manor

The Reckitt baronetcy, of Swanland Manor in the Parish of North Ferriby in the East Riding of the County of York, was a title in the Baronetage of the United Kingdom. It was created on 17 July 1894 for the businessman and philanthropist James Reckitt. The second Baronet sat as member of parliament for Pontefract and Brigg. The title became extinct on the death of the third Baronet in 1944.

== Reckitt baronets, of Swanland Manor (1894) ==
- Sir James Reckitt, 1st Baronet (1833–1924)
- Sir Harold James Reckitt, 2nd Baronet (1868–1930)
- Sir Philip Bealby Reckitt, 3rd Baronet (1873–1944). He left no heir, and the title became extinct.

Baronetage of the United Kingdom
Preceded by Austin baronets	Reckitt baronets of Swanland Manor; 17 July 1894	Succeeded by Tyler baronets
