= William Dent Priestman =

British engineer (1847–1936)

- Born: 23 August 1847; Sutton-on-Hull, Kingston upon Hull, England
- Died: 7 September 1936 (aged 89); Kingston upon Hull
- Education: Bootham School
- Known for: internal combustion oil engine pioneer

William Dent Priestman (23 August 1847 – 7 September 1936), born near Kingston upon Hull, was a Quaker and engineering pioneer, inventor of the Priestman Oil Engine, and co-founder of the Priestman Brothers engineering company with his brother Samuel as manufacturers of cranes, winches and excavators. Priestman Brothers built the earliest recorded railway locomotive powered by an internal combustion engine.

== Biography ==
William, along with ten other offspring, was the son of Leeds corn-miller (and latterly NER director) Samuel Priestman.

He was educated at Bootham School in York then apprenticed at the Humber Iron Works, and later at the North Eastern Railway (NER) in Gateshead. In 1869, he joined William Armstrong & Company, the engineering company owned by William Armstrong, which later became Armstrong Whitworth.

William’s father purchased the Holderness Foundry in Hull and began doing business independently; William’s brother joined their father at the company, which later became Priestman Brothers.

In the 1870s, a licence to manufacture petrol engines (of a type designed by Eugène Etève, similar to Étienne Lenoir's engines) was obtained. The dangers and insurance costs of engines that run on highly flammable petrol caused him to investigate the use of lamp oil in internal combustion engines. He obtained patents, including a patent for an oil vaporiser in 1885. His investigations led him to develop one of the first reliable engines to work on a fuel heavier (more viscous and with a higher boiling point) than petrol, known as the 'Priestman Oil Engine'.

In 1894 William and Samuel Priestman were given the John Scott Award for their engine.

Having lost control of the Priestman company in 1895 following insolvency William spent the rest of his life helping others. He died in Hull in 1936.

== Legacy ==
=== The Priestman Oil Engine ===
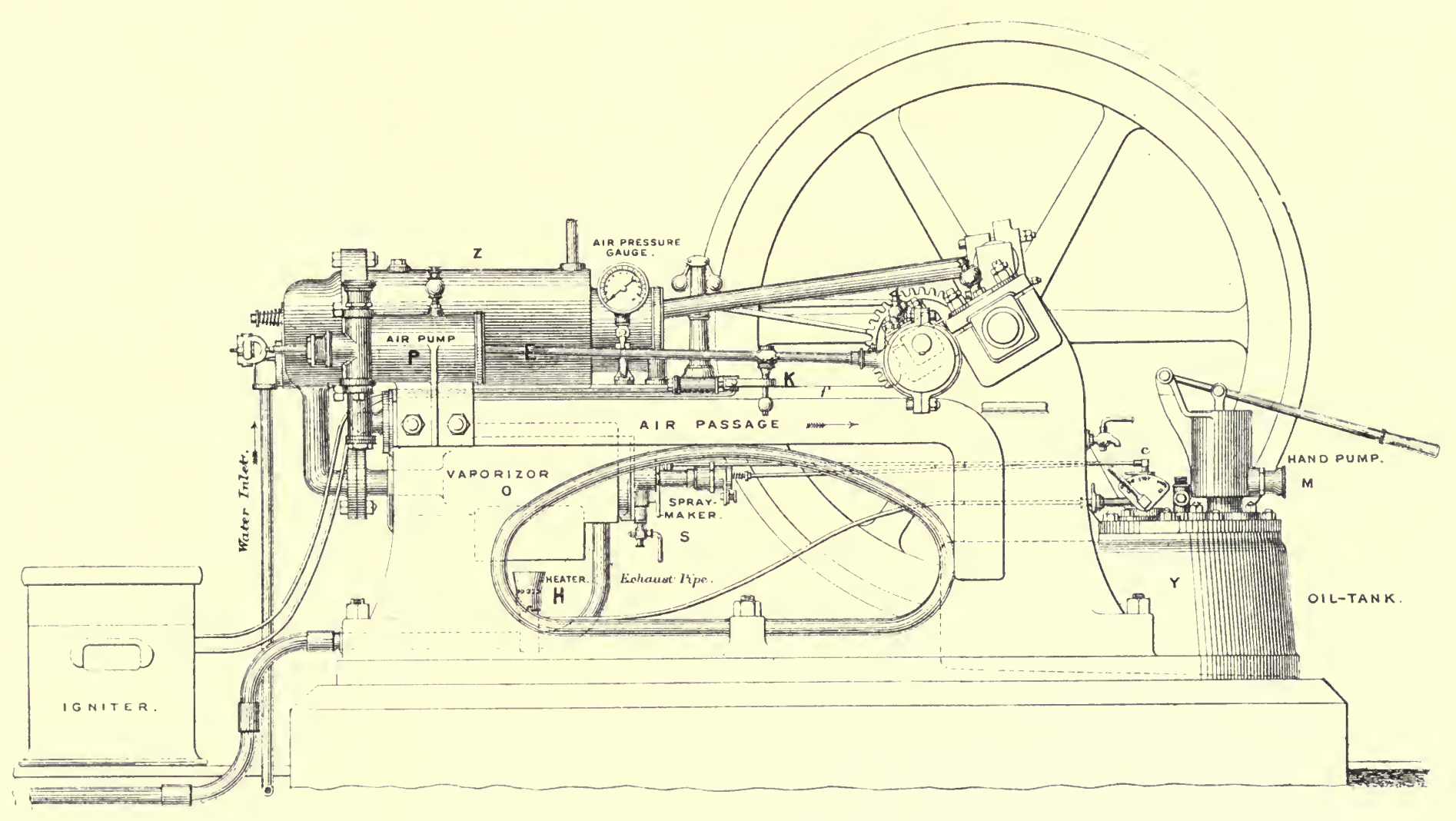
Diagram of Priestman Oil Engine from The Steam engine and gas and oil engines (1900) by John Perry

The Priestman Oil Engine used a pressurised fuel tank and fuel injection through a nozzle into a chamber heated by exhaust gasses in order to create a suitably combustible mixture in the cylinder. Incomplete vaporisation of the fuel resulted in some condensation on the walls of the cylinder; as a result the fuel lubricated the cylinder as well as providing power. The engine also controlled the speed by connections between valves on the fuel inlets and a speed governor. Ignition was by electric spark.

The engine was manufactured from 1888 to 1904 with over 1,000 units produced, largely for use on barges. One engine was trialled on the Hull and Barnsley Railway powering a shunting locomotive; this is the earliest known example of a locomotive powered by an internal combustion engine.

One engine has been preserved as a stationary exhibit at the Streetlife Museum of Transport in Kingston upon Hull. The engine design was recognised by the Engineering Heritage Hallmark Scheme awarded by the Institution of Mechanical Engineers in 2000 for its significance in British engineering history.

=== Priestman Brothers ===
The company founded by William and Samuel Priestman produced diggers and dredgers as well as engines; in 1895 the company became bankrupt, and the brothers lost control of the firm. The company continued in the business of producing diggers and dredgers well into the latter half of the 20th century.

=== Other ===
In addition to his contribution to industry Priestman was also credited with inducing Sir Edward Fry to introduce an initial draft of the Bribery and Illicit Communications Act.

== See also ==
- Hornsby-Akroyd oil engine
- History of the internal combustion engine
