= James Reckitt =

English businessman (1833–1924)

Sir James Reckitt
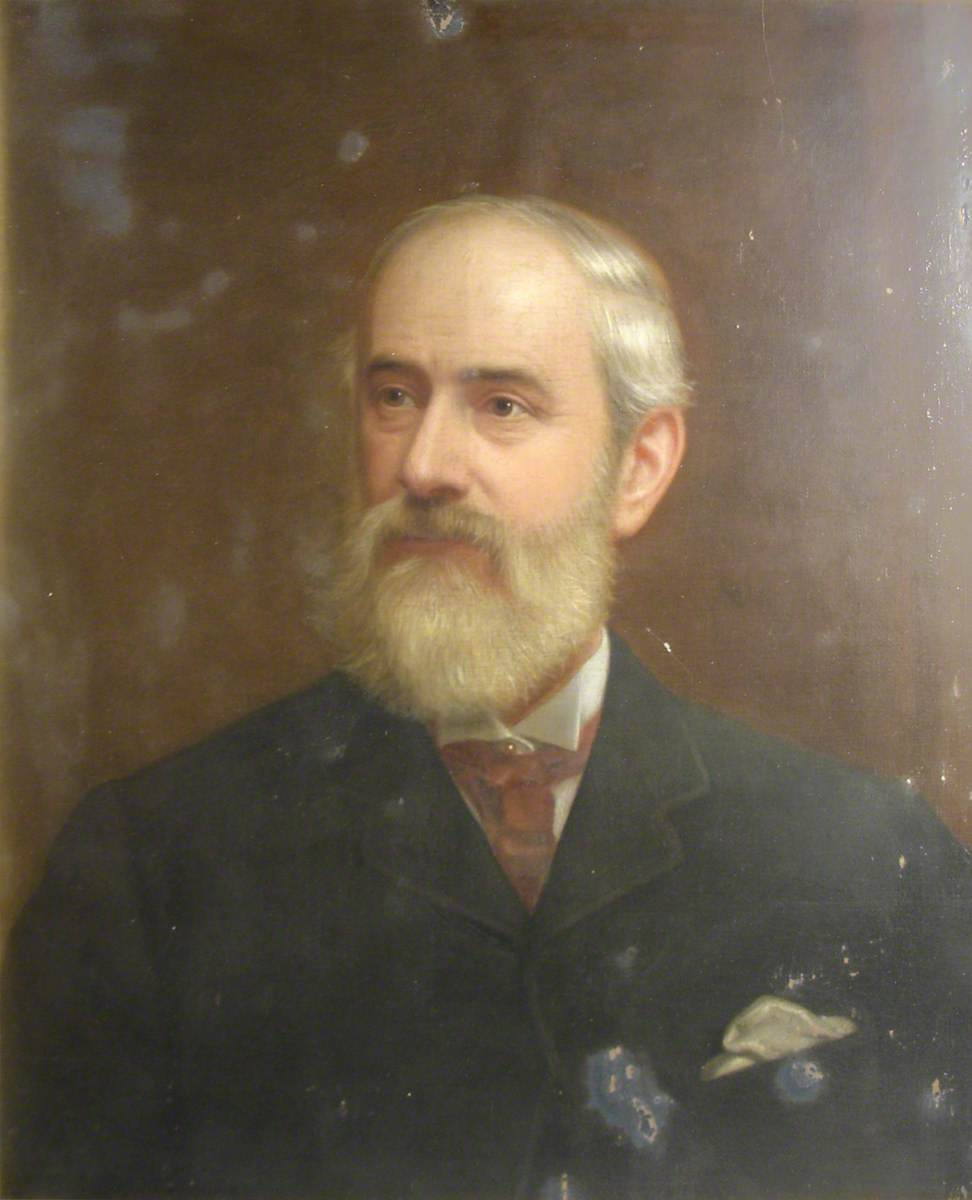
- Born: 15 November 1833; Nottingham, England
- Died: 18 March 1924 (aged 90); Swanland, England
- Occupation: Businessman
- Known for: Philanthropy, founder of Reckitt and Sons, formerly Reckitts & Colman, now Reckitt Benckiser

Sir James Reckitt, 1st Baronet (15 November 1833 – 18 March 1924) was a founder of the household products company Reckitt and Sons, developed from his father Isaac Reckitt's starch and laundry blue business.

== Biography ==
James Reckitt was born 15 November 1833 in Nottingham, sixth child of Isaac Reckitt (1792-1862), miller; and Anne (née Coleby). He attended Ackworth School, near Pontefract, before, in 1848 entering his father's starch and laundry blue business as a travelling salesman. In 1865 he married Kathleen (née Saunders) by whom he had two sons.

After his father's death in 1862, James and his two brothers continued their father's business; the firm was incorporated as Reckitt & Sons Ltd. in 1879. The company grew, using heavy advertising and marketing as one means of promotion, and its starch, blue and boot polishes became successful products internationally. In 1888 the company became a private joint-stock company, and in 1899 a public company, with a value of £1.7 million.

Reckitt was an active philanthropist, with numerous charitable works in Hull, and in the East Riding of Yorkshire. Amongst his work was the Garden Village (1908), a 600 home model village built for his workers in Hull which was run as a non-profit organisation during his lifetime; the James Reckitt Public Library in Hull (1889) which he established and endowed; he also financed the building of a hospital in Withernsea, and contributed to the Newland Homes for Seamen's orphans home, and was active in the early promotion of the Hull Royal Infirmary. During World War I, he hosted a Voluntary Aid Detachment hospital at the Reckitt & Sons factory and housed Belgian refugees at his home. He established the Sir James Reckitt Charity (1921) which supports charitable and Quaker organisations. As a pastime he was a collector of art.

Reckitt was active in local politics, with roles including JP, County Councillor, Deputy Lieutenant (of the East Riding); he was a member of the Liberal Party. In 1894 he was awarded a baronetcy in recognition of his public and political service.

He died at Swanland Manor on 18 March 1924.

Baronetage of the United Kingdom
New creation	Baronet (of Swanland Manor); 1894–1924	Succeeded by Harold Reckitt
