= Aike Beck =

Former watercourse in the East Riding of Yorkshire, England

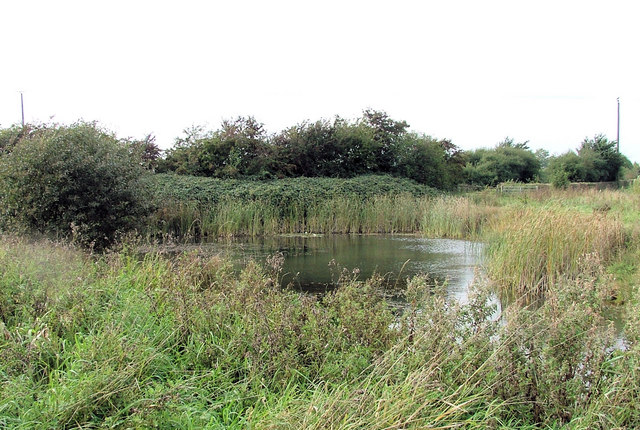
- A small pond near Beck Lane, Aike is the only part of Aike Beck still in water

Specifications
- Locks: 2
- Status: defunct

History
- Original owner: Hotham family
- Date completed: 1790s
- Date closed: 1850s

Geography
- Start point: Lockington Landing
- End point: Aike
- Connects to: River Hull

Aike Beck or the Lockington Navigation was a stream in the East Riding of Yorkshire, England, which was constructed as a navigation in the late 18th century, and ceased to function as such in the 1850s. The water supply came from Bryan Mills Beck and Scorborough Beck, but in 1988, these were diverted to feed into Arram Beck, and most of the channel was filled in with material from the flood banks.

== History ==
Aike Beck joined the River Hull 0.4 miles (0.64 km) above its junction with the Leven Canal. Navigable for no more than 2 miles (3.2 km) from the river, its main function was to carry coal, and it had two canal locks taking craft of 40 feet by 8 feet 10 inches (12 m x 2.7 m). One was an entrance lock where the Beck joined the River Hull, and the other was about halfway along the navigation. Below the middle lock, Aike Beck was enlarged, while above it, the course of the navigation was made much straighter than the original course of the beck. Coal and agricultural fertiliser was transferred from keel boats to the smaller, shallow draughted boats used on the navigation, and hauled by horse or manpower to Lockington wharf.

The navigation was constructed in the late 18th century by the Hotham family who owned large amounts of land in the area. Aike Beck crossed over the Beverley and Barmston Drain with the drain culverted underneath; one of eleven similar structures required to allow the drain to cross existing waterways. (Note: The Beverey and Barmston drain runs to the west of, and parallel to, the Driffield Navigation and River Hull. It was authorised by the Beverley Barmston Drainage Act, which was passed by parliament in 1798. The civil engineer for the project was William Chapman, who had submitted the original plans in 1796.) In 1809 engineer William Chapman reported to the drainage commissioners that the locks on the navigation had raised water levels and caused flooding.

As part of an agreement with Lord Hotham to not oppose the construction of the Hull and Selby Railway (Bridlington branch) in the 1840s, the proprietors of the line agreed not to provide coal handling facilities in the vicinity of his canal.

It is thought to have ceased to be used for navigation in the 1850s, as it appears to be derelict on the 1855 Ordnance Survey map, where both the second lock and the coal basin at Lockington are marked "old". By the time the 1891 map was published, the final section from the beck to the coal wharf had disappeared altogether, and the lock gates must have been removed, as the beck is marked as tidal to beyond the coal wharf junction.

The Beck was supplied with water by Bryan Mills Beck and Scorborough Beck. The latter was also used for navigation in the early 19th century.

In 1988, Aike and Arram Beck were altered, removing Aike Beck's connection to the River Hull completely. The waters of Scorborough Beck and Bryan Mills Beck were routed southwards along a catchwater drain, which runs beside the railway line to join Arram Beck. The original course of the navigation was largely filled in, using material from the embankments on either side of the channel. All that remains is a small section containing water near Beck Lane in Aike, and a slight indentation in the bank of the Hull where Aike Beck used to enter.

The former junction of Aike Beck with the river marks the point at which the Driffield Navigation, upstream from the junction, becomes the River Hull, below it.

== Location ==
Situated on the Driffield Navigation

- Next place upstream = Wilfholme Landing
- Next place downstream = Leven Canal

== Points of interest ==
| Point | Coordinates (Links to map resources) | OS Grid Ref | Notes |
|---|---|---|---|
| Lockington Landing | 53.9077°N 0.4373°W | TA027468 | Coal wharf |
| Second lock | 53.9022°N 0.4186°W | TA040462 | |
| Entrance lock | 53.8959°N 0.3964°W | TA054456 | Jn with River Hull |

== See also ==
- Canals of the United Kingdom
- History of the British canal system

== Bibliography ==
- Addyman, John F.; Fawcett, Bill, eds. (2013). A History of the Hull and Scarborough Railway. North Eastern Railway Association. ISBN 978-1-905505-30-2.
- Duckham, Baron F. (1973). The Inland Waterways of East Yorkshire 1700–1900 (PDF). East Yorkshire Local History Society. ISBN 978-0-900349-29-4. Archived from the original (PDF) on 22 March 2012.
- Hadfield, Charles (1973). The Canals of Yorkshire and North East England (Vol 2). David and Charles. ISBN 978-0-7153-5975-4.
- Reid, Ian; Harris, Joy; Walker, Colin (2014). Becks, Banks, Drains and Brains. East Riding of Yorkshire Council (River Hull Valley Drainage Heritage Group). ISBN 978-0-9552912-1-0.
- Skempton, Sir Alec (2002). A Biographical Dictionary of Civil Engineers in Great Britain and Ireland: 1500 to 1830. Thomas Telford. ISBN 978-0-7277-2939-2.
