= Leven Canal =

Canal in the East Riding of Yorkshire, England

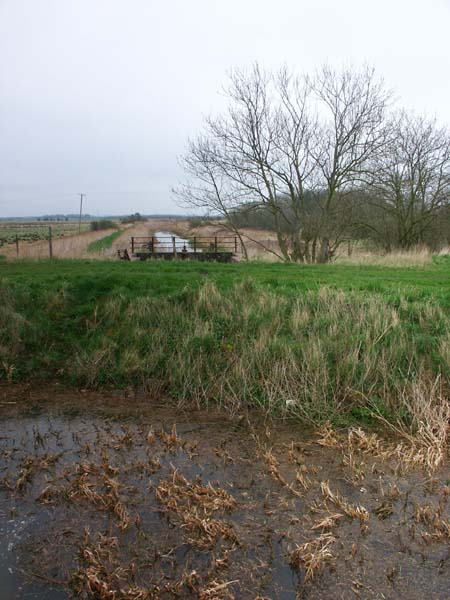
- The entrance of the canal as seen from the river

Specifications
- Length: 3.18 miles (5.12 km)
- Maximum boat length: 64 ft 0 in (19.51 m)
- Maximum boat beam: 14 ft 9 in (4.50 m)
- Locks: 1
- Status: Part watered SSSI

History
- Original owner: Mrs Charlotta Bethell
- Principal engineer: William Jessop
- Date of act: 1801
- Date completed: 1805
- Date closed: 1935

Geography
- Start point: Leven
- End point: River Hull
- Connects to: River Hull Navigation

The Leven Canal runs for 3.18 miles (5.1 km) from the River Hull to the village of Leven, East Riding of Yorkshire, England. It was built for Mrs Charlotta Bethell in 1805, and remained in use until 1935. It is now a Site of Special Scientific Interest.

== Location ==
The Leven Canal runs from the River Hull between Arram and Aike, to the south end of the village of Leven. It borders the Leven Carrs in the north, and Eske and Routh Carrs in the south. As it enters Leven it passes Little Leven. Just upstream on the River Hull is the start of the Driffield Navigation.

Situated on the River Hull

- Next place upstream = Aike Beck
- Next place downstream = Arram Beck

== History ==
The idea of a canal to Leven was first proposed in 1786. The low-lying area to the west of Leven had been drained in the 1760s by the construction of the Holderness Drain, which ran broadly parallel to the River Hull and entered the Humber Estuary at an outfall downstream of the mouth of the River Hull. The Drainage Commissioners asked the canal engineer William Jessop to look at proposals for a navigation from the outfall to Monk Bridge, a little to the south of Leven. Jessop reported that the extra cost of making the drain navigable for boats drawing 4.5 feet (1.4 m), which included two locks and several passing places, would be £5,136, but no further action was taken.

A second scheme was proposed by some promoters in September 1791, which would follow a similar alignment, and they got as far as presenting a petition to parliament in March of the following year, but nothing came of it. Interest died down until 1801, when there were two rival proposals for canals to Leven. The first envisioned a canal from below Hull Bridge, running in a north-easterly direction to Skirlaugh bridge, with a branch to Monk bridge, to serve the town. The second was for a much simpler scheme, running eastwards from the River Hull near Aike Beck to Leven, to be privately funded by Mrs Bethell.

Hull and Leven Canal Act 1801
- Act of Parliament
- Parliament of the United Kingdom
- Long title: An act for enabling Charlotta Bethell, widow, to make and maintain a navigable canal from the river Hull, at a point in the parish of Leven, near the boundary between Eske and Leven Carrs, in the east riding of the county of York to Leven bridge, in the said riding.
- Citation: 41 Geo. 3. (U.K.) c. xxxii
- Territorial extent: United Kingdom

Dates
- Royal assent: 21 May 1801
- Commencement: 21 May 1801 (Note: The Acts of Parliament (Commencement) Act 1793.)
Other legislation
Relates to	Hull and Leven Canal Act 1805

Status: Current legislation

Mrs Charlotta Bethell, a widow who owned large amounts of land in the East Riding of Yorkshire, commissioned William Jessop to make a survey for the canal in 1799. Jessop had previously been the engineer for the Holderness Drainage scheme, whose trustees would need to approve the canal for it to be built. He came back with an estimate of £4,041 to make a canal from the River Hull to the village, but the Drainage Trustees asked Mrs Bethell to obtain a second opinion. She employed James Creasey, whose report agreed with Jessop's, that the canal would not harm the drainage of the area, and with the trustees satisfied, Mrs Bethell obtained an act of Parliament to authorise construction, the Hull and Leven Canal Act 1801 (41 Geo. 3. (U.K.) c. xxxii), on 21 May 1801.

Hull and Leven Canal Act 1805
- Act of Parliament
- Parliament of the United Kingdom
- Long title: An Act for altering and amending an Act, passed in the Forty first Year of His present Majesty, for enabling Charlotta Bethell Widow, to make and maintain a Navigable Canal from the River Hull to Leven Bridge, in the East Riding of the County of York.
- Citation: 45 Geo. 3. c. xliii
- Territorial extent: United Kingdom

Dates
- Royal assent: 5 June 1805
- Commencement: 5 June 1805
Other legislation
Amends	Hull and Leven Canal Act 1801

Status: Current legislation

Text of statute as originally enacted

The canal was opened in 1805, but its cost had exceeded Jessop's estimate, and tolls had to be increased. This was authorised by a second act of Parliament, the Hull and Leven Canal Act 1805 (45 Geo. 3. c. xliii), obtained on 5 June 1805. A lock was constructed at the junction with the River Hull, capable of holding keels which were 64 by 14.8 feet (19.5 by 4.5 m). The lock had three sets of gates, two which acted as a conventional lock when the level of the river was higher than that of the canal, and the third to act as a flood gate when the level was lower. A fourth set of gates was added later, to allow the lock to be uses at all states of the tide. Mrs Bethell's son Richard paid half of the cost of improvements to Hull Bridge, which vessels from Kingston upon Hull had to pass through, on condition that the Driffield Navigation reduced its tolls by 60 per cent, producing a considerable saving on the cost of goods reaching Leven.

The 3.25-mile (5.2 km) long canal was constructed to allow Humber Keels to reach the granaries and warehouses at Canal Head in the village. One of the original two warehouses built at the canal basin in 1825 still remains, though it has been converted into a private residence.

Coal, lime and building materials were imported, while local agricultural produce was sent down the river to Hull.

=== Personnel ===
Not only was the canal fairly unusual in being owned by a woman, but it also had a female lock keeper. Matilda Simpson was the daughter of Thomas Jacques and Jane Taylor born on 7 August 1814, either at Cottingham (1851 and 1881 census), or at Dunswell (1901 census), depending on which census you believe. She married David Simpson on 23 June 1834 in Leven.

On the 1851 census William Simpson is recorded as being the lock keeper of Lock House, Leven, aged 75. Also living at the lock house are his wife, Margaret age 71, son David age 41, and David's wife, the aforementioned Matilda age 35. With children, and other close family members, 12 people resided at the lock house.

It is assumed that David took over as lock-keeper when his father William died on 20 March 1853. However, David and his son, John were drowned in a tragic accident. This was reported in a Beverley Guardian report of 9 November 1872. After David, his son, and his son's wife visited Beverley, David walked back, but the other two caught a train later that day. The night was very stormy and dark, and a small boat used by them as a ferry was moored on the Arram bank. The son's wife did not want to cross in the small boat, but David's son crossed to pick up a large boat. On his attempted return to the other bank with his father they both fell in the rough waters, and died.

=== Decline ===
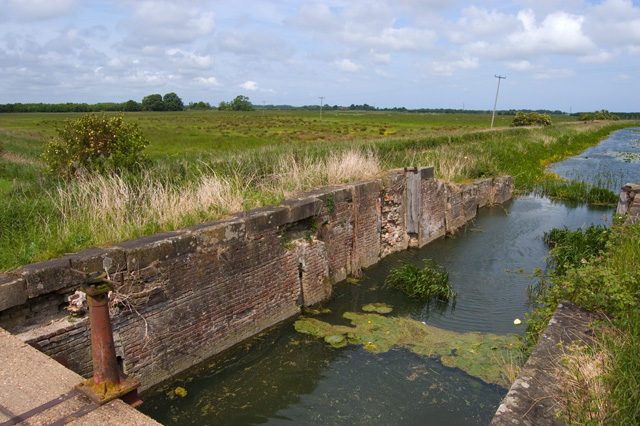
The remains of the entrance lock

The canal was very busy during its life, but traffic started to fall off in the 1930s, and it was officially closed in 1935. Eventually the lock fell into disuse, and Leven Canal became cut off from the river. Subsequently, the lock, which was a flood lock containing three sets of gates, was turned into a sluice, to allow water to pass into the River Hull.

The canal was sold by auction in 1963 and was bought by Frank Hopkinson of Conisbrough for the sum of £1,950. Mr Hopkinson was a motor dealer, who joined the Inland Waterways Association; he died in 1969. It is currently managed by Trailer & Marina (Leven) Ltd.

The waterway was cut in half when it was decided not to maintain the aqueduct over the "Old Sal" or Holderness Drain. The canal bed has been replaced by a pipe over the drain, which is part of the flood defence system of this low-lying area, and about 55 yards (50 m) of canal adjacent to this, under a pipe bridge, has been filled in. The rest of the canal is still in water and has been a Site of Special Scientific Interest since 1962, as it supports around 42 types of plants and animals, including yellow and white water lilies, and this number is larger than for other similar environments. It was the rich flora and fauna that resulted in the High Court upholding a ban on the canal owners from developing the canal for fishing and boating in 2004, although limited improvements have taken place subsequently, as reeds were choking the waterway.

== Route ==
The aqueduct at Sandholme Farm, which carries the canal over a drainage ditch which was already in existence when the canal was built, is largely constructed from red bricks, and has three segmental arches. It is grade II listed.

Point	Coordinates (Links to map resources)	OS Grid Ref	Notes
Junction with River Hull	53.890°N 0.394°W	TA056449	Start of canal
Holderness Drain aqueduct	53.890°N 0.358°W	TA079450	
Leven wharf	53.889°N 0.318°W	TA106449	End of canal

== See also ==
- Canals of Great Britain
- History of the British canal system

== Bibliography ==
- Hadfield, Charles (1973). The Canals of Yorkshire and North East England (Vol 2). David and Charles. ISBN 0-7153-5975-4.
- Priestley, Joseph (1831). "Historical Account of the Navigable Rivers, Canals, and Railways of Great Britain". Longman, Rees, Orme, Brown & Green. Archived from the original on 13 March 2016.
