= Arram Beck =

Stream in the East Riding of Yorkshire, England

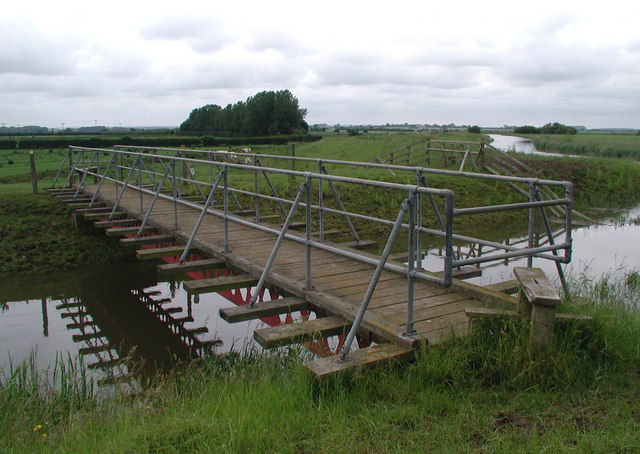
- A bridge over the Beck between the River Hull and the Beverley and Barmston Drain. The River Hull can be seen at the upper right.

Location
- Country: England
- County: East Riding of Yorkshire

Physical characteristics
- Source
  - location: Arram
  - elevation: 0 ft (0 m)
- Mouth
  - location: River Hull
  - elevation: 0 ft (0 m)

Arram Beck is a small stream in the East Riding of Yorkshire, England, running through high embankments and flowing eastwards from the village of Arram to join the River Hull. Depths are variable due to the tidal nature of the Hull. It provides habitat for a variety of fish species (including perch, dace, roach) and chub have also been stocked here too.

== History ==
Near to its junction with the River Hull, the Beck crosses over the Beverley and Barmston Drain, which runs to the west of, and parallel to, the Driffield Navigation and the river. It was authorised by the Beverley Barmston Drainage Act, which was passed by parliament in 1798. The tunnel carrying the drain under Arram Beck was one of eleven similar structures made necessary because the drain needed to cross existing waterways. The civil engineer for the project was William Chapman, who had submitted the original plans in 1796.

According to Frederick Reynard, a resident of Sunderlandwick who gave evidence to a Royal Commission on Inland Waterways in 1906, the Beck, which is only about 660 yards (600 m) long, was occasionally used for navigation in the 19th century, but had ceased to be so by 1894.

As part of the Environment Agency flood reduction works, Aike Beck was diverted into it in the 1990s.

== Points of interest ==
Situated on the River Hull

- Next place upstream = Leven Canal
- Next place downstream = Beverley Beck

Point	Coordinates (Links to map resources)	OS Grid Ref	Notes
Source near Arram	53.8821°N 0.4131°W	TA044440	
Junction with River Hull	53.8818°N 0.4079°W	TA047440	
