= Wilfholme Landing =

Coordinates: 53°54′29″N 0°23′4″W

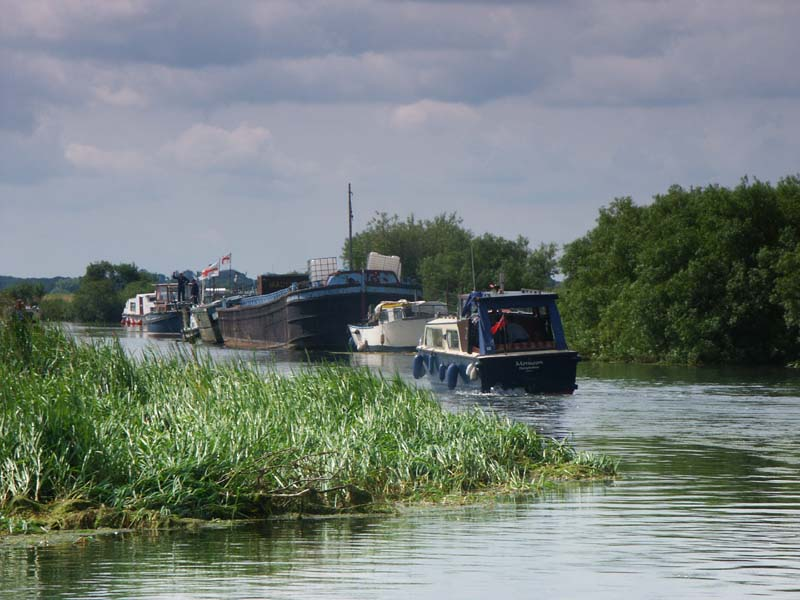
Boat Moorings

Wilfholme Landing is located on the Driffield Navigation in the East Riding of Yorkshire, England. The navigation is still tidal at this point, and is often considered to still be the River Hull, although technically the Navigation starts at the point where the Aike Beck used to join the river, a little further downstream. It is 0.9 miles (1.4 km) from the hamlet of Wilfholme, and its main features are boat moorings, a farm and a pumping station. It is a popular spot for fishing, with anglers targeting resident roach, bream and perch.

== History ==
Immediately to the north of the approach road, Watton Beck enters the river, which is still tidal at this point, as are the first 550 yards (500 m) of the Beck. The Beck crosses over the Beverley and Barmston Drain, which runs to the west of, and parallel to, the Driffield Navigation. It was authorised by the Beverley Barmston Drainage Act, which was passed by parliament in 1798. The tunnel carrying the drain under Watton Beck was one of eleven similar structures made necessary because the drain needed to cross existing waterways. The civil engineer for the project was William Chapman, who had submitted the original plans in 1796.

== Flood defence ==
The operation of the pumping station has been considered as part of a consultation on the River Hull flood risk management strategy. The Environment Agency has identified that the station which pumps water from the Beverley and Barmston Drain into the river costs £80,000 per year to operate. It can pump 161 million gallons per day (734 Mld (megalitres per day)), but is unable to operate when levels in the river are high, and therefore does not meet the current criteria for funding by the government. They had proposed to shut it down in a Catchment Flood Management Plan issued in 2008, even though they had identified that more land would become waterlogged, and more flooding would probably occur. East Riding of Yorkshire Council applied to the High Court for a judicial review, and the plans have been shelved for five years while an alternative solution is sought.

== Location ==
Situated on the Driffield Navigation

- Next place upstream = Struncheon Hill Lock
- Next place downstream = Aike Beck
