= Sculcoates power station =

Former power station in Kingston upon Hull, East Riding of Yorkshire, England

- Country: England
- Location: Kingston upon Hull
- Coordinates: 53°45′49″N 00°20′42″W
- Status: Decommissioned and demolished
- Construction began: 1896
- Commission date: 1898
- Decommission date: 1976
- Owners: Kingston upon Hull Corporation (1898–1948); British Electricity Authority (1948–1955); Central Electricity Authority (1955–1957); Central Electricity Generating Board (1958–1976)
- Operator: As owner

Thermal power station
- Primary fuel: Coal
- Turbine technology: Reciprocating engines and steam turbines
- Cooling towers: 1 concrete Mouchel; 9 timber Davenport
- Cooling source: Cooling towers and drainage channel water

Power generation
- Units operational: 2 x 25 MW, 1 x 30 MW
- Make and model: 25 MW Parsons, 30 MW Parsons, 25 MW GEC
- Units decommissioned: All
- Nameplate capacity: 116 MW
- Annual net output: 343 GWh (1954)

Sculcoates power station supplied electricity to Kingston upon Hull and the wider East Yorkshire area from 1898. An earlier 1893 station in Dagger Lane had operated public lighting in Hull Old Town. Sculcoates power station was built and operated by Kingston upon Hull Corporation on a site in Sculcoates Lane adjacent to the Beverley and Barmston Drain. The power station was increased in size as demand for electricity grew, it was redeveloped several times: including major rebuilds in 1927–29 and in 1938–1952. The power station was closed in 1976 and was subsequently demolished.

== History ==
Hull (Corporation) Electric Lighting Act 1880
- Act of Parliament
- Parliament of the United Kingdom
- Long title: An Act to make further provision for the lighting of the Borough of Kingston-upon-Hull, and to extend the powers of the Mayor, Aldermen, and Burgesses of the Borough in relation to the supply of light by electricity; and for other purposes.
- Citation: 43 & 44 Vict. c. cxxv

Dates
- Royal assent: 2 August 1880

Text of statute as originally enacted

In 1880 Kingston upon Hull Corporation sought a local act of Parliament to allow it, or third parties, to generate and supply electricity for public lighting in the Old Town. This authority was obtained in the Hull (Corporation) Electric Lighting Act 1880 (43 & 44 Vict. c. cxxv). This was only the second such legal authorisation in the United Kingdom following the Liverpool (Corporation) Electric Lighting Act 1879 (42 & 43 Vict. c. ccxiii). A street lighting scheme was built in Hull, however, the lights proved to be unreliable and were discontinued in 1884.

In 1890 Kingston upon Hull Corporation applied for a provisional order under the Electric Lighting Acts to generate and supply electricity to the town. The Kingston-upon-Hull Electric Lighting Order 1890 was granted by the Board of Trade and was confirmed by Parliament through the Electric Lighting Orders (No. 6) Act 1890 (54 & 55 Vict. c. cxci). The Hull Corporation electricity undertaking constructed a power station in 1893 in Dagger Lane. The electricity undertaking initially had 33 consumers, this increased to 271 in 1894 and to 679 in 1898.

To meet increasing demand for electricity a new power station was built in Sculcoates Lane (53°45′48.9″N 0°20′41.7″W) which allowed power to be supplied to west of the Old Town and to the east side of the River Hull. The station was located where the King George Docks railway line crosses the Beverley and Barmston Drain. The railway enabled the delivery of coal to the station and the drainage channel provided cooling water.

== Equipment specification ==
The first Sculcoates plant comprised Willans engines coupled directly to Siemens and Holmes dynamos with an output of 300 kW. There were also Crompton-Howell and Epstein accumulators to maintain current when demand exceeded the generating capacity. In 1898 the generating capacity was 880 kW. There were calculated to be 43,534 lamps of 8 candle power.

By 1913 there were 18 reciprocating engines, but that year a new turbine house was erected containing two 2,000 kW and a boiler house with two 30,000 Ib Clarke Chapman boilers. In 1917, a 5,000 kW Dick Kerr-English Electric set and two more Clarke Chapman boilers were commissioned.

=== Post-war plant ===
Following the First World War new plant was installed to meet growing demand for electricity. By 1923 the plant comprised:

- Coal-fired boilers generating a maximum of 434,000 lb/h (54.7 kg/s) of steam, these supplied steam to:
- Generators
  - 2 × 45 kW reciprocating engines
  - 1 × 180 kW reciprocating engine
  - 2 × 200 kW reciprocating engines
  - 4 × 460 kW reciprocating engines
  - 7 × 500 kW reciprocating engines
  - 2 × 2,000 kW steam turbines (AC)
  - 1 × 5,000 kW steam turbine (AC)

These gave a total generating capacity of 6,010 kW of Direct Current, and 9,000 kW of Alternating Current.

Electricity supplies were available to consumers as 220 and 440 Volts DC; and 3-phase, 50 Hz AC at 230 and 450 Volts.

=== New plant 1925–46 ===
New low pressure (LP) generating sets were commissioned in 1925–26 and high pressure (HP) sets in 1927–46.

- Boilers
  - 3 × Clarke-Chapman 187,500 lb/h (23.62 kg/s), steam conditions 400 psi and 825°F (27.6 bar, 441 °C), feed water 250 °F (121 °C),
  - 5 × Clarke-Chapman 110,000 lb/h (13.86 kg/s), steam conditions 400 psi and 775 °F (27.6 bar, 413 °C), feed water 210 °F (99 °C),
  - 2 × Clarke-Chapman 200,000 lb/h (25.2 kg/s), steam conditions 400 psi and 825°F (27.6 bar, 441 °C), feed water 300 °F (149 °C),

The boilers had a total evaporative capacity of 1,492,500 lb/h (188 kg/s), the boilers supplied steam to:

- Turbo-alternators:
  - 2 × 7 MW Brush-Ljungstrom, 6.6 kV (1926)
  - 1 × 5 MW Brush-Ljungstrom, 6.6 kV
  - 2 × 12.5 MW Brush-Ljungstrom, 6.6 kV (1928)
  - 2 × 25 MW Parsons, 6.6 kV (1935)
  - 1 × 30 MW Parsons, 22 kV (1938)
  - 1 × 30 MW GEC, 6.6 kV (1946)

The total installed generating capacity was 122 MW.

Cooling water was abstracted from the adjacent Beverley and Barmston Drain. There was one 2.5 million gallons per hour (3.16 m^{3}/s) Mouchel concrete cooling tower. There were also 9 Davenport timber towers with a capacity of 3.24 million gallons per hour (4.09 m^{3}/s). The total cooling water flowrate was 5.7 million gallons per hour (7.2 m^{3}/s). The concrete cooling tower was located north of the railway line; a map of 1928 show five rows of ‘tanks’ and marked ‘cooling towers’, and ‘sluices’ on the drainage channel. A 1950 aerial photograph shows the Davenport towers were south of the railway.

Coal was delivered to the site via dedicated sidings connected to the adjacent King George Dock line.

== Operations ==
In 1898 maximum electricity demand was 687 kW, there were 679 customers, and the undertaking sold 467.352 MWh of electricity.

The extension of the undertaking in 1911 entailed the expenditure of £99,322. This was broken down as follows:

- Buildings £19,808
- Machinery £37,297
- Extensions to mains £20,188
- High-tension mains £14,243
- Motors for rental £4,996

This scheme was financed by a 17-year loan.

The operating data for 1921–23 is shown in the table:

Sculcoates power station operating data 1921–23
Electricity Use	Units	Year		
Electricity Use	Units	1921	1922	1923
Lighting and domestic use	MWh	3,302	3,425	3,969
Public lighting use	MWh	85	109	122
Power use	MWh	19,838	26,183	34,904
Total use	MWh	23,226	29,717	38,996
Load and connected load
Maximum load	kW	13,040	15,630	16,980
Total connections	kW	43,278	44,622	47,718
Load factor	%	27.9	27.8	32.2
Financial
Revenue from sales of current	£	–	298,479	311,478
Surplus of revenue over expenses	£	–	88,937	152,940

It was noted in the inter-war period that all the streets in many prosperous Southern towns and in some Northern towns such as Birkenhead, Derby and Hull had been wired for electricity.

To meet increasing demands for electricity the supply area served by Sculcoates power station was expanded. The area of supply encompassed Sutton (by the Kingston-upon-Hull Electric Lighting (Extension) Order 1914), Hessle (by the Kingston-upon-Hull Electric Lighting (Extension) Order 1915), Sculcoates Rural District (by the Kingston-upon-Hull Electricity (Extension) Special Order 1922), and Beverley, Hedon, and Cottingham, and parts of Patrington, Sculcoates, and Skirlaugh rural districts (by the Kingston-upon-Hull Electricity (Extension, etc.) Special Order 1929). In 1932 there were nearly 49,000 consumers, rising to 95,000 in 1946. The supply area was over 160 square miles (414 km^{2}).

Under the terms of the Electricity (Supply) Act 1926 (16 & 17 Geo. 5. c. 51) the Central Electricity Board (CEB) was established in 1926. The CEB identified high efficiency ‘selected’ power station that would supply electricity most effectively; Sculcoates was designated a selected station. The CEB also constructed the national grid (1927–33) to connect power stations within a region. Bulk supplies were sold to the South East Yorkshire Light and Power Company, which supplied a large part of the East Riding. The Central Electricity Board took bulk supplies from the Sculcoates station: in 1939 almost one quarter of the units generated was sold to the Board.

=== Operating data for 1946 ===
Sculcoates power station operating data in 1946 was as follows:

Sculcoates power station operating data, 1946
Year	Load factor per cent	Max output load MW	Electricity supplied GWh	Thermal efficiency per cent
1946	40.3	109.66	386.775	20.03

Upon nationalisation of the British electricity supply industry in 1948 under the provisions of the Electricity Act 1947 (10 & 11 Geo. 6. c. 54) the Sculcoates electricity undertaking was abolished. Ownership of Sculcoates power station was vested in the British Electricity Authority, and subsequently the Central Electricity Authority and the Central Electricity Generating Board (CEGB). At the same time the electricity distribution and sales responsibilities of the Sculcoates electricity undertaking were transferred to the Yorkshire Electricity Board (YEB).

=== Operating data for 1954–71 ===
Operating data for the period 1954–71 is shown in the table:

Sculcoates power station operating data, 1954–71
Year	Running hours (load factor per cent)	Max output capacity MW	Electricity supplied GWh	Thermal efficiency per cent
1954	8602	116	343.458	20.74
1955	8274	116	341.965	21.16
1956	8097	116	316.915	20.72
1957	7655	116	304.926	20.54
1958	6892	116	282.476	20.01
1961	(15.7 %)	116	159.433	19.74
1962	(22.1 %)	116	224.889	20.05
1963	(25.8 %)	116	262.206	19.73
1967	(27.7 %)	116	281.843	19.05
1971	(25.6 %)	81	182.226	20.59

== Closure ==
Sculcoates power station was decommissioned and disconnected from the national grid on 25 October 1976. The buildings and chimneys were subsequently demolished. The area has been redeveloped as housing.

== See also ==
- Timeline of the UK electricity supply industry
- List of power stations in England
