= Beverley and Barmston Drain =

Drainage canal in East Riding of Yorkshire, England

Coordinates: 53.8531°N 0.3999°W

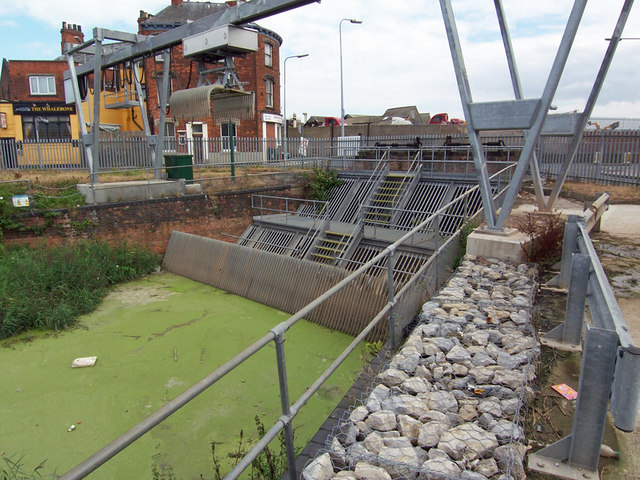
- The outlet of the drain to the River Hull at Wincolmlee
- Interactive map of Beverley and Barmston Drain

Specifications
- Status: operational

History
- Original owner: Beverley and Barmston Drainage
- Principal engineer: William Chapman
- Date of act: 1798

The Beverley and Barmston Drain is the main feature of a land drainage scheme authorised in 1798 to the west of the River Hull in the East Riding of Yorkshire, England. The area consisted of salt marshes to the south and carrs to the north, fed with water from the higher wolds which lay to the north, and from inundation by tidal water passing up the river from the Humber. Some attempts to reduce the flooding by building embankments had been made by the 14th century, and windpumps appeared in the seventeenth century. The Holderness Drainage scheme, which protected the area to the east of the river, was completed in 1772, and attention was then given to resolving flooding of the carrs.

Embanking the River Hull, and carrying water away from the carrs in a lower level channel was suggested by several engineers, but there was opposition to making the scheme really efficient. Some came from the Holderness Drainage, who insisted that any embankments must ensure that land to the west of the river flooded before their own area was threatened, while an outfall to the Humber was resisted by the Port of Hull, who wanted the water to enter the river to sluice silt from its mouth, known as the Old Harbour. The Beverley and Barmston Drainage Act 1798 (38 Geo. 3. c. lxiii) was finally obtained, and work began. Water from the north east of the region was diverted to a new sea outfall at Barmston, and 23 miles (37 km) of drainage cuts were constructed, the main channel running broadly parallel to the river, but following a straighter course.

Although more efficient than the Holderness scheme, flooding remained a problem, because of the restrictions place on the height of embankments. A route for an outfall to the Humber was blocked by numerous roads and railways, an attempt to dredge the Old Harbour in 1864 proved disastrous, and pumping failed, because the water overtopped the low banks further downstream, and re-entered the drain. However, in 1880, agreement was reached with Holderness Drainage, and a joint scheme of dredging the river and raising the banks on both sides of it ensued. Steam pumping stations at Arram Beck, later replaced by one at Wilfholme, and at Hempholme contributed to the success of the land drainage scheme.

More recently, the organisational structure has changed. Henry VIII's Statute of Sewers 1531 (23 Hen. 8. c. 5) was swept away by the Land Drainage Act 1930 (20 & 21 Geo. 5. c. 44), and responsibility passed through six bodies, ending with the Environment Agency in 1995. Local drainage channels were managed by an internal drainage board, and again responsibility has changed as the three internal drainage boards managing the area have gradually merged. Steam pumping was replaced by diesel, and subsequently by electric pumps.

== History ==
In the period after the Romans left Britain, the valley of the River Hull consisted of large areas of marshland, stretching northwards from the Humber almost to Driffield. The marsh was between 2 and 5 miles (3.2 and 8.0 km) wide, and was interspersed with a number of small islands of higher ground. There is no evidence that drainage of the marshes took place during the late Iron Age or Romano British period, but there is plenty of evidence that the islands were inhabited during this time. There is much less evidence for habitation during the Anglo-Saxon period, but by the eleventh century, there were several settlements in the southern salt marshes. Much of the area, however, remained a lake, fed by water from the chalk springs on the edge of wolds to the north, from the Holderness clays, and from inundation by the tide twice a day. Following the Norman conquest, some form of defence against the tides was provided by the construction of earth banks along the Humber and the lower reaches of the River Hull. Ongoing maintenance was a problem, and in 1311 and 1313, King Edward II appointed ad hoc commissioners to repair some of the breaches that had occurred.

While the embankments prevented the tide entering the area, they also prevented the fresh water from the north from leaving it, and drainage channels were cut to channel it to sluices through the main flood banks. Some of the early channels were cut by the monks of Meaux Abbey, but their primary function was probably navigation rather than drainage, since they ran east–west rather than north–south. Land drainage in England became more organised after the passing of the Statute of Sewers in 1532. This established Commissioners of Sewers for the main marshland areas of the country, with powers to inspect banks, to assign the work of maintenance, and to impose fines on those who did not comply. By the early seventeenth century, the salt marshes to the south were generally free from flooding, although in 1646 a severe storm resulted in a breach near Drypool, which resulted in Stoneferry being flooded for 26 weeks. The protection of the salt marshes had been achieved by erecting a large flood bank at Sutton, which prevented water from the carr lands to the north from entering the marshes, but as it then had nowhere to go, the carrs remained waterlogged. Various plans for a new outlet to the south were suggested from the 1660s, but were met with opposition. In 1675, a local landowner called Sir Joseph Ashe cut a drain from Wawne carrs to the Hull, using windmills to pump the water into the Hull, and others followed his example.

A major development began in 1764, when a body of people called Holderness Drainage obtained an act of Parliament, the Holderness Drainage Act 1764 (4 Geo. 3. c. 47 Pr.) which excluded land to the east of the River Hull from the jurisdiction of the Court of Sewers. They employed the engineers John Smeaton and John Grundy, Jr. to advise on a scheme for the Holderness level, and the main Holderness Drain was completed by October 1767. Work continued on building banks and drains until 1772, by which time the works had cost £24,000. The success of the scheme resulted in several areas to the west of the river attempting to improve drainage. Cottingham was the first, obtaining the Cottingham Inclosure Act 1766 (6 Geo. 3. c. 78 Pr.) which allowed them to enclose the land and cut a new drain to join the Hull at Stoneferry. The Beverley and Skidby Drainage Act 1785 (25 Geo. 3. c. 92) was obtained to improve an area below Beverley by cutting a new drain which carried the water to a point further down the Hull. The area had previously been drained to a sluice called Wharton's clow at Cottingham since 1747. Flooding in these two areas had never been as serious as that in the carrs further to the north, and in 1796, the landowners started to consider how this might be remedied.

=== Opposition ===
The outfall for the Holderness Drain had been built on the Hull at Stoneferry, rather than at Marfleet on the Humber, not because it was the best solution, but because of pressure from the Port of Hull. They were keen that the water should be discharged into the Hull so that the scouring effect of fresh water in the river on the Old Harbour would not be reduced. The new scheme faced similar opposition, not only from the Port of Hull, but also from the Holderness Drainage Commissioners, who imposed conditions on any new scheme. Banks on the west side of the river had to be at least 150 feet (46 m) from any banks maintained by the Holderness Drainage, to give the river space to flood, and to reduce the pressure on the existing banks. Any new banks could not exceed the height of the corresponding banks on the eastern side of the river, and there was to be a stretch of 300 yards (270 m) where the new banks were at least 6 inches (15 cm) lower than the lowest banks of the Holderness scheme. This was to ensure that if there was a flood, it would be the west side that flooded, rather than the east. Reluctantly, the landowners accepted these conditions.

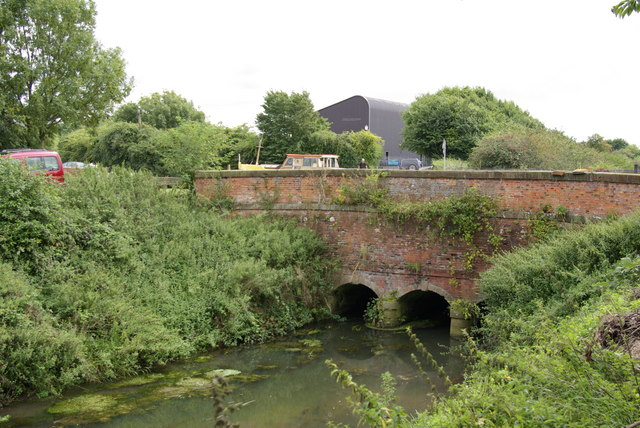
The tunnel carrying the drain under Beverley Beck

Engineers were consulted, and there was general agreement that for a scheme to succeed, the Hull and its tributaries would need to be embanked, and water from the carrs would need to be carried away by a lower level drain, quite separate from the river. Several options for an outfall were proposed, including into the sea at Barmston to the east of Driffield, into the Humber at Dairycotes, or into the Hull near Cottingham clow. Although a dock had been built at Hull in 1778, later to be known as the Old Dock, ships entering it still had to pass through the Old Harbour, and so the same arguments that had prevented a Marfleet outfall for the Holderness scheme were brought to bear on the new scheme. The Dock Company, Hull Trinity House and Hull Corporation combined to exert pressure, even promising to contribute £200 each towards scouring and deepening the Old Harbour, to enable the water to drain more efficiently. Again the landowners succumbed to the pressure, although there is no evidence to suggest that the £600 was ever spent on improvements.

The Beverley and Barmston Drainage Act 1798 (38 Geo. 3. c. lxiii) was finally obtained, and work began. William Chapman, who had produced a report in 1796, was engaged as Chief Engineer, and oversaw the construction of 23 miles (37 km) of drainage cuts, 20 miles (32 km) or embankments to contain the River Hull, and the 2-mile (3.2 km) long Barmston cut. At the southern end, an outfall sluice into the Hull was constructed, and the main channel required 11 tunnels to carry it under existing waterways. 27 road bridges were required, as well as several occupation bridges, together with numerous culverts. The cost of the project by the time it was completed in 1810 was £115,000, and it gave protection to some 12,600 acres (51 km^{2}) of land. The resident engineer for the project was William Settle, and Thomas Dyson was the main contractor for the outfall sluice and the tunnel under Beverley Beck. At the northern end of the Hull valley, various channels were made deeper, and the Barmston cut carried water to the sea at Barmston. A barrier was constructed at Foston on the Wolds to prevent water from north Holderness which had previous drained westwards to the Hull from doing so, and this part of the project was known as Sea End, and became a separate drainage region. The 300 yards (270 m) of lower banks, required to satisfy the Holderness Drainage and known as the overfall, were built near Grovehill, at the southern end of the level.

=== Development ===
The Beverley and Barmston Drain was straighter and larger than the Holderness Drain, and only carried lowland water. It was therefore more efficient at draining the Beverley and Barmston level, but it still did not solve the problem of flooding entirely. One factor was the limits placed on the height of the banks, and in particular the overfall. Another was the difficulties of embanking the tributaries on the Hull, several of which were fed by powerful springs. A third factor was the development of the Driffield Navigation. Its enabling Act specified the maximum water level above the lock at Hempholme, but this was frequently exceeded, resulting in flooding and the surrounding ground becoming waterlogged. Despite the risks, much of the level was ploughed and used to grow crops of barley, oats and wheat, although some of the lowest parts were retained as parture. In common with other drainage schemes, the land levels fell as the peat soils dried out, resulting in increasing difficulties in keeping the carrs free from water. However, opposition from the Port of Hull to making cuts to the Humber waned after 1810, as additional docks were constructed, and the importance of the Old Harbour declined, while a period of agricultural decline from 1815 to 1830 resulted in there being no funds for any improvements to the drainage scheme during this period.

Following this period, the Holderness Drainage were able to build their cut to Marfleet on the Humber with relative ease, as there was only one major road crossing its route, but extending the Beverley and Barmston Drain was much more difficult, as there were several railways and major roads barring the way. The commissioners turned down several proposals for an outlet at Hessle Haven or Dairycotes, each time afraid of the costs of tunnelling under the obstructions. They therefore turned their attention to scouring the Old Harbour, and tried to enlist the support of other authorities, since they felt that such an action would have wider benefits, but none were prepared to assist. They therefore proceeded alone, removing 16,000 tons of silt from the Old Harbour between April and July 1864. There was an initial improvement, but this was short lived, as pressure from adjacent buildings caused silt from below them to move into the new space, resulting in damage to their foundations. The owners claimed compensation, and so the Commissioners lined the bottom of the river with 3 feet (0.9 m) of chalk to prevent further claims.

With few options left, the Commissioners built a steam pumping station at Arram Beck in 1868. This was not successful, as the low banks of the Hull meant that there was little spare capacity, and the pumped water would often return to the drain because of the overfall near Grovehill. Next they suggested to the Holderness Drainage that if they jointly dredged the Hull, they could use the mud to raise the banks on both sides of the river, but the Driffield Navigation objected, and little dredging took place. Finally, the impasse was broken in 1880. The commissioners obtained a new act of Parliament, the Beverley and Barmston Drainage Act 1880 (43 & 44 Vict. c. cxxviii), which allowed them to dredge the river from the Driffield Navigation to the Old Harbour. They had to alter the lock at Hempholme, to allow for the lower water levels, but the restrictions on the height of the banks and the necessity of the overfall, imposed by the 1798 act, were removed. By early 1883, most of the dredging had been done and the banks had been raised. The Arram Beck pumping station, and another at Hempholme, started working, and further south, the new river levels enabled a new steam pumping station to be erected at Dunswell by the Beverley and Skidby Drainage. Regular flooding of the Beverley and Barmston level was effectively ended.

=== Organisation ===
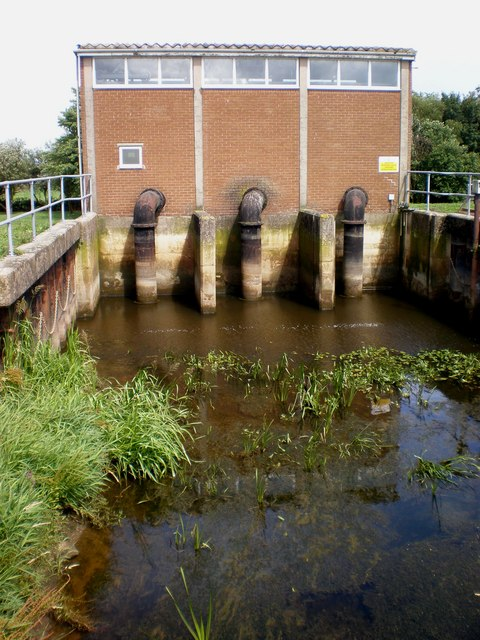
Hempholme pumping station raises water from the low level Roam Drain to the high level Mickley Dike in the foreground

The basis for most land drainage law prior to the 1930s was Henry VIII 's Statute of Sewers (23 Hen. 8. c. 5) of 1531. Subsequent legislation had built upon this, but had not significantly changed it. The Land Drainage Act 1861 (24 & 25 Vict. c. 133) authorised the creation of drainage boards, instead of commissions of sewers, but as time passed, there was increasing pressure to review the basis on which drainage rates were charged, which had not changed since 1531. A royal commission was held in 1927, which concluded that the existing legislation was "vague and ill-defined, full of anomalies, obscure, lacking in uniformity, and even chaotic." Its recommendations formed the basis for the Land Drainage Act 1930 (20 & 21 Geo. 5. c. 44) which established catchment boards, responsible for the main rivers, and internal drainage boards (IDBs), responsible for land drainage at the local level. The River Hull, the Beverley and Barmston Drain and the Holderness Drain all became the responsibility of the Hull Catchment Board, and the smaller channels feeding them were managed by IDBs. Responsibility passed to the Hull and East Yorkshire River Board in 1948, to the Yorkshire Ouse and Hull River Authority in 1965, and to the Yorkshire Water Authority in 1974. After the privatisation of the Water Authorities in 1989, the waterways were managed by the National Rivers Authority, which became part of the Environment Agency in 1995.

Alongside the changes in administrative structure came changes in technology, with steam being replaced first by diesel pumps and then by electric pumping stations. Hempholme steam pumping station had originally been located near to Hempholme weir, but a new station was constructed on Mickley Dike in 1983, slightly further to the east, and the old station was demolished. The station raises water from the low level Roam Drain, which is connected to the Beverley and Barmston Drain by a tunnel under the Driffield Navigation to the north of Hempholme Lock, and discharges it into the high level Mickley Dike, which joins the River Hull below the lock. A diesel pumping station was built at Wilfholme in 1947, when the South Bullock steam pumping station was decommissioned, and that in turn was replaced by electric pumps in 1982. Both pumping stations are managed by the Environment Agency.

Sculcoates power station was built adjacent to the drain in 1898, at the point where the docks railway line crosses the drain. The station used water from the drain via two sluices for condensing and cooling in the power station.

Under the Land Drainage Act 1930, the feeder channels to the Beverley and Barmston Drain were managed by the Beverley and Barmston Internal Drainage Board. There were separate IDBs for Beverley and for Holderness, which subsequently merged, and later merged with the Beverley and Barmston IDB to form the Beverley and North Holderness IDB in 1981. They manage 163 miles (262 km) of drainage channels, which help to safeguard 92 square miles (238 km^{2}) of land from flooding. Around 64 square miles (166 km^{2}) of this relies on pumping for protection.

== Course ==
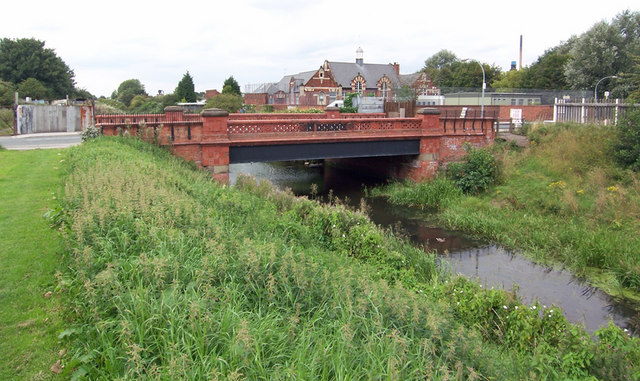
The Grade II Listed bridge over the drain at Lockwood Street

The drain starts at a tunnel beneath the Driffield Navigation, just to the north of Hempholme Lock. To the north, counter drains run on either side of the Navigation, which is much straighter at this point than the old course of the river used to be. Roam Drain joins from the east. The drain heads towards the south west, past the Tophill Low Water Treatment Works, with its "O" and "D" reservoirs, so-called because of their shape. Parts of the works also form the Tophill Low nature reserve, a Site of Special Scientific Interest (SSSI). The river meanders to the east of the works. There is a public right of way along the east bank of the drain. At Wilfholme Landing, it rejoins the river, and passes under Watton Beck in a tunnel. Wilfholme Pumping Station pumps some of the water into the river at this point. The river meanders away again, but the drain continues its straight course towards Aike. The footpath briefly leaves the drain, heading towards Aike village, and rejoins it near the tunnel that once carried the drain under Aike Beck before it was re-routed into Arram Beck and filled in. Near Arram, another tunnel carries it under Arram Beck, and it follows a more southerly direction to reach Hull Bridge at Tickton, where the footpath ends.

The drain crosses Swine Moor, and then turns to the south-east, to pass under Beverley Beck. The structure is variously described as a bridge, aqueduct or tunnel, and is constructed in red brick with ashlar dressings, having three segmental arches. It has been a Grade II Listed structure since 2001. At Woodmansey, the 60-mile (97 km) Wilberforce Way long-distance footpath, created in 2007, briefly follows first the west bank and then the east. In the final section, the drain is separated from the river first by nurseries and farms, and then by housing as it passes through the outskirts of Kingston upon Hull. A Grade II Listed bridge carries Lockwood Street over the drain. It dates from the late nineteenth century, and is constructed of wrought iron, with cast iron balustrades. Shortly afterwards, the drain discharges into the River Hull at a sluice.

== Bibliography ==
- Dobson, Alban; Hull, Hubert (1931). The Land Drainage Act 1930. Oxford University Press.
- Porter, Elizabeth (1978). Water Management in England and Wales. Cambridge University Press. ISBN 978-0-521-21865-8.
- Reid, Ian; Harris, Joy; Walker, Colin (2014). Becks, Banks, Drains and Brains. East Riding of Yorkshire Council (River Hull Valley Drainage Heritage Group). ISBN 978-0-9552912-1-0.
- Sheppard, June A (1976) [1958]. The Draining of the Hull Valley (PDF). East Yorkshire Local History Society. ISBN 0-900349-08-5. Archived (PDF) from the original on 3 November 2014.
- Skempton, Sir Alec; et al. (2002). A Biographical Dictionary of Civil Engineers in Great Britain and Ireland: Vol 1: 1500 to 1830. Thomas Telford. ISBN 978-0-7277-2939-2.
