= Beverley Beck =

Canal in East Riding, England

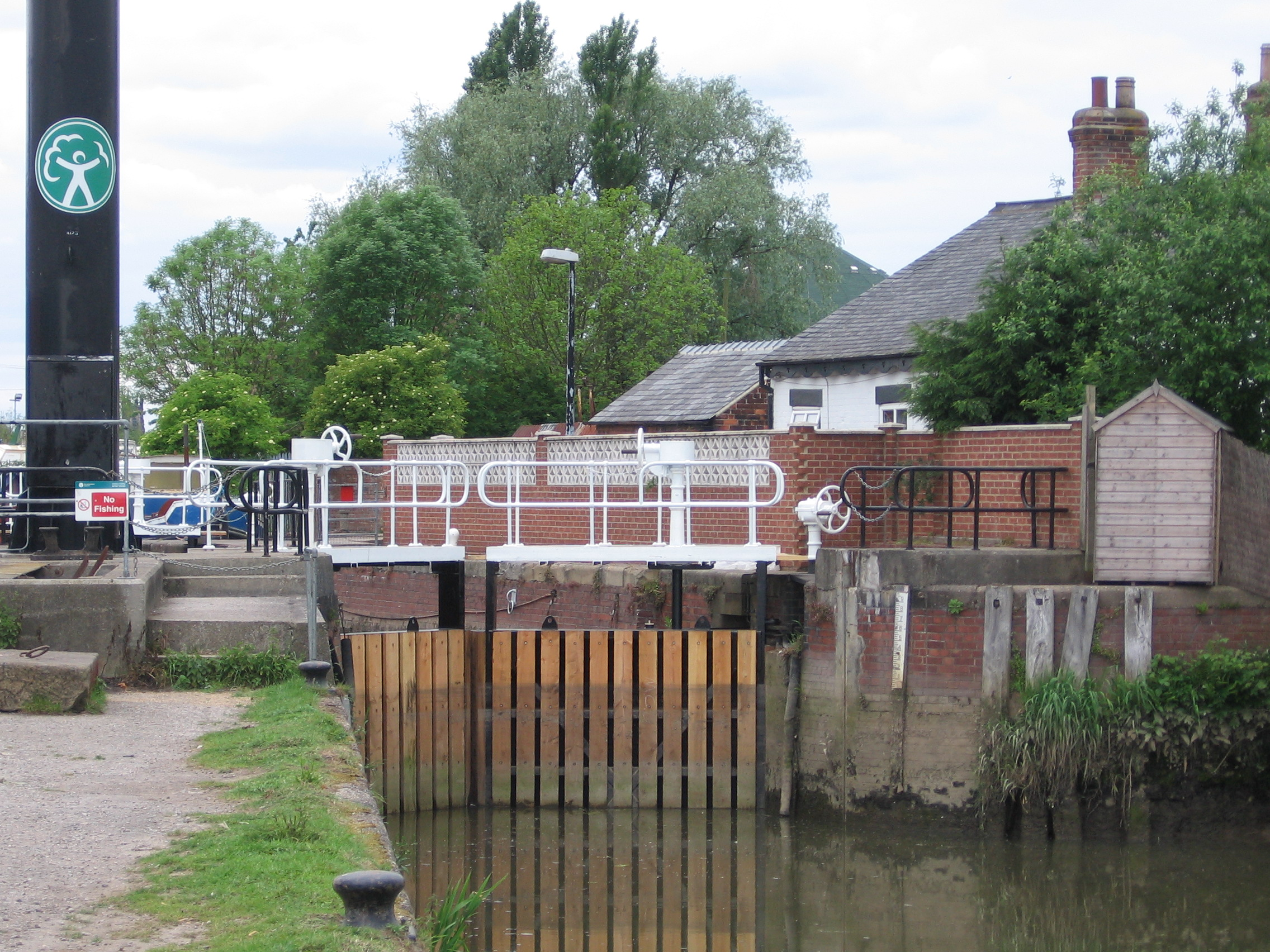
- Grovehill Lock
- Interactive map of Beverley Beck

Specifications
- Length: 0.8 miles (1.3 km)
- Maximum boat length: 65 ft 0 in (19.81 m)
- Maximum boat beam: 17 ft 6 in (5.33 m)
- Locks: 1
- Status: Navigable
- Navigation authority: Beverley District Council

History
- Original owner: Corporation of Beverley
- Date of act: 1726
- Date of first use: 1731

Geography
- Start point: Beverley
- End point: River Hull
- Branch of: River Hull

Beverley Beck is a short canal in the East Riding of Yorkshire, England. The beck runs from Grovehill Lock on the River Hull at Beverley west for about 0.8 miles (1.3 km) into the town of Beverley. Until 1802, the beck was tidal, but the Beverley and Barmston Drain needed to pass under it, and the lock was constructed to maintain water levels over its tunnel. In 1898, a steam engine was installed, which could be used to top up the water levels in the beck by pumping water from the River Hull. A multimillion-pound refurbishment of the area concluded in 2007, with the refurbishment of the lock gates and pumping engine.

== History ==
Beverley Beck was first mentioned in 1296, when the Archbishop of York sought to have fish-weirs removed from the River Hull so that boats could reach Beverley. Grovehill, formerly known as Grevale and located near the junction with the River Hull, was used as a mooring place for barges. The agreement that the archbishop had made with the fish-weir owners was then transferred to the burgesses of the Beverley Corporation, and by 1344 the Beck was navigable as far as Beverley. The first known accounts, for scouring and cleansing of the Beck, date to this year. The corporation assumed that they had a monopoly on the waterway, and leased it to tenants, who then had to provide two boats in which all cargo was carried. This changed to a system of tolls from 1704, which allowed other boats to use the Beck. The wharf at Grovehill was later converted into a lock.

During the 17th century, borough records mention several attempts to improve the Beck by scouring, and also the problems of financing these operations. In 1695, three aldermen and three burgesses were appointed to collect contributions towards the maintenance costs. In the 1720s, John Warburton proposed that a boat fitted with an engine like "those used in Holland and Flanders" should be used to loosen the reeds and silt, and that two locks or floodgates should be used to hold back the water at high tide, and used to flush away the loosened material at low tide. One would be near the Great Bridge, and the second between the Great and Little Bridges. The "engine" mentioned was probably some sort of plough. Contributions towards the estimated cost of £200 were not forthcoming, although the corporation ordered a plough from Holland in January 1721.

The corporation faced a crisis in 1726, as funds were inadequate to cover the cost of repairs to the Beck, and they therefore obtained an act of Parliament, the Beverley Improvement Act 1726 (13 Geo. 1. c. 4), which allowed them to cleanse, widen and deepen the Beck, to repair the wharves and any roads leading to it, and introduced additional tolls. The act was sponsored by Sir Charles Hotham, the Member of Parliament for Beverley, and was granted on 24 March 1727. William Palmer, a civil engineer, advised on the work to the beck, which was completed in 1731 at a cost of £1,395, but resulted in little improvement. A second act of Parliament, the Beverley Improvement Act 1744 (18 Geo. 2. c. 13), was obtained on 19 March 1744, for "more effectually cleansing, deepening, widening, and preserving, a Creek, called Beverley Beck, running into the River Hull, ... and for regulating the carriages to and from the said Beck and the River Hull." One new feature introduced by the act was that the value of the tolls collected depended on the value of the goods carried. Although the corporation continued to carry out maintenance, which consisted mostly of dredging, they let the collection of tolls to an agent from 1 May 1748, and this arrangement continued for another ninety years.

Beverley Beck was tidal, although there seems to have been attempts to maintain the water levels by the use of a stop-gate. A major change occurred in 1802, when the Beverley and Barmston Drain was constructed as part of a large drainage scheme. The drain needed to pass under the Beck, and William Chapman, the engineer for the scheme, advised the Beverley Corporation that the construction of a lock would be the best way to maintain the water levels over the tunnel which would carry the drain below the Beck. After a debate about the legality of using funds raised under the terms of the previous acts of Parliament, and a decision that it was legitimate, Chapman's plans were agreed, and he designed the lock, which was funded by a corporation loan of £1,000. However, Thomas Dyson carried out the work, and was paid £817, a little more than the original estimate of £733. In 1837, the corporation decided to stop leasing the collection of tolls, and appointed William Tindall to collect them directly. Tolls for 1838 amounted to £594, on total cargoes of 31,185 tonnes.

Although Beverley was served by the Hull and Selby Railway from October 1846, the canal remained independent, and therefore competitive for trade to Hull. The competition helped to keep railway tolls lower than they might otherwise have been, and traffic on the Beck continued to grow, rising from 31,185 tons in 1838 to 51,578 tonnes in 1888 and 101,540 tonnes in 1905. However the larger tonnages were not reflected in income, as the powers of the corporation to charge tolls on traffic outside of the municipal boundaries was restricted by the Canals Tolls and Charges, No. 3 (Aberdare, &c. Canals) Order Confirmation Act 1894 (57 & 58 Vict. c. cxcviii), and resulted in them making a loss in 1905. Major expenditure in 1898 included the installation of a steam engine and pump to raise water into the Beck from the River Hull.

Although some keels sailed along the Beck, most were hauled by teams of men. An experiment with a steam launch acting as a tug was tried in 1898, but was not successful. Powered keels arrived soon afterwards. Grovehill Lock was reconstructed in 1958, to take craft up to 65 by 17.5 feet (19.8 by 5.3 m) with a draft of 6.5 feet (2.0 m), at a cost of £30,000. Commercial traffic continued until quite late, with the tolls amounting to £2,365 in 1970, from the carriage of 28,169 tonnes of cargo, consisting mainly of coal and the raw materials for cattle feed.

== Today ==
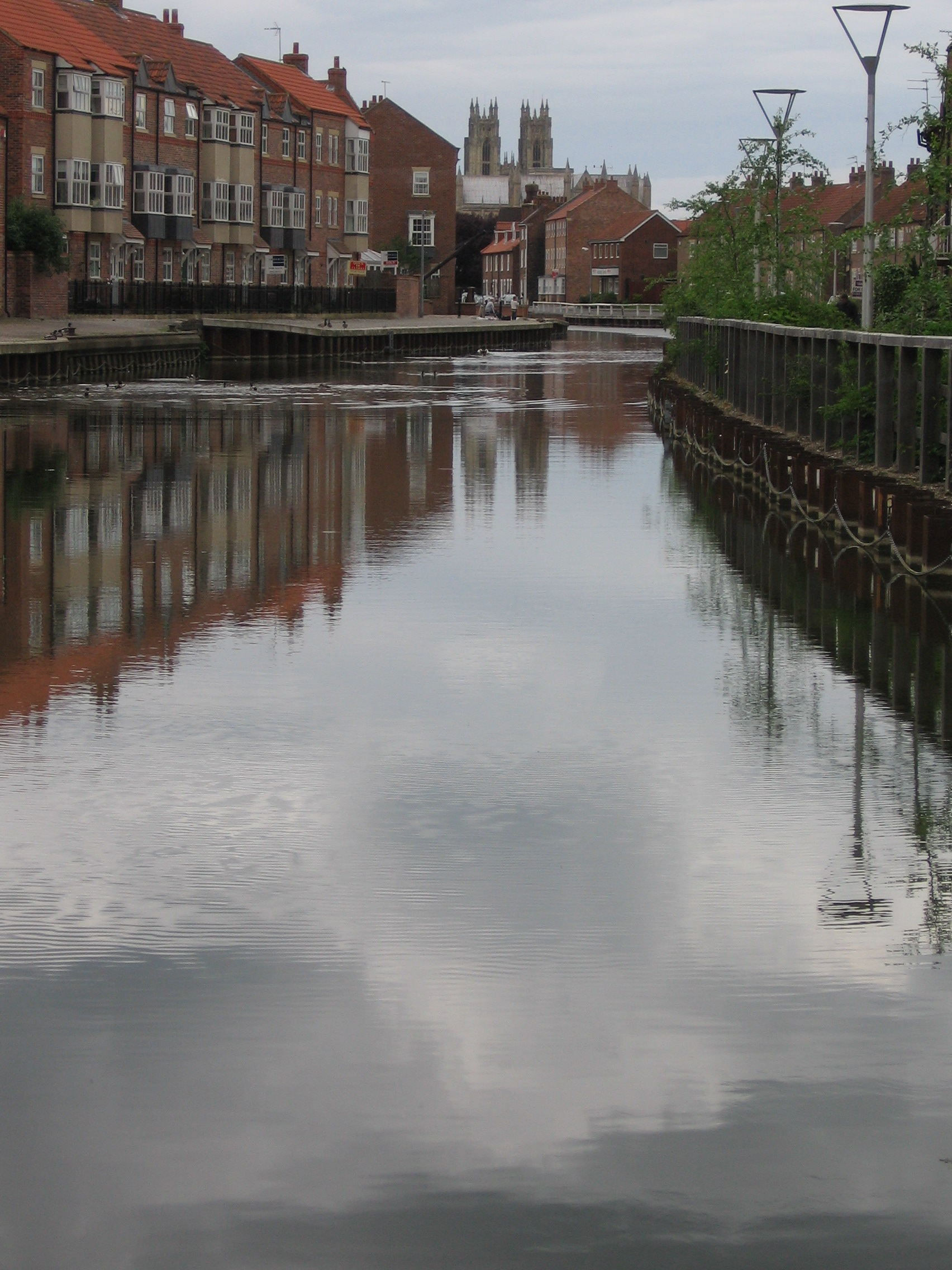
Beverley Beck

Beverley Beck was constructed to enable larger vessels to reach the growing town of Beverley. Now it is home to a good number of leisure boats, as well as the historic barge Syntan owned by the Beverley Barge Preservation Society. The barge was built for Richard Hodgson, who owned a tannery in Beverley, and was based on the Beck from 1949 until the 1970s. After a period spent on the River Don Navigation, the remains were bought by the society in 2001, and were restored during a three-year project. Beverley Beck is popular among fishermen holding good sized pike, as well as bream, dace, eel, gudgeon and tench. It is also the home of the Beverley Beck Boating Association, most of whose members keep boats on the beck.

The Beck has been improved by a major dredging programme, which lasted for five months and was completed in April 2004. Sampling of the sediments before work began revealed high levels of heavy metals and hydrocarbons, as a result of historic industrial processes, and they therefore had to be taken to a hazardous landfill site when they were removed from the Beck. Land and Water, the contractors responsible for the project, developed a special screening plant that enabled the hazardous waste to be separated from non-hazardous sediments, and this was the first time that such a system had been used on an inland waterways contract. In mid-2005, a multimillion-pound scheme to redevelop the Beck and its immediate vicinity began. The final stage, which started in February 2007 and cost £250,000, involved restoration of the lock gates and pumping station, together with the construction of footpaths and cycle routes. The previous set of gates were fitted in 1953.

== Course ==
Situated on the River Hull

- Next place upstream = Arram Beck

Point	Coordinates (Links to map resources)	OS Grid Ref	Notes
Beverley	53.839°N 0.413°W	TA044392	Head of navigation
Grovehill Lock	53.840°N 0.395°W	TA057393	Junction with River Hull

== See also ==
- Canals of the United Kingdom
- History of the British canal system

== Bibliography ==
- Cumberlidge, Jane (2009). Inland Waterways of Great Britain (8th Ed.). Imray Norie Laurie and Wilson. ISBN 978-1-84623-010-3.
- Duckham, Baron F. (1973). The Inland Waterways of East Yorkshire 1700-1900 (PDF). East Yorkshire Local History Society. ISBN 978-0-900349-29-4. Archived from the original (PDF) on 22 March 2012.
- Frost, Charles (1827). Notices Relative to the Early History of the Town and Port of Hull. J. B. Nichols.
- Hadfield, Charles (1972). The Canals of Yorkshire and North East England (Vol 1). David and Charles. ISBN 978-0-7153-5719-4.
- Hadfield, Charles (1973). The Canals of Yorkshire and North East England (Vol 2). David and Charles. ISBN 978-0-7153-5975-4.
- Jackson, W. Turrentine; Chaloner, W. H. (1962). The Development of Transportation in Modern England. Routledge. OCLC 1158344658.
- Priestley, Joseph (1831). "Historical Account of the Navigable Rivers, Canals, and Railways of Great Britain". Longman, Green. Archived from the original on 12 March 2016.
- Skempton, Sir Alec; et al. (2002). A Biographical Dictionary of Civil Engineers in Great Britain and Ireland. Thomas Telford. ISBN 978-0-7277-2939-2.
