= Aike =

Village in the East Riding of Yorkshire, England

Coordinates: 53.898519°N 0.404197°W

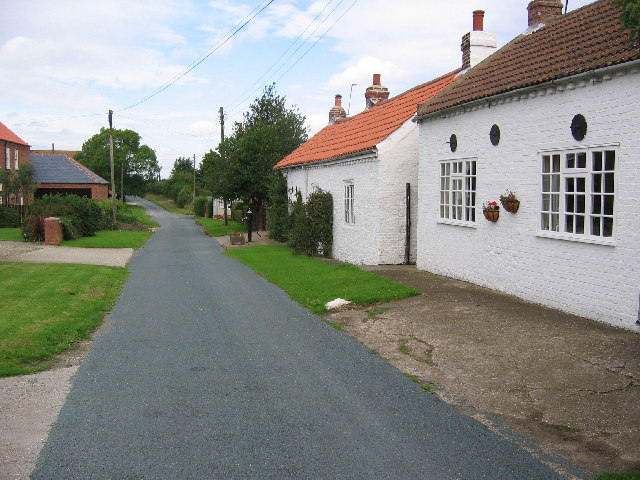
- Aike village

- Location within the East Riding of Yorkshire
- OS grid reference: TA049458
  - London: 165 mi (266 km) S
- Civil parish: Lockington
- Unitary authority: East Riding of Yorkshire
- Ceremonial county: East Riding of Yorkshire
- Region: Yorkshire and the Humber
- Country: England
- Sovereign state: United Kingdom
- Post town: DRIFFIELD
- Postcode district: YO25
- Dialling code: 01377
- Police: Humberside
- Fire: Humberside
- Ambulance: Yorkshire
- UK Parliament: Beverley and Holderness

Aike (/jæk/) is a hamlet and former civil parish, now in the parish of Lockington, in the East Riding of Yorkshire, England. The hamlet is centred around a single developed street, which lies to the east of the Yorkshire Wolds. Aike is approximately 4 miles (6 km) north of Beverley and approximately 0.4 miles (1 km) from the west bank of the River Hull. It is approached by a 2.5-mile (4 km) lane which is a no-through road that does not continue beyond the village, although a farm track continues as far as a bridge across the Beverley and Barmston Drain. In 1931 the parish had a population of 48.

== History and toponymy ==
Toponymy

The village name means "oak". In the local dialect, the name was not rounded to be recorded as oak or oake unlike equivalents — it remained the Old English āc. The name is sometimes pronounced "Yack".

Civil and ecclesiastical parish of the hamlet

Aike was formerly a township in the parishes of Lockington and St. John Beverley, from 1866 Aike was a civil parish in its own right, on 1 April 1935 the parish was abolished and merged with Lockington. Lockington is the ecclesiastical parish of Lockington and Aike anyway because of St Mary's Church in Lockington, which lies 1.5 miles (2.4 km) further west of the hamlet. In traditional definitions and histories of the county, Aike is a hamlet falling short of a chapelry as it has never had a Church of England chapel/church; however the term hamlet is becoming defunct.

Former status as an island

The land around Aike is too low-lying to drain into the nearby River Hull. Before construction began on the Beverley and Barmston Drain in 1798, Aike's cluster of central houses were on a small island.

== Economy and landmarks ==
Aike Grange Stud is a dressage park, and hosts regional competitions. Eighteenth-century "Sunnyside" or "Sunnyside cottage" is a brick-built, colour-washed house with a pantile roof and sash windows, designated the area's sole grade II listed building. It was listed in 1987.

== Notable people ==
The Olympic bronze medal-winning dressage rider Charlotte Fry grew up in Aike.
