= Wilfholme =

Hamlet in the East Riding of Yorkshire, England

Coordinates: 53.916974°N 0.402884°W

- Location within the East Riding of Yorkshire
- OS grid reference: TA049479
  - London: 170 mi (270 km) S
- Civil parish: Beswick
- Unitary authority: East Riding of Yorkshire
- Ceremonial county: East Riding of Yorkshire
- Region: Yorkshire and the Humber
- Country: England
- Sovereign state: United Kingdom
- Post town: DRIFFIELD
- Postcode district: YO25
- Dialling code: 01377
- Police: Humberside
- Fire: Humberside
- Ambulance: Yorkshire
- UK Parliament: Beverley and Holderness

Wilfholme is a hamlet in the East Riding of Yorkshire, England. It forms part of the civil parish of Beswick, and is situated just east from the A164 road, approximately 5 miles (8 km) north from Beverley and 6 miles (10 km) south from Driffield. Wilfholme Landing is 0.9 miles (1.4 km) to the south-east and provides access to the Driffield Navigation.

A nine-year-old dressage horse, Faldo, trained for nine months at Wilfholme, was bought in 2010 by the production company for Steven Spielberg's film War Horse to play one of the film's two horses in the role of Topthorn.

In 2010 local farmers expressed concern at the Environment Agency's possible decision to stop maintaining water pumping stations and flood banks at Wilfholme, Tickton and Hempholme, which they felt would increase the risk of flooding to arable and urban areas. In 2009 the Agency had reverted plans to end this maintenance, a decision supported by local Beverley and Holderness MP Graham Stuart.

== See also ==
- Listed buildings in Beswick, East Riding of Yorkshire

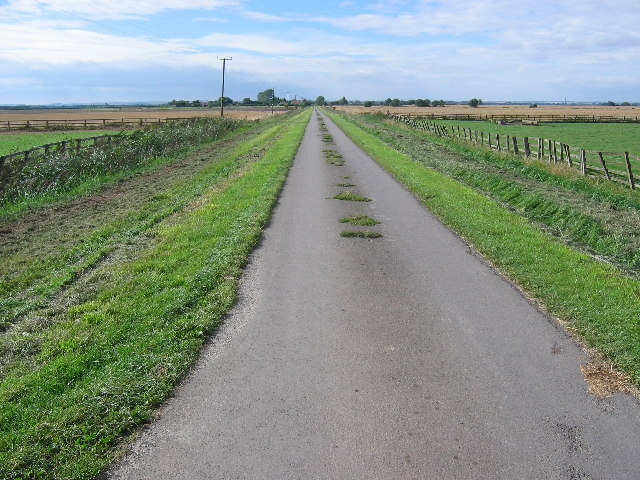
The road from Wilfholme Landing
