= Arram =

Village in the East Riding of Yorkshire, England

Coordinates: 53.883097°N 0.417306°W

- Location within the East Riding of Yorkshire
- OS grid reference: TA041441
  - London: 165 mi (266 km) S
- Civil parish: Leconfield
- Unitary authority: East Riding of Yorkshire
- Ceremonial county: East Riding of Yorkshire
- Region: Yorkshire and the Humber
- Country: England
- Sovereign state: United Kingdom
- Post town: BEVERLEY
- Postcode district: HU17
- Dialling code: 01964
- Police: Humberside
- Fire: Humberside
- Ambulance: Yorkshire
- UK Parliament: Beverley and Holderness

Arram is a small (population 200) farming village in the East Riding of Yorkshire, England. It is situated approximately 3 miles (5 km) north of the market town of Beverley and 1.5 miles (2.4 km) east of Leconfield.

It forms part of the civil parish of Leconfield.

The main features are a small railway station on the Yorkshire Coast Line, proximity to RAF Leconfield and a red phonebox.

The village has a fishing venue on the tidal River Hull.

The road from Leconfield is one continuous corner due to being moved in the 1970s to accommodate the lengthening of the runway for Vulcan Bombers.

The Beverley Minster Way Walk goes through Arram.

== Image gallery ==
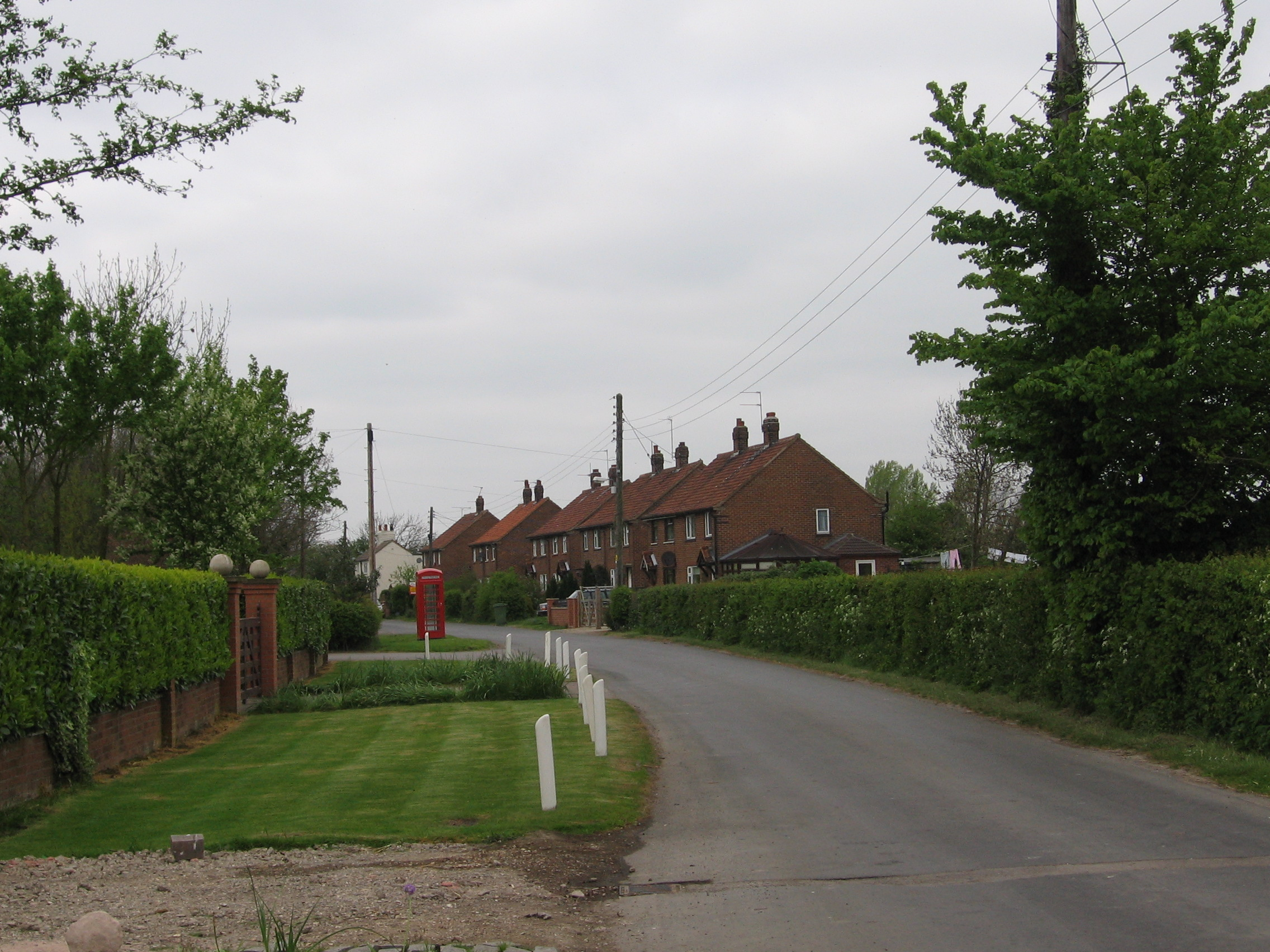
Arram village

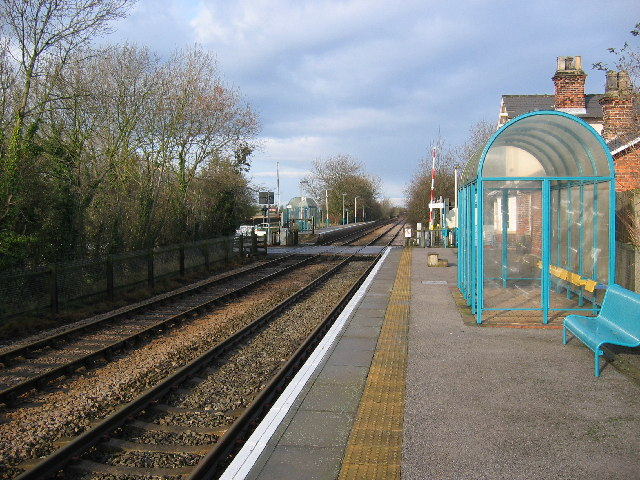
Arram railway station

== Bibliography ==
- Gazetteer — A–Z of Towns Villages and Hamlets. East Riding of Yorkshire Council. 2006. p. 3.
