= William Chapman (engineer) =

English engineer

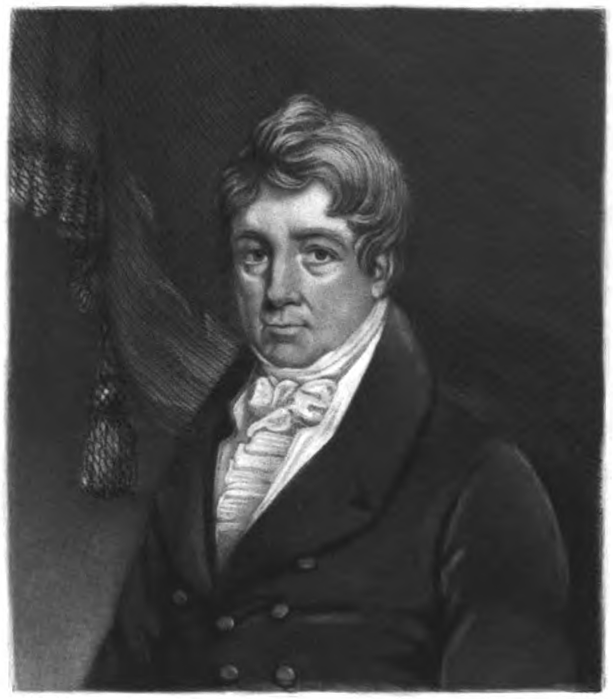
- Born: 7 March 1749; Whitby, Yorkshire
- Died: 29 May 1832 (aged 83); Newcastle-upon-Tyne
- Occupation: Engineer
- Known for: Land drainage, Harbour works, Design of oblique bridges
- Notable work: Grand Canal of Ireland, Humber Dock at Hull, East London Dock

William Chapman (1749–1832) was an English engineer. Born in Whitby, he worked on the construction of the Old and Humber Docks in Hull, as well as many drainage and canal projects. He is credited with the invention of the bogie and articulation (see Articulated vehicle) for rail vehicles.

== Personal life ==
William Chapman was born on 7 March 1749 in Whitby. His father, Captain William Chapman, already had three daughters from his first marriage, but William was the first of ten children born to his second wife, Hannah Baynes. He left home in 1765, moving to Barnes, Sunderland, and then to Newcastle. Two years later, he joined the Merchant Navy, and was able to enrol in the Guild of Master Mariners in 1769. Next he set up as a merchant and coal fitter, and with his brother, took out a lease on collieries at St. Anthony's and Wallsend in 1778. Despite initial success, the project ran into financial difficulties, and both men were declared bankrupt in 1782. The failure did not deter him, and he worked first as a mechanical engineer and then as a civil engineer. Although he lived in Ireland, near York and at Morton in County Durham at various times, he maintained an office and a house in Newcastle. He was active in his profession until shortly before his death, on 29 May 1832. His burial was at St Andrew's Church in Newcastle. His large library, which ran to 535 volumes, was auctioned the following year, but his widow Elizabeth donated his printed reports to the Institution of Civil Engineers in 1837.

== Works ==
=== Skew bridges ===
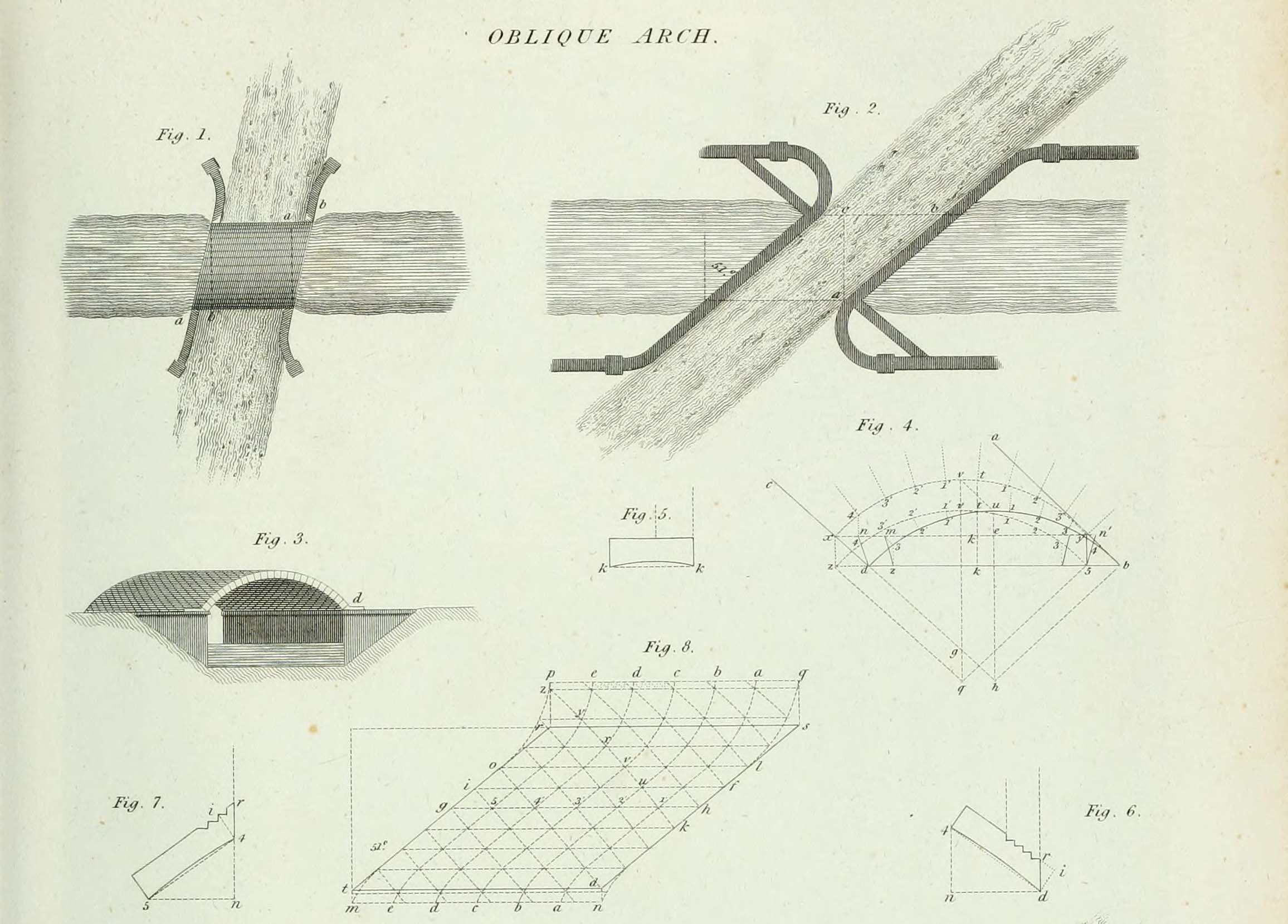
Finlay Bridge on the Kildare Canal, from Rees' Cyclopaedia, 1820

Chapman is important for his work on the theoretical design of skew bridges, as he developed the first methodical technique for their design. This was his 'spiral method', as described in Rees's Cyclopædia. It was based on work he had done for the Kildare Canal in Ireland in 1787. In this, the arch is considered as a series of arch slices, parallel to the arch faces and at an angle to the abutments. The arch soffit (the curved underside) is drawn out into a flat plane, a parallelogram grid drawn on this, and then these diagonal lines (each one representing an arch slice) transferred to the centring of the constructed arch. This method had been applied to the design of Finlay Bridge at Naas, employing an arch barrel based on a circular segment that is smaller than a semicircle. This method would later be described in standard texts on railway masonry, such as Nicholson.

=== Land drainage ===
Chapman was engineer for the Beverley and Barmston Drainage (1799–1810) which gave drainage and flood protection to 12,600 acres between Beverley and Lisset, in East Yorkshire, and for the Muston and Yeddingham scheme (1800–1808). This involved a Sea Cut from the River Derwent (Vale of Pickering), which diverted flood water to the sea via Scalby Beck, just north of Scarborough.

=== Harbours ===
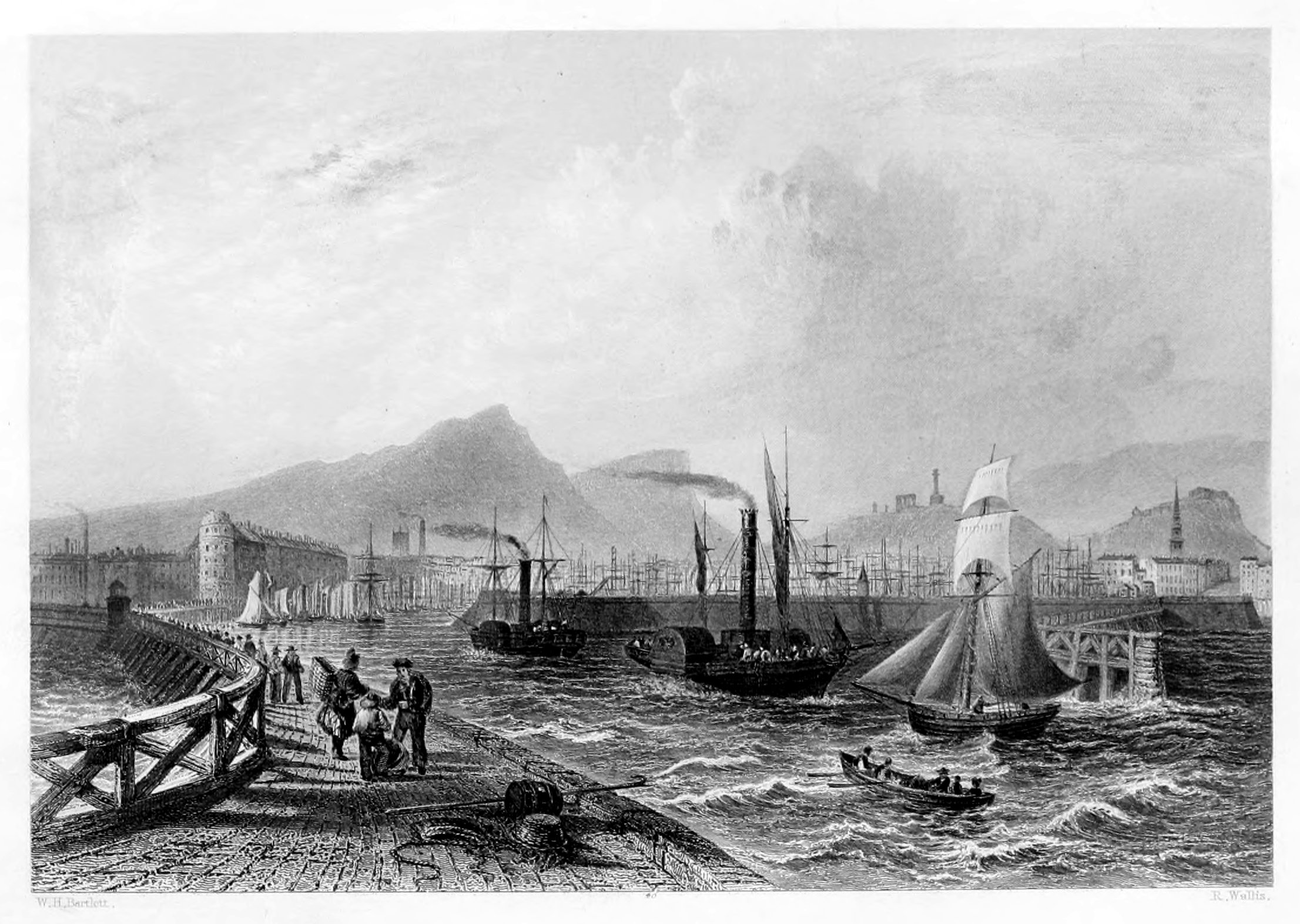
Leith Harbour – View from the East Pier, 1840

At Scarborough, North Yorkshire, between 1801 and 1831, Chapman extended the East Pier and Vincent's pier and built the West Pier, all in massive masonry. The harbour as it exists today is essentially Chapman's work. At Leith (1826–31), Chapman built the Eastern pier and the Western breakwater. These provided a safe approach to the old inner harbour Seaham in County Durham was his largest harbour project, with two piers, a north basin excavated from the solid rock (which provided building material for the piers) and a south harbour. By 1845 more than 700,000 tons of coal a year were being shipped from Seaham. Two other major dock projects were collaborations: with John Rennie at Hull; and with Daniel Alexander at the East London Dock.

=== Navigation ===
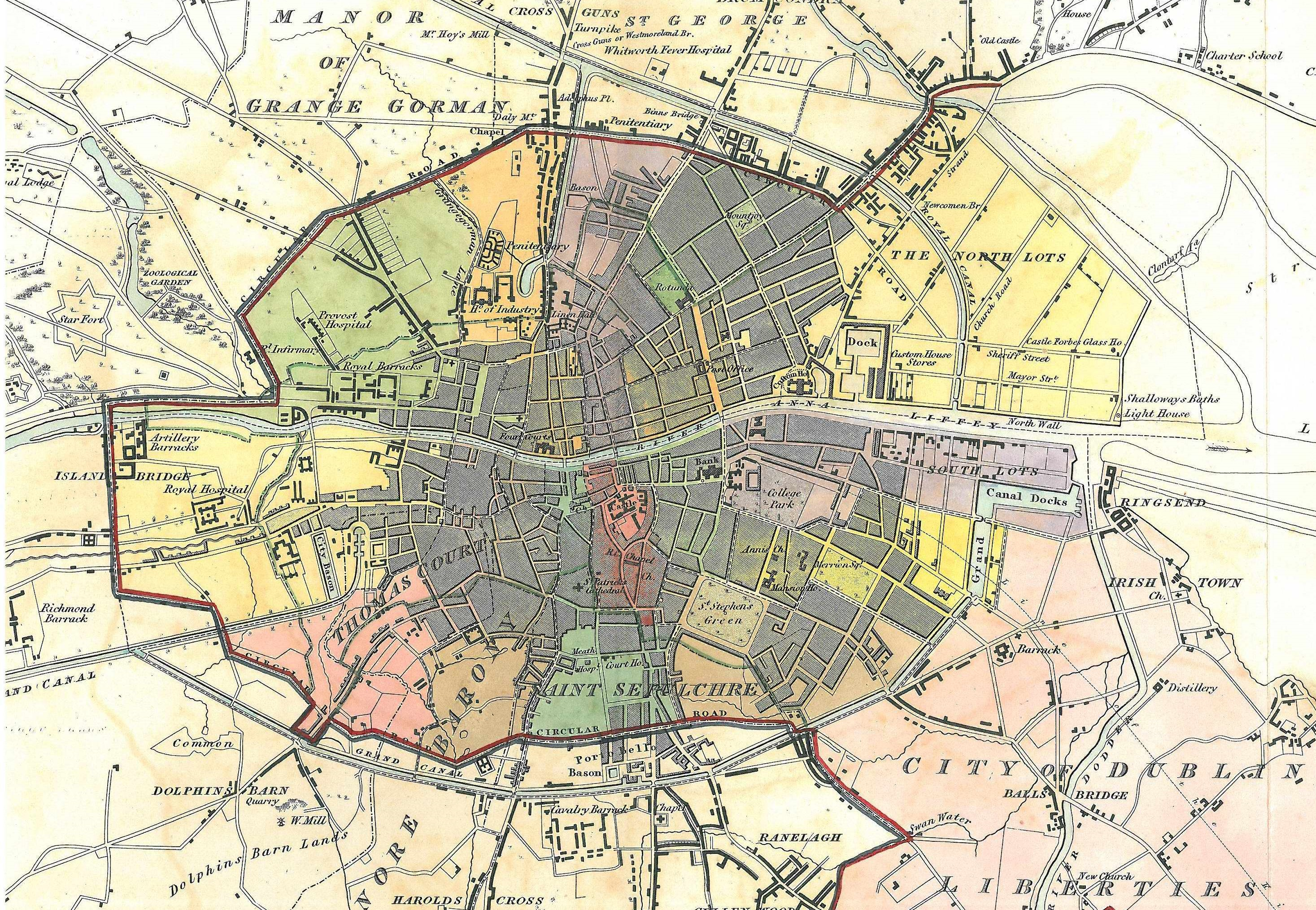
Map of the City of Dublin in 1837 showing the route of the Grand Canal around the south of the city.

Chapman worked on a number of canal and river navigation schemes. On the River Shannon he rebuilt the locks on the lower section of the river between Killaloe and Limerick between 1791 and 1794. For the River Orwell (1806–1808) the works included several new cuts, and also the deepening of the river channel using a steam dredger – the first time a steam dredger had been used for this purpose. Chapman was consulting engineer on the Grand Canal (Ireland), and proposed the semi-circular route of the canal around the south side of Dublin, joining the River Liffey to the east of the city. This section of the canal was built between 1790 – 1792.
