= River Hull =

River in the East Riding of Yorkshire, England

- The tidal barrier and the Millennium Bridge at the mouth of the river

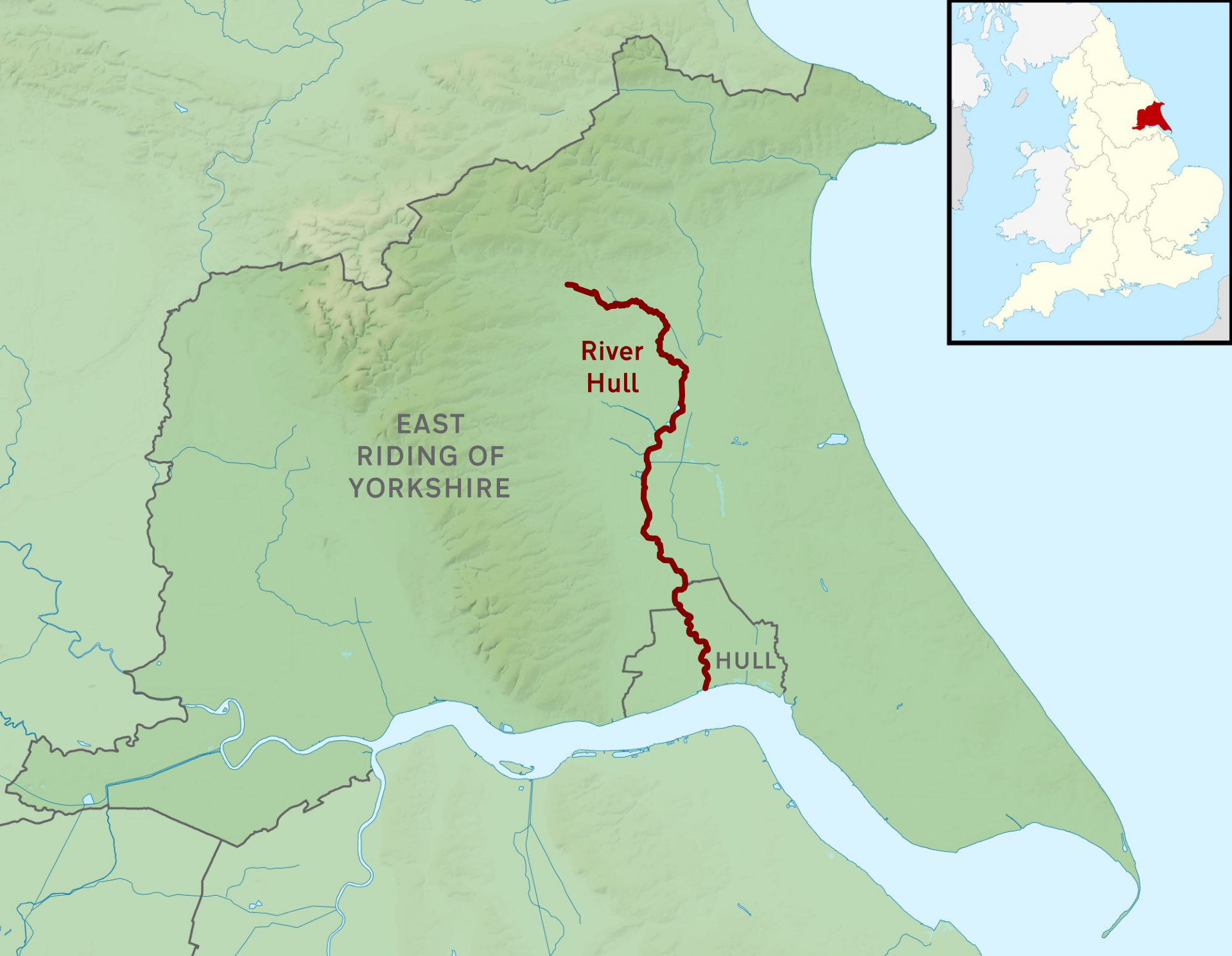
- Course of the river within the East Riding of Yorkshire

Location
- Country: England
- County: East Riding of Yorkshire

Physical characteristics
- Source
  - location: Driffield
  - elevation: 65 ft (20 m)
- Mouth: Humber Estuary
  - location: Kingston upon Hull
  - coordinates: 53°44′20.17″N 0°19′52.3″W
  - elevation: 0 ft (0 m)
- Discharge
  - location: Hempholme Lock
  - average: 3.4 m^{3}/s (120 cu ft/s)

The River Hull is a navigable river in the East Riding of Yorkshire in Northern England. It rises from a series of springs to the west of Driffield, and enters the Humber Estuary at Kingston upon Hull. Following a period when the Archbishops of York charged tolls for its use, it became a free navigation. The upper reaches became part of the Driffield Navigation from 1770, after which they were again subject to tolls, and the section within the city of Hull came under the jurisdiction of the Port of Hull, with the same result.

Most of its course is through low-lying land that is at or just above sea level, and regular flooding has been a long-standing problem along the waterway. Drainage schemes to alleviate it were constructed on both sides of the river. The Holderness Drainage scheme to the east was completed in 1772, with a second phase in 1805, and the Beverley and Barmston Drain to the west was completed in 1810. Since 1980, the mouth of the river has been protected by a tidal barrier at the estuary, which can be closed to prevent tidal surges entering the river system and causing flooding upriver.

Most of the bridges which cross the river are movable, to allow shipping to pass. There are six swing bridges; four bascule bridges, two of which have twin leaves, one for each carriageway of the roads which they carry; and three Scherzer rolling lift bascule bridges. The former Scott Street Bridge (taken out of use 1994 and dismantled 2020) was originally powered from a high pressure water main maintained by the first public power distribution company in the world.

== Etymology ==
The name Hull is probably of Brittonic origin. The name may derive from *hūl, an element related to *hū- meaning "boil, soak, seethe" (< Old Celtic *seu-; cf. River Sill in Europe). However, Andrew Breeze has argued that the river-name was a back-formation from a settlement name derived from Old English hula ("sheds, huts").

== Course ==
The source of the River Hull is in the Yorkshire Wolds. It rises from a series of springs to the west of Driffield, near the site of the medieval village of Elmswell. The Elmswell Beck flows eastwards from these, and is joined by the Little Driffield Beck, which flows southwards from Little Driffield. It continues as the Driffield Beck, flowing around the south-western edge of Driffield, where it is joined by the Driffield Trout Stream. After the junction, it becomes the River Hull or the West Beck and flows to the east, before turning south to reach Corps Landing. For much of the route below Driffield, the Driffield Navigation runs parallel to the river.

The river from Corps Landing to its mouth is navigable. At Emmotland, it is joined by the Frodingham Beck, which is also navigable, and leads to the canal into Driffield, which forms the major part of the Driffield Navigation. Scurf Dyke joins from the west and is followed by Struncheon Hill lock, which marks the end of the Navigation, and the official start of the navigable River Hull. Below here, the river is tidal. The tidal range of tides can be up to 7 feet (2.1 m) in winter and 4 feet (1.2 m) in summer. Just above the lock, the Beverley and Barmston Drain, which collects water from the catchwater drains on either side of the main channel, flows under the navigation in a tunnel, and runs just to the west of the river almost to its mouth. Below the lock, the surrounding land is almost at sea level, and the river is constrained by flood banks on both sides.

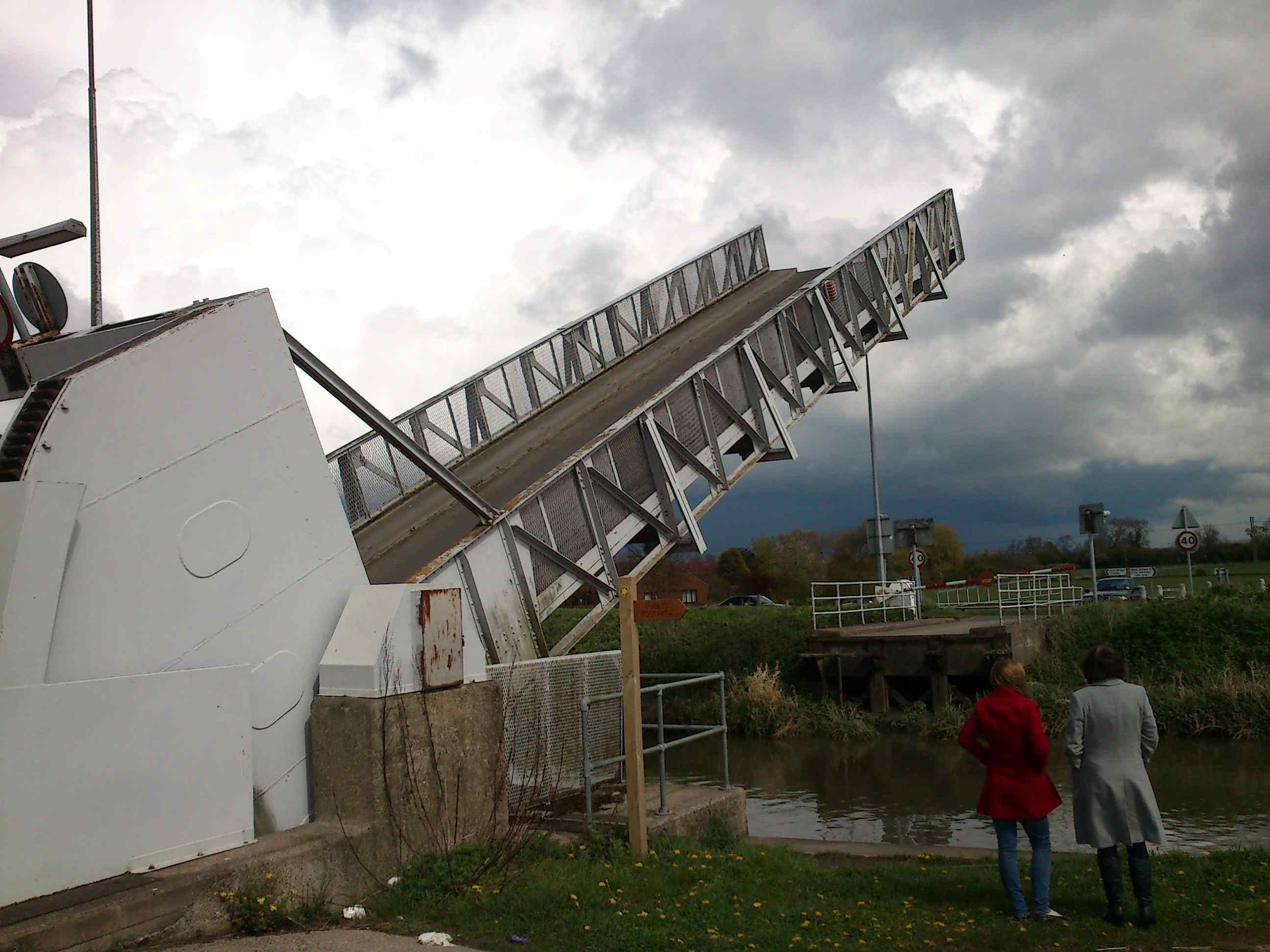
Grovehill (Weel) Bridge, Beverley

On its route southwards, the river passes the former junction with Aike Beck, once navigable to Lockington Landing, but the stream was subsequently re-routed to join the Arram Beck. The Leven Canal used to join on the east bank, but the entrance lock has been replaced by a sluice. The Arram Beck flows in from the west, and then the river is crossed by Hull Bridge, the cause of repeated disagreement between the owners of the Driffield Navigation and the Corporation of Beverley, who owned the bridge. Just above Beverley Beck, which joins from the west, is Grovehill Bridge, now a lift bridge but once a ferry bridge.

Once the river reaches the outskirts of Hull, its course is marked by a series of bridges, most of which open to allow boats to pass. There are swing bridges, lift bridges and bascule bridges, and the river becomes part of the Port of Hull. The river, which is the dividing line between West and East Hull, bisects the city's industrial area. The bridges can cause traffic delays during high tides, though river traffic is less than it once was. The Beverley and Barmston Drain rejoins the river above Scott Street Bridge. Below North Bridge, an unused dry dock on the west bank marks the former entrance to Queens Dock. Below Drypool Bridge, a muddy basin on the east bank was once the entrance to Drypool Basin and Victoria Dock. The river reaches its confluence with the Humber Estuary in the centre of Kingston upon Hull. At its mouth, a tidal barrier has been constructed to prevent tidal surges from entering the river. In the past, these had regularly flooded the town and the flat countryside to the north.

== History ==
The River Hull has served as a navigation and a drainage channel, and has been subject to the conflicts that this usually creates, as water levels need to be raised for navigation, but lowered for efficient drainage. In 1213, the Archbishops of York laid claim to the river, and declared their right to navigate on a 24-foot (7.3 m) channel. A number of fish-weirs made navigation difficult, and the Archbishop negotiated their removal in 1296, so that a wharf could be established at Grovehill to serve the town of Beverley. By 1321, river rights had been extended to the charging of tolls. One-third of a shilling (4d equivalent to 1.7p decimal currency) was charged for each bushel carried on the river between Emmotland and the Humber, but the merchants of Hull were unhappy with this; eventually the river had free navigation, and goods could be carried on it without toll. The Arram Beck was also exempt from all tolls. It has remained free, except for 1 mile (1.6 km) from the mouth, which is part of the Port of Hull and is under the control of Hull Corporation.

The outlet of the river onto the Humber is thought to have changed in the early medieval period. The original outlet has been identified at a place called Limekiln creek. A second channel Sayers Creek was cut or widened, with both outlets existing simultaneously at one point. Limekiln creek was subsequently reduced in flow to the level of a drain.

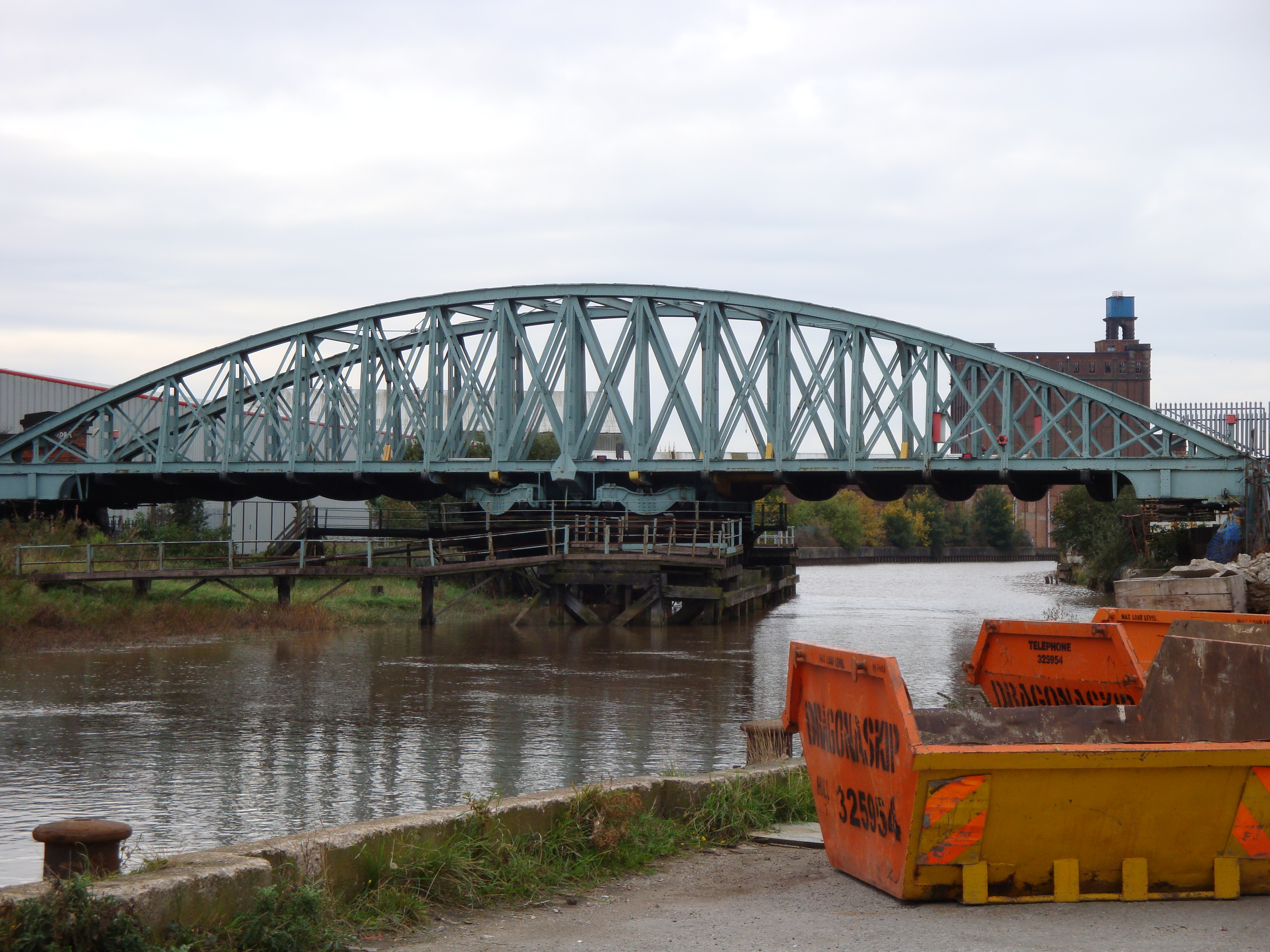
The Hull and Barnsley Railway Bridge, built in 1885

The lower river was bordered by salt marshes in medieval times, when efforts were first made to drain them. Further upstream, channels were cut through the fens in the twelfth and thirteenth centuries by the monks of Meaux Abbey, primarily to enable travel by boat, but these gradually became part of the drainage system. John Smeaton, when asked by the merchants of Driffield to advise on ways to allow keels to reach their town, suggested a small cut of about 1.2 miles (1.9 km) including one lock, from the river near Wansford. The merchants sought a second opinion, and John Grundy, Jr. suggested a much longer canal, running for 5 miles (8.0 km) from Fisholme on the Frodingham Beck. When fully opened in 1770, the new route was some 3 miles (4.8 km) shorter than the river, which follows an extremely winding course in its upper reaches. The river above Aike was now considered to be part of the Driffield Navigation, and tolls were charged for its use. Also in this period the first cut of the Holderness Drain was made, enabled by an act of Parliament, the Holderness Drainage Act 1764 (4 Geo. 3. c. 47 Pr.), originally outfalling onto the river. In addition to the drainage works to the east of the river, the banks were raised for 17 miles (27 km) on the east side, to prevent flooding.

Although beyond their jurisdiction, the navigation commissioners attempted to extend their powers, to improve the river below the junction with Aike Beck. They particularly wanted to replace the stone Hull Bridge, near Beverley, with a swing bridge, which would make it easier for keels to reach Frodingham bridge. Beverley Corporation objected, because the bridge was the main route of communication between Beverley and Holderness, and the commissioners instead dredged parts of the river to improve access. Plans to improve Hull Bridge were again resisted by Beverley Corporation in 1799, but an agreement was finally reached in 1801, and an act of Parliament, the Hull and Frodingham Beck Navigation Act 1801 (41 Geo. 3. (U.K.) c. cxxxiv), was obtained in July of that year. William Chapman acted as engineer, as the act authorised the construction of towpaths, a new cut between Bethels Bridge and the lock at Struncheon Hill, to avoid a long loop in the river, and rebuilding of the bridge. The bridge cost £500, half of which was met by Richard Bethell, the owner of the Leven Canal, on condition that the tolls for passing through it were reduced significantly.

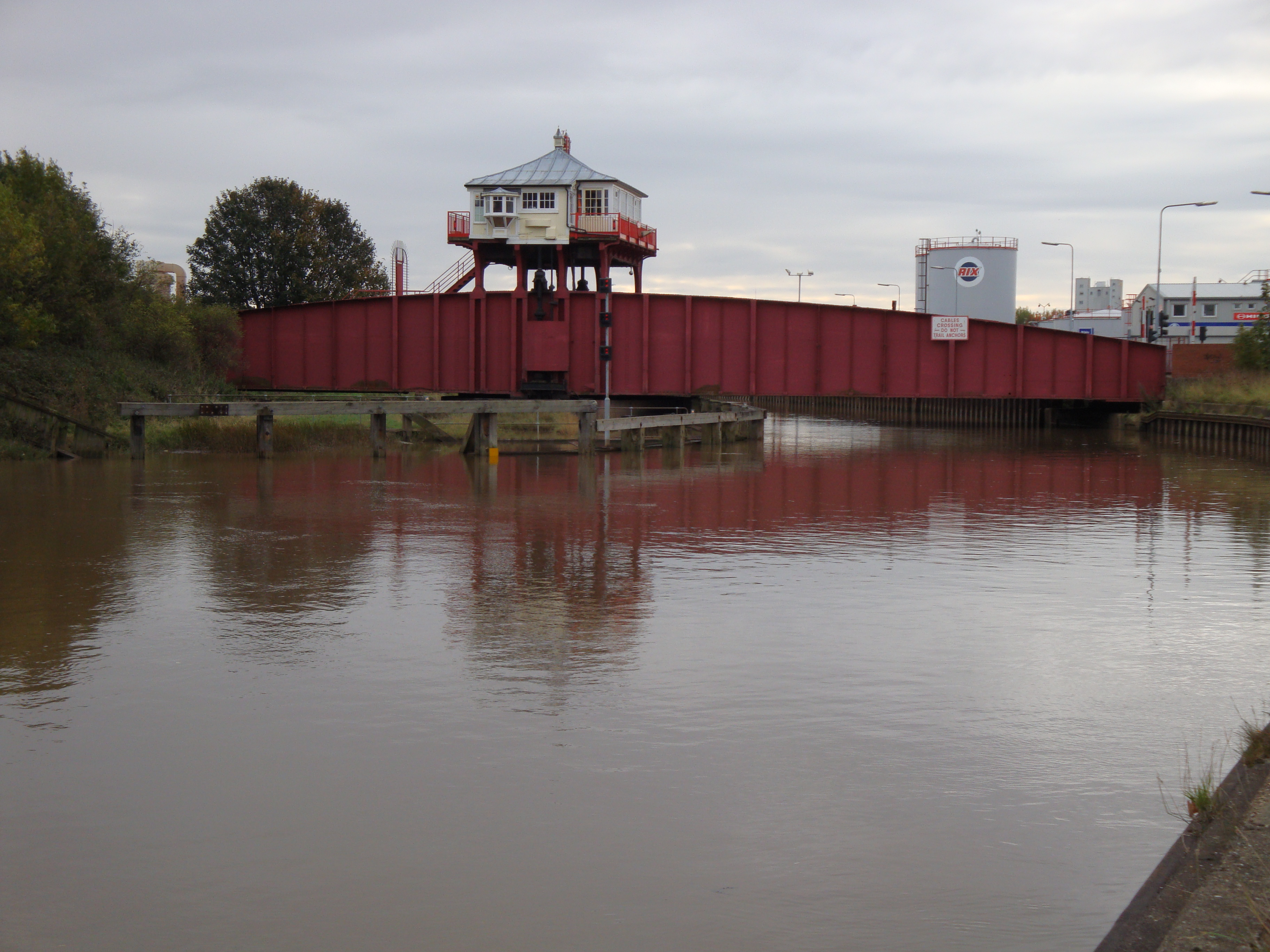
Wilmington Bridge, now used as a cycleway and footbridge

Passage through Hull had long been difficult, because of the number of ships which used the river for loading and unloading goods. In 1794, the merchants of Beverley had advocated the building of docks at Hull, with a separate entrance, so that traffic to the upper river would not be impeded, while the Driffield Navigation had unsuccessful attempted to get a clause inserted into the act of Parliament which the Hull Dock Company obtained in 1840, to ensure free passage for vessels, and the removal of tolls for boats not using the docks. The navigation company also received complaints from the Beverley and Barmston Drainage Commissioners, who believed that water levels were being kept at a higher level than was good for drainage.

In 1980, the Environment Agency constructed a tidal barrier at the mouth of the river. The structure spans the river, and a huge steel gate, weighing 202 tonnes, can be lowered into the waterway, effectively sealing the river from the Humber, and preventing tidal surges from moving up the river and flooding parts of the city and the low-lying areas beyond. The gate was initially lowered about twelve times a year, and protects around 17,000 properties. In 2009, a £10 million upgrade of the structure was started, to ensure it would stay operational for a further 30 years. The upgrade included a new drive mechanism, which raises and lowers the gate, and pivots it when it is at the top of the structure, so that it lies horizontally rather than vertically. It also included a new control system. In July 2017 the barrier was granted Grade II listed status. Plans have been considered to build a barrage at the mouth of the Hull where it joins the Humber Estuary to maintain a constant water level as it passes through the city. The idea was first raised by the Abercrombie report, which considered how to redevelop Hull after significant destruction during the Second World War. The estimated cost of such a project was around £195 million in 2007.

== Traffic ==
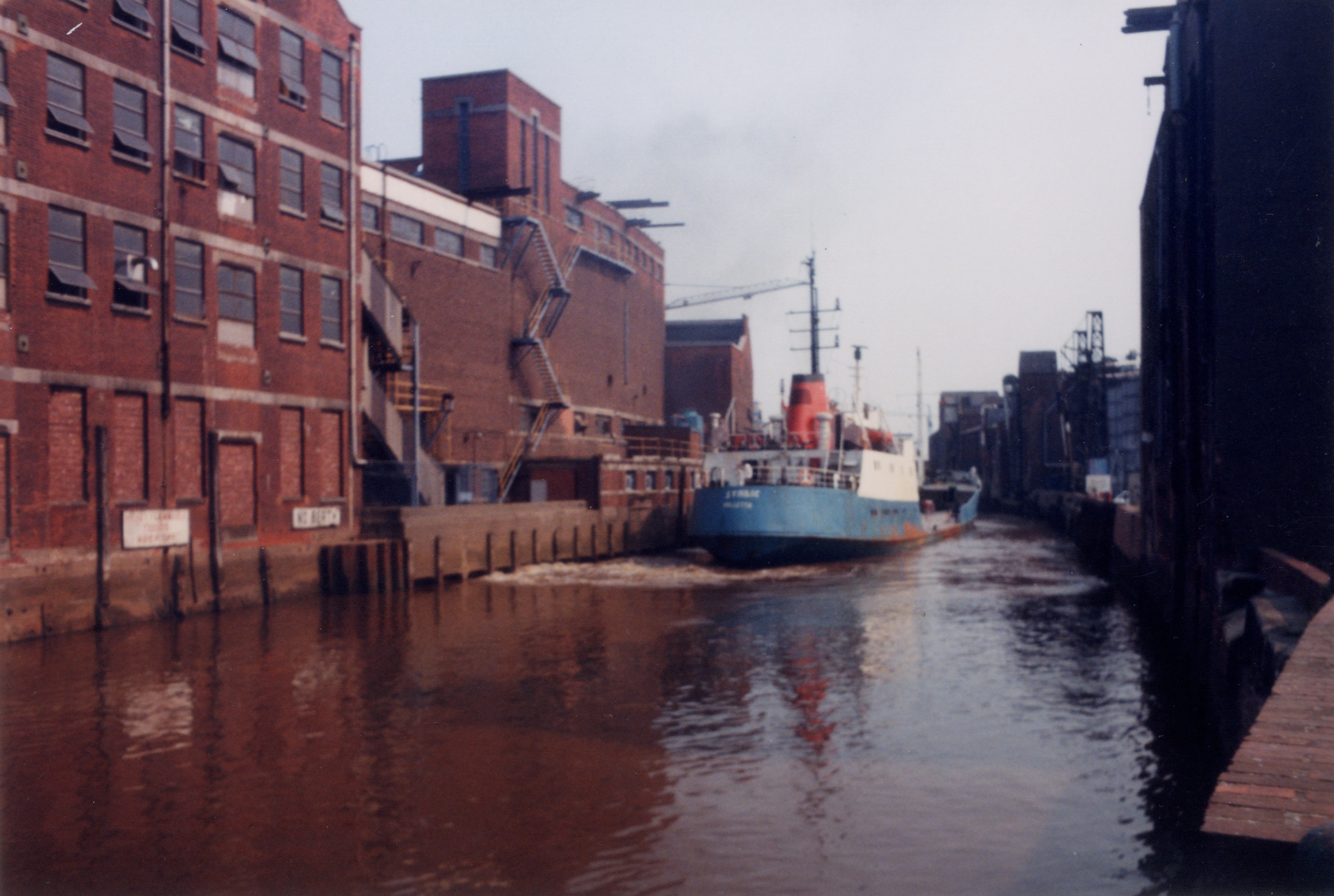
Freighter near Scott Street Bridge 1990

Because the river was a free river, there are no figures for traffic on the lower river. However, it connected to a number of waterways on which tolls were collected, and so an indication of the traffic can be gained from the figures for these waterways. The main cargoes on Beverley Beck in 1730 were coal, bricks, turfs and wool, together with cereal crops, consisting of wheat, barley, oats and malt. Receipts from tolls more than doubled between 1732 and 1748, after which the tolls were let to an independent collector. The annual rent charged for this privilege doubled again between 1748 and 1792. There was a steady expansion of trade on the Driffield Navigation during the same period, as the dividends paid to shareholders rose from 1.5 to 4 per cent. In 1789, Bainton, Boyes and Co negotiated a lump sum payment to cover coal from the Aire and Calder Navigation to their new carpet factory and the export of their carpets in the downstream direction. The factory later became a corn mill.

Toll rentals continued to increase on the Beverley Beck, rising from £190 to £435 between 1793 and 1835. Some 31,185 tons of cargo were carried in 1838. In 1817, a steam packet service started to run between Driffield and Hull. Three return trips each week were made, but the journey times were too long, and an advertisement in 1825 indicated that the engine had been altered and an express steam packet service would commence. Three boats were recorded as trading between Driffield and Hull every other day in a directory of Yorkshire published in 1823. Traffic for 1832 included 7,394 chaldrons of coal, 18,173 quarters of wheat, 7,745 quarters of oats, 19,396 quarters of barley and 4,555 sacks of flour. An additional 1,564 quarters of wheat and 8,194 sacks of flour were carried to or from Foston Mill, reached from Frodingham Beck. A regular carrier also operated between the Leven Canal and Hull once a week.

Between 1848 and 1905, traffic on Beverley Beck more than trebled, from 33,498 tons to 101,540 tons. Coal and other minerals accounted for around one quarter of the traffic in 1905, while goods carried in 1906 included fertiliser, burnt ore, flour and scrap metal. Commercial traffic continued into the 1970s, when tolls of £2,365 were collected on 28,169 tons of cargo. Traffic on the Driffield Navigation was relatively steady between 1871 and 1905, falling slightly from 35,654 to 32,666 tons. Goods carried included coal, linseed, cottonseed, wheat, flour and artificial manures. In 1922, £7 of income was received from pleasure craft using the navigation. Traffic declined during the 1930s, with commercial traffic finally ceasing in 1944. The Leven Canal carried 4,242 tons in 1888 and 4,546 in 1905, but then succumbed to road competition, and closed in 1935.

== Drainage ==
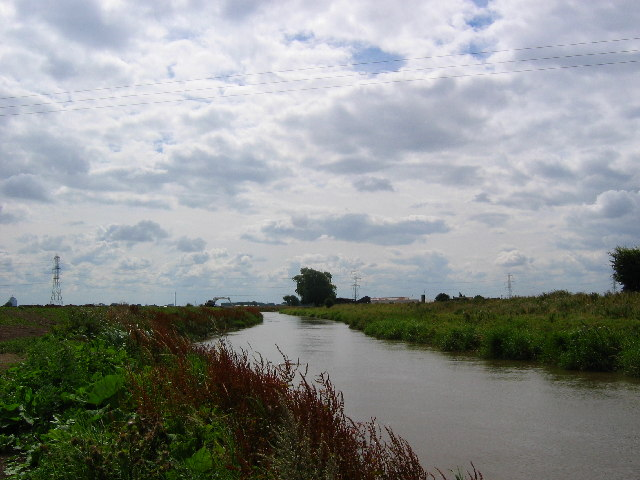
River Hull at Wawne

The problems of flooding of the land adjacent to the river were addressed by the construction of catchwater drains to both sides of it. The east side of the river was protected by the Holderness Drainage scheme. John Grundy worked on plans for the scheme which would protect 11,000 acres (4,500 ha) of low-lying land to the north-east of Hull. John Smeaton was also involved, although the final report was largely Grundy's work, and an act of Parliament to authorise the work, the Holderness Drainage Act 1764 (4 Geo. 3. c. 47 Pr.), was passed on 5 April 1764. The Trustees for the scheme wrote to Grundy and Smeaton in May 1764, asking them to work on the project. Grundy's wife had died only a fortnight previously, and the two engineers corresponded, but besides valuable comment on Grundy's plans for the outfall sluice, Smeaton had no further involvement, and it was Grundy who ran the project, which included 17 miles (27 km) of barrier bank along the east side of the river. John Hoggard acted as Superintendent for the scheme, while Joseph Page was appointed as resident engineer, to oversee the construction of the drains and the outfall sluice. Grundy made regular visits until October 1767, by which time the sluice and the main drainage channels were completed, at which point he and Page moved on, while Hoggard oversaw additional work on the drains and banks, which lasted for several more years. By the time of its completion in 1772, the scheme had cost £24,000.

Despite the Holderness scheme, there were still problems near Leven and Weel, and William Jessop spent a month inspecting the area before writing a report in July 1786. His plan advocated separating the water which fell on the uplands to the north and flowed through the low-lying areas, from the local drainage of those low-lying areas. George Plummer carried out most of the subsequent survey work on Jessop's behalf, although Jessop surveyed the River Hull in 1787, to identify how the outfall could be improved. Jessop visited the works from time to time, making seven visits between 1789 and 1792, while the day to day oversight of the scheme was handled by Plummer as resident engineer. Plummer was succeeded by Anthony Bower, who was engineer from 1792 to 1795, and the whole scheme was completed in 1805, having cost £16,000.

In 1796, Robert Chapman was asked to report on possible solutions for flooding to the west. His report formed the basis for the Beverley and Barmston Drainage Act, which was passed by Parliament in June 1798. Chapman was appointed as engineer for the scheme, which would cost £115,000, and would provide flood defences and drainage for 12,600 acres (5,100 ha) of land to the west of the river. The project included the construction of 23 miles (37 km) of drainage cuts, and building embankments along 20 miles (32 km) of the river. At Hull, an outfall sluice was constructed, and the drain passed through tunnels under eleven waterways, including the Beverley Beck. 27 bridges were built to carry roads over the drain, and the whole project was finished in 1810.

== River crossings ==
There are several bridges in the Hull area which cross the River Hull. Details of them are shown in the following table, starting from that furthest north and moving south to the river mouth.

Bridge	Date built	Notes
New Hull Bridge, Beverley	1974	A fixed flat deck concrete bridge, carrying the A1035 Tickton bypass
Hull Bridge, Beverley	1976	A fixed foot bridge, which replaced a 1913-built steel rolling bridge once Tickton bypass opened.
Grovehill Bridge, Beverley	1953	A truss-girder lift bridge, which replaced a ferry bridge
Ennerdale Link Bridges	1997	Twin bascule bridges. These completed the Ennerdale Link bypass construction of which started c.1992, with the river crossing originally intended to be a tunnel. Work on the tunnel was halted in 1994 after difficulties with the ground conditions were encountered. Instead bridges designed by Rendel Palmer and Tritton based on those already installed at Stoneferry were used. The work was part of a wider scheme of roads around Hull to give better access to the docks (via Hedon Road) from the Beverley South Western bypass (A1079). The new bridge was a twin bascule bridge each with 250t bridge decks and a total weight of 800t, in including the 600t counterbalance.
Sutton Road Bridge	1939	A Scherzer type rolling lift bridge. Built by Cleveland Bridge & Engineering Company, with elegant Art Deco / Neo-Georgian style operating houses.
Stoneferry Bridge	1988–91	Twin bascule bridges with 105-foot (32 m) leaves, one for each direction of traffic. Designed by Rendel Palmer and Tritton, and built by Cementation Construction. Replaced a 1905 swing bridge, and earlier ferry, thought to have originally been a ford at this point.
Hull Bridge	1885	Steel bowstring span swing bridge. Grade II Listed 1994. Built by the Hull and Barnsley Railway in 1885, still used by freight trains.
Wilmington Swing Bridge	1907	A Grade II Listed railway swing bridge, built by the North Eastern Railway. It opened on 7 May 1907, and replaced the original 1853 bridge. Railway use ceased in 1968, and it is now used as a footpath and cycleway.
Sculcoates Bridge	1874	Sculcoates Bridge, a wrought iron swing bridge, was opened in 1875. The bridge consisted of a fixed span on the east bank of 27 feet (8.2 m) and a counterbalanced swing span made of 113 feet (34 m) girders, with a river span of 56 feet (17 m). The design was by J. Fox district engineer, the bridge was constructed by the Bridge and Roofing Co. of Darlaston. Total cost was £18,000. Grade II listed in 1994. This is the oldest river bridge in the city, and connects the areas of Wilmington, Kingston upon Hull and Sculcoates
Scott Street Bridge defunct	1901	Construction of the bridge connecting Scott Street in the west with Lime and Jenning streets in the east began October 1901, with and estimated cost of £20,000. A double bascule bridge. The bridge, bridgemasters hut, railings and lamps were Grade II listed in 1994. It was permanently raised in 1994 as the structure was too weak to carry traffic, and the cost of full repair was estimated at £5 million. In 2018, Banksy visited this bridge and left a piece of graffiti to honour Hull's year as City of Culture. Scott Street Bridge was finally removed in 2020.
North Bridge	1928–32	There has been a bridge at this point (close to the North Gate of the city walls) since 1541, before which there was a ferry. The bridge here has been modified, rebuilt and enlarged several times. A hydraulically operated horizontal drawbridge was constructed in 1870 connecting Charlotte Street and Witham. In 1925 plans were submitted for a new bridge; of which one costed at £275,000 with a straightened approach road approximately 30 yards (27 m) north of the 1870 bridge was accepted. The bridge was contracted in 1927 for £86,100 to the Widnes Foundry (1295) Ltd, who constructed as a Scherzer rolling lift bridge (or "Walking lift bridge"). The bridge was Grade II listed in 1994.
Drypool Bridge	1961	Scherzer rolling lift bridge – a type of Bascule bridge Replaced an earlier swing bridge, also known as Drypool Bridge or Salthouse Lane Bridge, sanctioned 1885, with construction beginning 1887, and opening 1889, at a cost of £18,550, with the main ironwork assembled by J. Butler and Co., of Stanningley, Leeds; the river walls and approaches by T.B Mather of Hull. The bridge was hydraulically powered from a supply provided by the Hull Hydraulic Power Company. Image.
Scale Lane Footbridge	2011–13	Pedestrian swing bridge between Scale Lane (west) and Tower Street (east). An award-winning design by Renato Benedetti. Originally scheduled to open late 2010, delayed due to winding up of funding agencies as a result of the late-2000s recession, main span installation began 25 February 2012. The bridge was officially opened in June 2013.
Myton Swing Bridge	1981	An asymmetric cable stayed box girder steel swing bridge on the A63 Garrison Road, with spans of 182.2 and 93.4 feet (55.5 and 28.5 m).
South Bridge defunct	1865–1944	Toll Bridge. Also known as the "Ha'penny Bridge", it was built to give better access to the newly built Victoria Dock. Closed 1934. Swing bridge located between Blackfriargate and Humber Street (between present Myton Bridge and Tidal Barrier). Image. The engineer was John Hawkshaw, the contractor was Henry Grissell (Regent's Canal Ironworks Co.).
Millennium Bridge	2001	A pedestrian swing bridge giving access to The Deep, with a span of 102 feet (31 m)

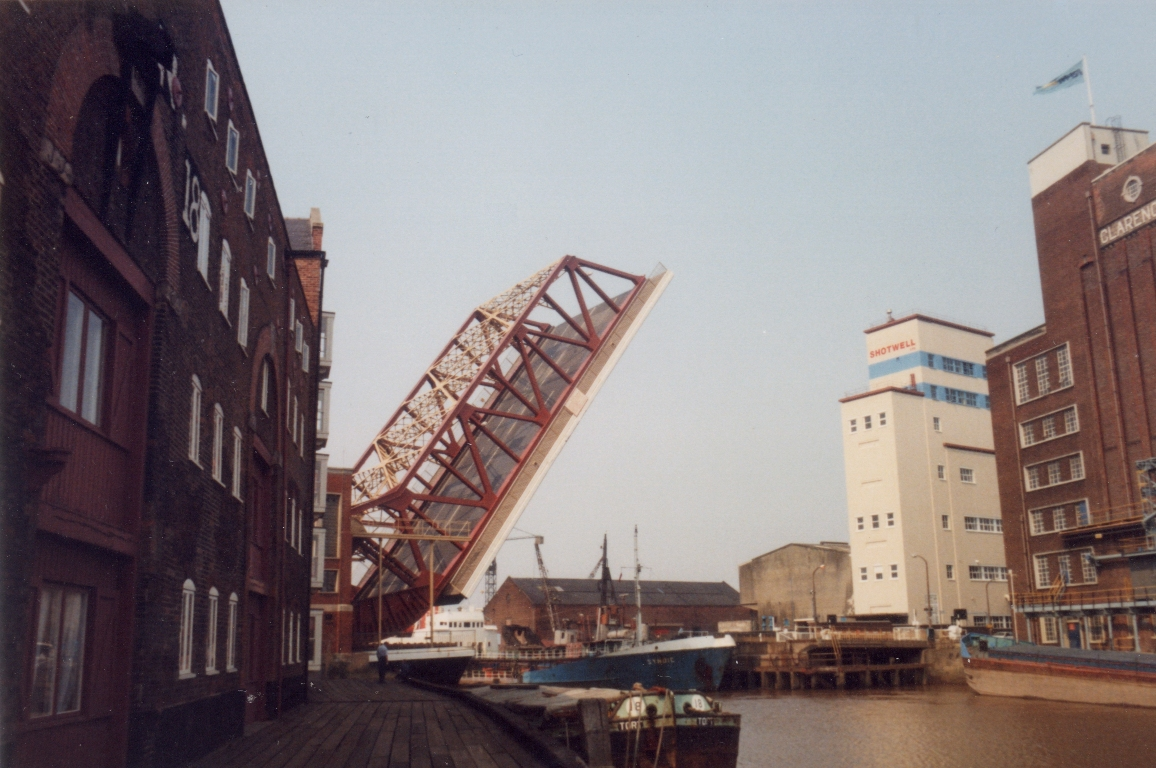
Drypool Bridge, raised to allow a freighter to pass

The present Drypool Bridge was designed by W. Morris, the Hull City Engineer, and it was built in Hull. The previous wrought iron swing bridge, which had opened in 1888, was too narrow, with a carriageway which was 16 feet (4.9 m) wide. It was closed in May 1959, so that it could be demolished and Morris's new bridge opened in March 1961.

Scott Street Bridge had gradually deteriorated, and a public consultation was held in 1986, to determine its future. By that time a 10-ton weight limit had been imposed on traffic using the bridge, because of its poor structural state. Three suggestions were made as to its future. These were to close and demolish it, to refurbish it at an estimated cost of £1.6 million, and to build a new bridge on the same site but a different alignment, to eliminate the awkward turn at the west end, which was costed at £2 million. None of these actions have been taken, as the bridge leaves were raised in 1994, and have remained raised ever since. Consideration was given in 2007 to preserving two of the hydraulic rams which operated the bridge, during planning to demolish the structure. The Hull Hydraulic Power Company was set up in 1872, and by 1876 was operating a pumping station on Machell Street. This supplied water to a high pressure main which ran from Wellington Street to Sculcoates Bridge, and was used by local industries to power machinery, including the bridge when it was constructed. Although the power company closed in the 1940s, it made Hull the first city in the world to have a public system of power distribution.

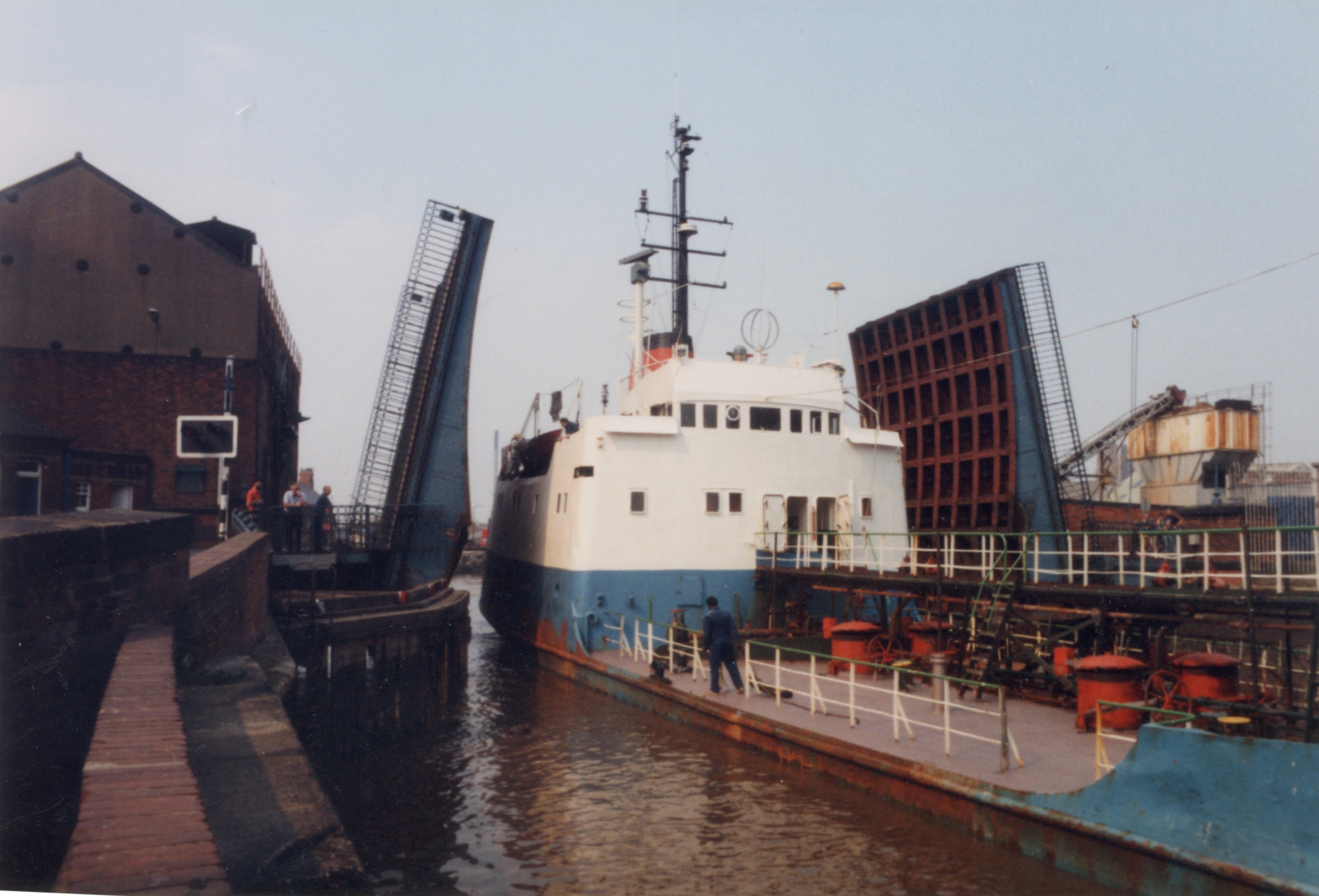
Scott Street Bridge 1990

The design for the Ennerdale Link road included a tunnel under the river. Initial investigations suggested that there was a layer of boulder clay below the alluvium of the river bed, and that a chalk aquifer was below the clay. Construction work started in July 1991. A cofferdam was built on the east bank, and the cutting which would have provided access to the twin-bore tunnel was nearly excavated when a 6.6-foot (2.0 m) hole appeared in the river bed, and the entire site flooded. A 3-month investigation took place, which suggested that it would be difficult to finish the tunnel and maintain the integrity of the aquifer. Despite some £10 million having been spent on the project, it was abandoned in 1993. A contract for a replacement bridge was awarded in June 1995 and the river was crossed by twin lift bridges, which were opened in April 1997. The project had cost £30 million, compared to an original budget of just £13 million.

A tunnel was successfully constructed under the river in 2001. The 6.2-mile (10.0 km) long sewer runs from the city centre to a treatment works at Salt End. It was excavated using two tunnelling machines, which were manufactured in Canada and were named Maureen and Gloria. The tunnel was officially opened on 21 August 2001, when a Mini car was driven through it, recreating scenes from the film The Italian Job. Before 1897, there had been a ferry at Grovehill, and a shipyard on the east bank, owned by Joseph Scarr. To assist his workers to reach the shipyard, Scarr designed and built a ferry bridge, which cost him £300. It consisted of a large rectangular pontoon, above which was fitted a bridge deck with handrails. Two jack screws enabled the deck to be raised or lowered in relation to the pontoon, so that it remained at approximately the same height, whatever the state of the tide. On the eastern bank, Scarr constructed a variable-height landing, but the landing on the west bank was constructed by Beverley Council, and was fixed. Scarr campaigned to have a variable landing here as well, and was prepared to fund it, but his requests were always rejected. The fixed landing made access to the bridge difficult at high tides. When a boat needed to pass, the west end was freed, and the pontoon swung round to lie parallel to the bank, either upstream or downstream, depending on the state of the tide. It would then be winched back into position by a small barrel winch. At night the bridge was closed and moored beside the bank.

Responsibility for the bridge was taken over by Beverley Council before the Second World War. Its condition deteriorated, and in 1948, they attempted to replace it with a footbridge around 400 yards (370 m) further upstream. Because the ferry rights had been in existence for more than 600 years, an Act of Parliament was needed, and this was thwarted by a petition containing 84 signatures, presented by the people of Weel to the House of Lords. Plans for a new lift bridge were drawn up, and it was opened on 19 October 1953.

In 1913, the Hull Bridge upstream of Beverley, which had caused so much disagreement in the 18th century until it had been replaced in 1801, was demolished by the County Council, who installed a steel rolling bridge in its place. Once the Tickton Bypass bridge had been built a short distance upstream, it no longer needed to carry road traffic, and it was replaced by a footbridge in 1976.

Millennium Bridge, opened 2001

At the other end of the river, the Millennium Bridge was opened in 2001. There was once a ferry at this point, before 1865, which gave access to the Victoria Dock, opened in 1850. South Bridge replaced the ferry in 1865, making it easier for workers to reach the dock. The swing footbridge was closed in 1934, but was not demolished until 1944.

== Water quality ==
The Environment Agency measure the water quality of the river systems in England. Each is given an overall ecological status, which may be one of five levels: high, good, moderate, poor and bad. There are several components that are used to determine this, including biological status, which looks at the quantity and varieties of invertebrates, angiosperms and fish. Chemical status, which compares the concentrations of various chemicals against known safe concentrations, is rated good or fail.

The water quality of the River Hull system was as follows in 2016.

Section	Ecological Status	Chemical Status	Overall Status	Length	Catchment	Channel
Driffield Navigation	Good	Good	Good			artificial
Lowthorpe/Kelk/Foston Bks from Source to Frodingham Beck	Poor	Good	Poor	10.4 miles (16.7 km)	35.90 square miles (93.0 km^{2})	
Old Howe/Frodingham Beck to R Hull	Moderate	Good	Moderate	4.2 miles (6.8 km)	9.81 square miles (25.4 km^{2})	heavily modified
Hull from West Beck to Arram Beck	Moderate	Good	Moderate	6.6 miles (10.6 km)	1.72 square miles (4.5 km^{2})	heavily modified
Ella Dyke	Moderate	Good	Moderate	4.2 miles (6.8 km)	2.00 square miles (5.2 km^{2})	heavily modified
High Hunsley to Woodmansey Area	Good	Good	Good	4.3 miles (6.9 km)	5.87 square miles (15.2 km^{2})	artificial
Hull from Arram Beck to Humber	Moderate	Good	Moderate	9.1 miles (14.6 km)	9.34 square miles (24.2 km^{2})	heavily modified

The reasons for the quality being less than good include sewage discharge and physical modification of the channel.

== Points of interest ==
Point	Coordinates (Links to map resources)	OS Grid Ref	Notes
Source	54.0081°N 0.4755°W	TA000579	Springs near Elmswell
Driffield Railway bridge	53.9949°N 0.4377°W	TA025565	River Hull below here
Corpslanding	53.9614°N 0.3803°W	TA063529	Limit of navigation
Emmotland Junction	53.9509°N 0.3527°W	TA082517	Frodingham Beck
Struncheon Hill lock	53.9339°N 0.3571°W	TA079498	Driffield Navigation
Leven Canal	53.8896°N 0.3949°W	TA055449	disused entrance lock
Beverley Beck	53.8399°N 0.3946°W	TA057393	entrance lock
Ennerdale Link bridge	53.7938°N 0.3589°W	TA082343	A1033
Stoneferry bridge	53.7675°N 0.3302°W	TA101314	A1165
Sculcoates bridge (Chapman Street)	53.7542°N 0.3290°W	TA10272994	Disused listed bridge
Beverley & Barmston Drain	53.7518°N 0.3329°W	TA100296	Sluice
Tidal Barrier	53.7399°N 0.3307°W	TA101283	Just above River Humber

== See also ==
- Rivers of the United Kingdom

== Bibliography ==
- Allison, K. J., ed. (1969). "22. Communications : Bridges". A History of the County of York East Riding: Volume 1: The City of Kingston upon Hull. British History Online.
- Allison, K. J., ed. (1989). "41. Boundaries and Communications : Roads and Bridges". A History of the County of York East Riding: Volume 6: The borough and liberties of Beverley. British History Online.
- Crosby, Kathleen (1980). The Old Grovehill Ferry Bridge. Lockington Publishing Co. ISBN 0-905490-15-0.
- Cumberlidge, Jane (2009). Inland Waterways of Great Britain (8th Ed.). Imray Laurie Norie and Wilson. ISBN 978-1-84623-010-3.
- Hadfield, Charles (1972). The Canals of Yorkshire and North East England (Vol 1). David and Charles. ISBN 0-7153-5719-0.
- Hadfield, Charles (1973). The Canals of Yorkshire and North East England (Vol 2). David and Charles. ISBN 0-7153-5975-4.
- Marsh, Terry; Hannaford, Jamie (2008). UK Hydrometric Register (PDF). Natural Environment Research Council. ISBN 978-0-9557672-2-7. Archived from the original (PDF) on 31 October 2014.
- McNicol, Colin (2002). Hull's Victoria Dock Village. Highgate Publications (Beverley). ISBN 978-1-902645-24-7. Archived from the original on 13 October 2011.
- Skempton, Sir Alec; et al. (2002). A Biographical Dictionary of Civil Engineers in Great Britain and Ireland: Vol 1: 1500 to 1830. Thomas Telford. ISBN 0-7277-2939-X.
