= Skerne =

Skerne is the name of various locations and related items:

== County Durham ==
- River Skerne - river in County Durham, tributary of the River Tees
- Haughton-le-Skerne - village in Darlington, to the west of the Skerne
  - Haughton-le-Skerne F.C. - former association football club in Darlington
- Preston-le-Skerne - hamlet in County Durham, next to the Skerne
- Skerne Bridge - railway bridge across the Skerne; oldest in continuous use
- Skerne Park - housing estate near the Skerne in Darlington

== East Riding of Yorkshire ==
- Skerne - village in the East Riding of Yorkshire
  - Skerne sword - 10th-century sword found near Skerne
- Skerne and Wansford - civil parish in the East Riding of Yorkshire

== People ==
- Robert Skerne - MP for Surrey in 1420 and 1422
