= West Beck =

River in the East Riding of Yorkshire, England

Coordinates: 53.951°N 0.348°W

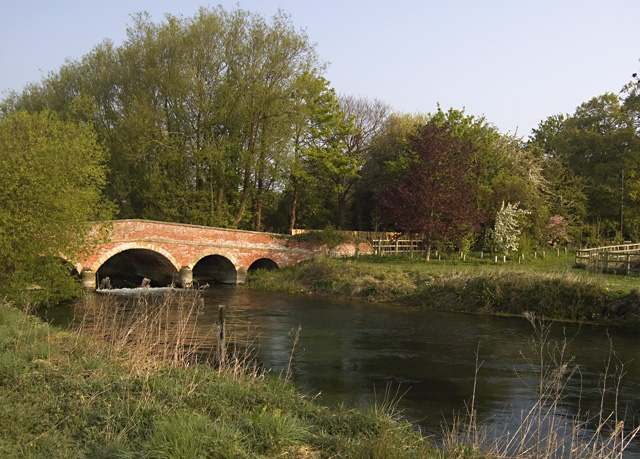
- Wansford Bridge spanning the West Beck

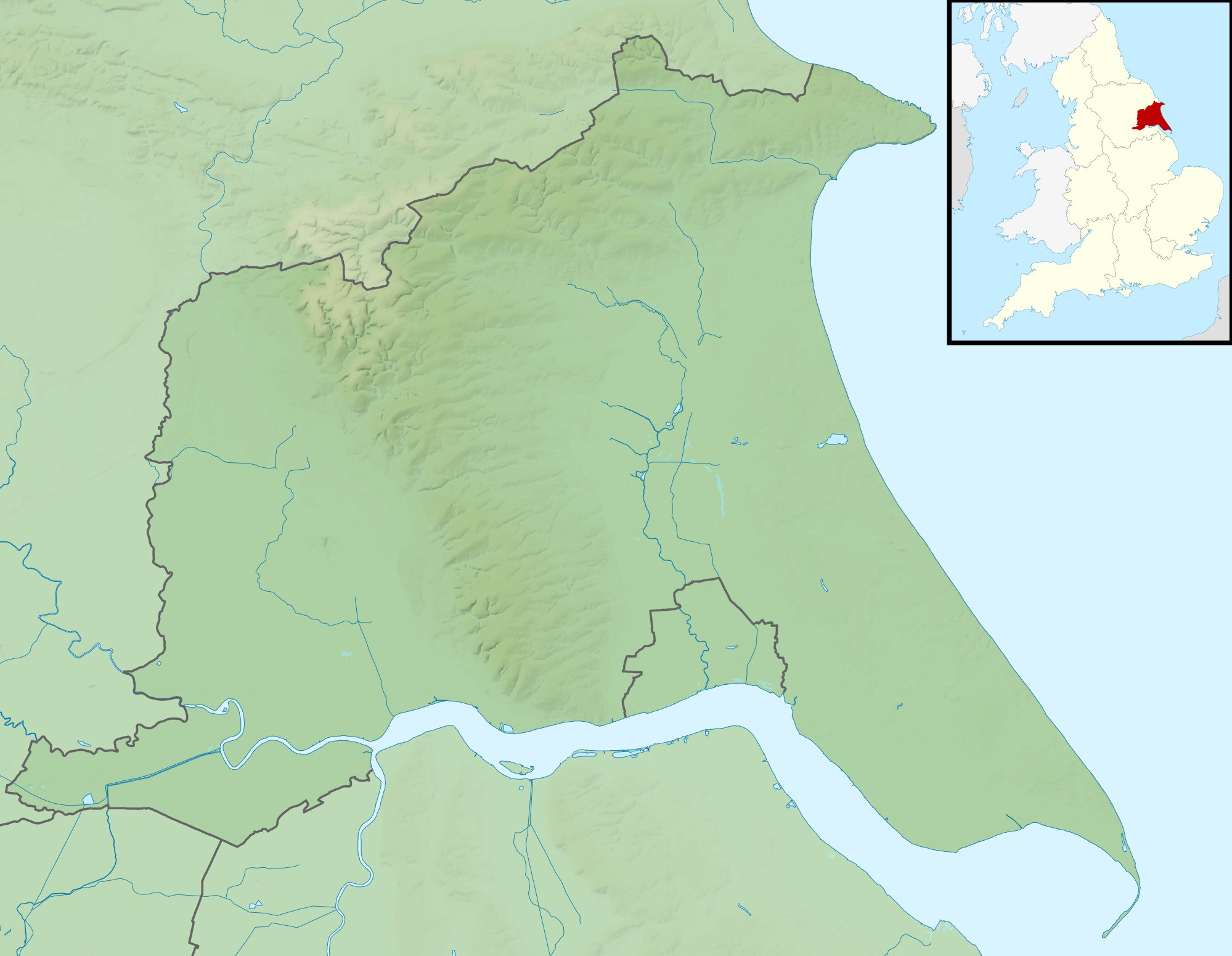
- Point at which West Beck becomes the River Hull shown within the East Riding of Yorkshire

Location
- Country: England

Physical characteristics
- Length: 15.3 miles (24.6 km)
- Basin size: 90.5 square miles (234.3 km^{2})

Basin features
- River system: River Hull
- Tributaries
  - left: Little Driffield Beck
  - right: Gipsey Race; Driffield Trout Stream; Main Drain; Skerne Beck

West Beck is the common name given to the upper section of the old River Hull, as it rises in the foothills of the Yorkshire Wolds. After reaching Frodingham Beck at Emmotland, it becomes called the River Hull. It is noteworthy for being the most northerly chalk stream in England. It provides fly fishing for wild brown trout and grayling.

== Course ==
Starting at Elmswell as a spring from a chalk aquifer, it follows a course which takes it past Little Driffield, around the southern edge of Driffield, through Wansford, past Corpslanding, and joins the Driffield Navigation at Emmotland. In the upper reaches it is known as Elmswell Beck, then Driffield Beck and finally West Beck. As it leaves Driffield, it is referred to as the River Hull as well as West Beck on Environment Agency mapping despite the River Hull traditionally being called so when the beck reaches Emmotland and merges with other watercourses. For the last 1.5 miles (2.4 km) of the river approaching Corpslanding Bridge it is known as Driffield Navigation (West Beck). Because of the abundance of springs that feed the beck in its upper reaches, it has been observed that West Beck contributes over 80% of the inflow to the River Hull.

== History ==
The beck was used to power two corn mills; Kings Mill and Bell Mills, both on the upper reach. Kings Mill is a private residence and Bell Mills are in industrial use. Bell Mills were built in 1792 and there are still sluice gates and a mill race adjacent.

The lower sections of the west beck are navigable, and Yorkshire Keels used to reach Wansford. Due to the shallowness of the river, an Act of Parliament was passed in 1801 to create the Driffield Navigation and other associated works. The main route was made further north using Frodingham Beck, and then a new canal from Fisholme through Wansford to Driffield, but the act included navigation to Corpslanding.

The village of Hutton Cranswick created a wharf at Corpslanding, and this has now become the upper legal limit of navigation on the waterway.

The river is for fly fishing only using either dry flies or nymph imitative patterns. Large stretches of the river are owned by fishing syndicates, however day ticket fishing is available at Mulberry Whin. Mulberry Whin offers over a mile of double bank chalk stream fishing on a day ticket basis.

== Ecology ==
The beck flows past two wetland areas promoted and maintained by Yorkshire Wildlife Trust: Snakeholm Pastures and Skerne Wetlands. The entire headwaters are designated as an SSSI on account of the chalk base, water quality and plant life.

== See also ==
- Driffield Navigation
