= Bethells Bridge =

Swing bridge in Yorkshire, England

Coordinates: 53°56′39″N 0°21′26″W

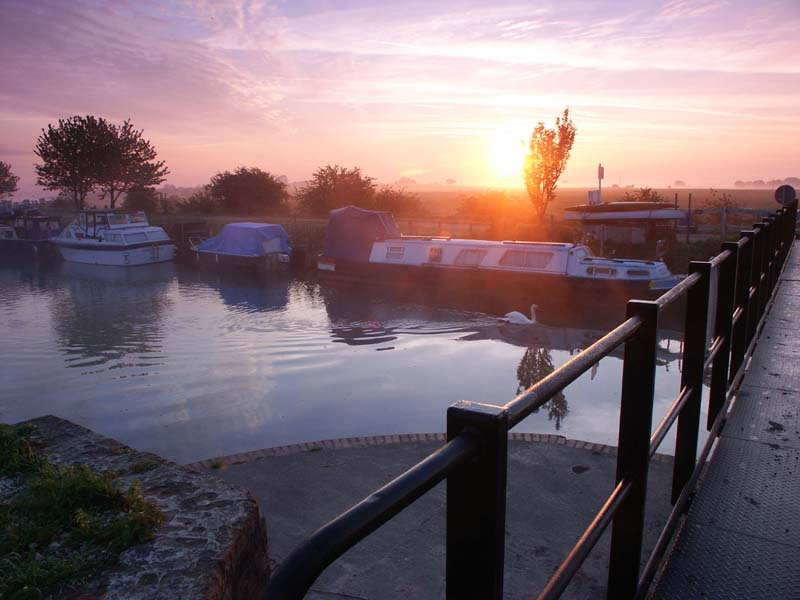
A new dawn over the new swing bridge

The Bethells Bridge is a swing bridge on the Driffield Navigation in the East Riding of Yorkshire, England. The bridge was built to access land cut off after a new section of canal was made. It is now home to many boat moorings, and popular with fishermen.

== Location ==
Bethells Bridge is located near the small hamlet of Hempholme. It crosses the Driffield Navigation between Struncheon Hill Lock to the south, and Emmotland to the north. A small lane from Brandesburton, passing through Burshill serves as the only public access to the bridge.

Situated on the Driffield Navigation

- Next place upstream = Emmotland
- Next place downstream = Struncheon Hill Lock

== History ==
During the navigation improvements of 1803–1811, a new lock cut was made to bypass a large meandering loop of the River Hull around Struncheon Hill. Mr Richard Bethell, who owned the Leven Canal, also owned the land around this cutting, and needed a bridge to access his land.

William Chapman, who carried out the works, decided on a swing bridge, as was in common use in the rest of the navigation, but since the cut was made wide to accommodate the flow of the river, a fixed section was used to reduce the size of the opening section.

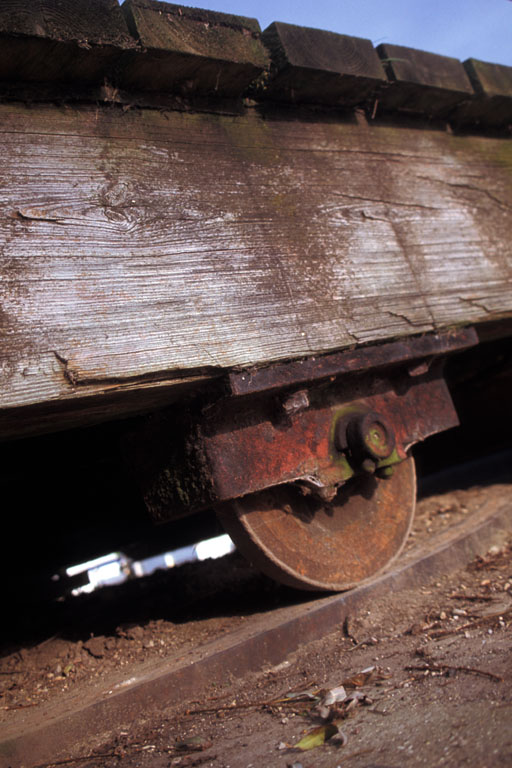
One of the original cast iron wheels before removal

A brick base, with a cast iron curved edge strip, was built. It rested on a cast iron pintel, with four wheels to steady the structure, which rested on a curved iron track. The main structure of the bridge was built from wood (probably oak), with steel bracing to hold the structure together. The hand rails were also built from wood, and had crisscross stays.

At the same time, a bridge-keepers house was built, presently known as Swing Bridge Cottage. When the traffic dropped on the Driffield Navigation, the bridge keeper was no longer needed and the house was left empty. In the early 1970s Colin Askin occupied the property, and restored and improved the house, raising his family there.

Without regular maintenance, the bridge started to deteriorate in the 1950s. The wood warped, and became inoperable some time in the late 1960s.

In 1978, on a cold December night, a large lorry crossed the bridge, and made it unsafe. As this bridge was a vital link for the milk lorry which served the farms, and also a short cut for other farm traffic the local farmers - Richard Southwell from Rotsea Carr farm, Mike and Ben Southwell from Hunts Hill farm (all brothers), and Mr Keith Conner from Struncheon Hill farm, along with Colin Askin and other members of the Driffield Navigation Amenities Association helped replace, and repair the structure.

Around that time, Bethells Bridge Boat Club was also founded, and had their first AGM in 1979. The BBBC used Ben Southwell's land along the bank above the bridge for moorings. In later years, other farmers started letting out moorings on their banks, so there are now many boats moored in the area.

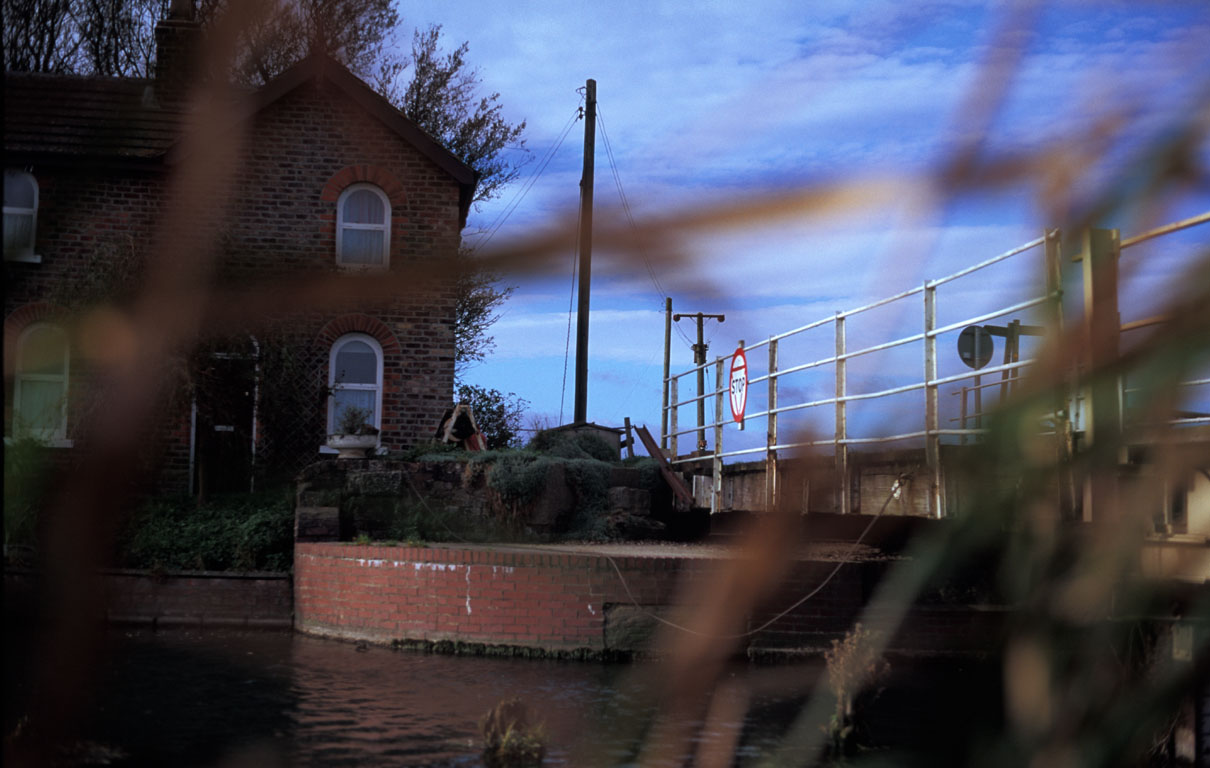
Looking across the bridge from the east bank

Further work was carried out on the structure by the DNAA in the early 1980s to improve the brickwork and structure of the bridge foundation. Further work was carried out on the fixed portion of the bridge in the later part of the 1980s, which replaced the handrails, and many of the bridge floor beams which were going rotten.

Driffield Navigation Trust, the current managers of the navigation decided that they had a claim on Swing Bridge Cottage. Colin Askin, who still lived there, could have claimed squatters rights, but since he believed in the restoration of the navigation moved out. It was being let to generate funds, but in 2017 was sold to private ownership.

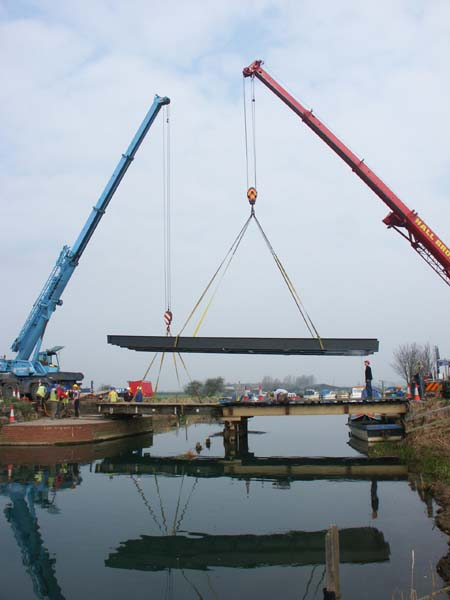
The new bridge is lifted into place

During the late 1990s the wooden fixed section was in need of attention. It was replaced with a steel structure, but kept the wooden decking.

In 2001?, a new steel bridge was built for Brigham Bridge. Unfortunately this was too small for the traffic that needed to go over it, and it sat in the construction yard for the next few years. In March 2003 this bridge was used to replace the complete structure, with a new fixed section decking made from steel, installed by Simpsons Civil Engineering of Driffield.

Access to the bridge for boaters became a problem after the bridge keeper was no more. There were no bridge moorings below or above the bridge, and often crew would need to be let off on the bridge base. In 2006 a landing stage was constructed by DNAA above the bridge to make it easier to operate.

The shaded waters of the bridge also attract shoals of perch and pike.

== See also ==
- Driffield Navigation
- Swing bridge
