= Foston on the Wolds =

Village and civil parish in the East Riding of Yorkshire, England

Coordinates: 53°59′08″N 0°19′25″W

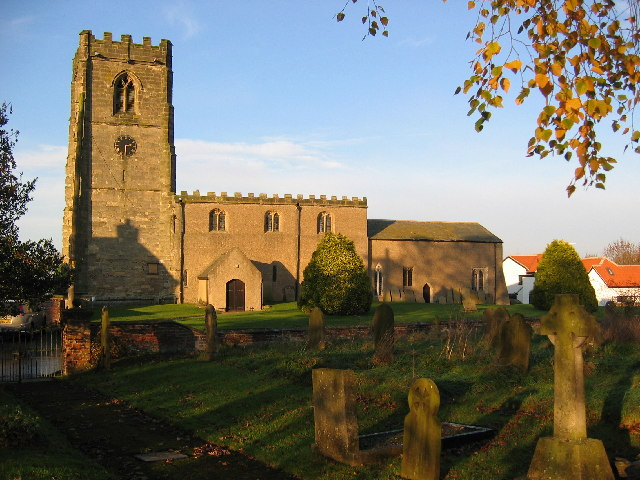
- St Andrew's Church, Foston on the Wolds

- Location within the East Riding of Yorkshire
- Population: 263 (2011 census)
- OS grid reference: TA101558
  - London: 170 mi (270 km) S
- Civil parish: Foston
- Unitary authority: East Riding of Yorkshire
- Ceremonial county: East Riding of Yorkshire
- Region: Yorkshire and the Humber
- Country: England
- Sovereign state: United Kingdom
- Post town: DRIFFIELD
- Postcode district: YO25
- Dialling code: 01262
- Police: Humberside
- Fire: Humberside
- Ambulance: Yorkshire
- UK Parliament: Bridlington and The Wolds

Foston on the Wolds is a village and civil parish in the East Riding of Yorkshire, England. It is situated approximately 8 miles (13 km) south-west of Bridlington town centre and 2 miles (3 km) north of the village of North Frodingham.

The civil parish is formed by the villages of Foston on the Wolds and Brigham and the hamlet of Gembling. According to the 2011 UK census, Foston parish had a population of 263, an increase on the 2001 UK census figure of 253.

In 1823 Foston inhabitants numbered 300. Occupations included ten farmers, two wheelwrights, two blacksmiths, two grocers who were also drapers, a coal dealer, a corn miller who was also a coal dealer, a boot & shoemaker, a butcher, a tailor, a tanner, and the landlady of the Cross Keys public house. Carriers operated between the village and Hull on Mondays and Thursdays, Driffield and Gembling on Thursdays, and Bridlington on Saturdays. In the village was a Methodist and a Calvinist chapel. The church at the time was dedicated to All Saints.

== History ==
The name Foston derives from the Old Norse personal name Fotr and the Old English tūn meaning 'settlement'. 'On the Wolds' refers to the village's position on chalk hills.

The village consists largely of a single road running in a north-east to south-west direction, with the buildings grouped on either side. The road continues to the south-west to Bridgham. To the north-east, the road splits into two, one road leading to the hamlet of Gembling, and a second road turning towards the south-east and then the south to reach Beeford. To the west of the village, Foston Beck runs along the western edge of the settlement, while Old Howe Drain runs along the eastern and then the southern edge. Both then turn to the south-west, and join at Frodingham Bridge, to become part of Frodingham Beck, once part of the Driffield Navigation.

Foston Beck provided a source of water for milling for centuries. A mill is known to have been in operation in 1086, and the mill pond may possibly have been created by diverting Kelk Beck during the period of Danish settlement. Kelk Beck now becomes Foston Beck near the village. A new mill was built on the site in 1747. The open fields around Foston were enclosed by act of parliament in 1780, and special provision was made for the miller. This allowed him to divert the beck into a drainage ditch to allow him to carry out repairs to the mill or to scour the beck. Sir William St Quintin, 5th Baronet, the son of Sir William St Quintin, 4th Baronet, bought the mill in 1792, and spent some £1,500 over the next four years on repairs and improvements. By the time he had finished, two water wheels drove four pairs of grinding stones. Equipment also included two flour cylinders, four bolting mills, two corn-screens, a fan and a corn-drying kiln. Access to the mill was possible by boat along Foston Beck from the Driffield Navigation. Water power was supplemented by a steam engine by 1854, the mill being one of only eleven in the county to be modernised in this way. It was also one of only four in the county to be fitted with rollers, which were used to produce fine white flour, of a quality which could not be produced by stones. The water wheels were subsequently replaced by a turbine, but the building burnt down in 1895–6. A new building was erected, and milling was recorded in 1925 and 1929. In 1970, the building was used by the adjacent farm, although it still contained a turbine.

Although the manufacture of cloth was not significant in the area following the decline of the Beverley industry in the thirteenth century, a fulling mill was recorded at Foston in 1565, and three fulling mills were later recorded there. In addition to water power, there is the stump of a windmill close to the water mill.

Foston was also the scene of development work following the passing of the Beverley and Barmston Drainage Act in 1798. In order to relieve flooding in the valley of the River Hull, water from the north of Foston, which formerly drained into the Hull, was diverted to a sea outfall at Barmston. In order to ensure that the water flowed in the opposite direction to the new outfall, various channels were made deeper, and a barrier was constructed at Foston, to prevent the water following its former course. Old Howe Lane, the road that runs from Foston to Beeford crosses the barrier, which is still labelled The Barrier on modern maps. The ditch to the north-east of the road flows northwards to the sea, and is called the Barmston Main Drain; that to the south-west is now the Old Howe Drain and flows to Frodingham Beck, the River Hull and the Humber to reach the sea.

Two buildings within the village have been listed as being of architectural merit. The first is St Andrew's Church, Foston on the Wolds, which has been Grade II* listed since 1966. It consists of a nave dating from the twelfth century, a chancel dating from the early thirteenth, and the west tower, which dates from the late fourteenth century. There are various other early features, including a twelfth century tub font and an effigy of a knight which has been defaced. Nearby is a medieval cubical sandstone cross base, which is also listed. The other listed building is the Mill House, which forms part of Mill Farm. It is an early nineteenth century brick structure, with a pantiled roof, consisting of two storeys and a basement.

On 1 April 1935 the parish of "Foston on the Wolds" was abolished and merged with Brigham to form a new "Foston" parish. In 1931 the old parish of "Foston on the Wolds" had a population of 202.

== See also ==
- Listed buildings in Foston on the Wolds

== Bibliography ==
- Allison, K. J. (1970). East Riding Water Mills (PDF). East Yorkshire Local History Society. Archived from the original (PDF) on 15 April 2015.
- Baines, Edward (2013) [1823]. History, Directory & Gazetteer of the County of York. ISBN 1-230-13914-1.
- Gazetteer — A–Z of Towns Villages and Hamlets. East Riding of Yorkshire Council. 2006. p. 5.
- Sheppard, June A. (1976) [1958]. The Draining of the Hull Valley. East Yorkshire Local History Society. ISBN 0-900349-08-5.
