= Struncheon Hill Lock =

Lock on the Driffield Navigation in Yorkshire

Coordinates: 53°56′2″N 0°21′25″W

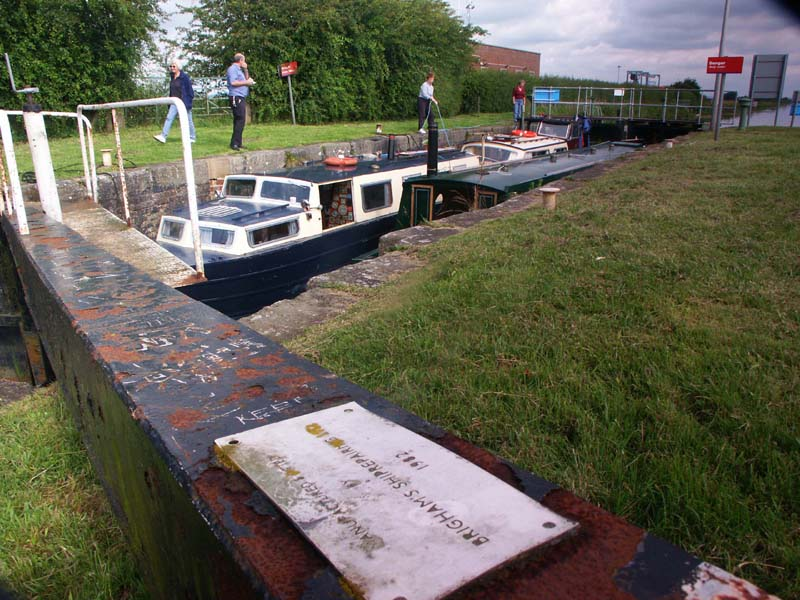
A full lock, thanks to the Bethells Bridge Boat Club

Struncheon Hill Lock was built as a later addition to the Driffield Navigation in the East Riding of Yorkshire, England. It improved access to the next section of water during low tide conditions where the navigation meets the tidal River Hull. It is sometimes known as "Top Hill Low", which is the name of the large pumping station located there.

== Location ==
Near the small hamlet of Hempholme, the lock is about 0.75-mile (1.21 km) south of Bethells Bridge. Access can be made by a footpath from Hempholme, or via the waterworks at Top Hill Low which is also a nature reserve.

Situated on the Driffield Navigation

- Next Place Upstream: Bethells Bridge
- Next Place Downstream: Wilfholme Landing

== History ==
During the navigation improvements of 1803–1811, a new lock cut was made to bypass a large meandering loop of the River Hull around Struncheon Hill.

William Chapman, who looked after the works, built the lock to the standard dimensions of the rest of the navigation – to take vessels 60 feet (18 m) long, by 14 feet 6 inches (4.42 m) wide. This is a standard known for Yorkshire Keels, however on further investigation it seems the lock was built to longer dimensions and in 2009 Michael Askin took a Royalty Class Narrow Boat Victoria of 71.5 feet (21.8 m) in length through the lock – though the boat would only fit pointing upstream due to low water levels not allowing enough depth over the top cill.

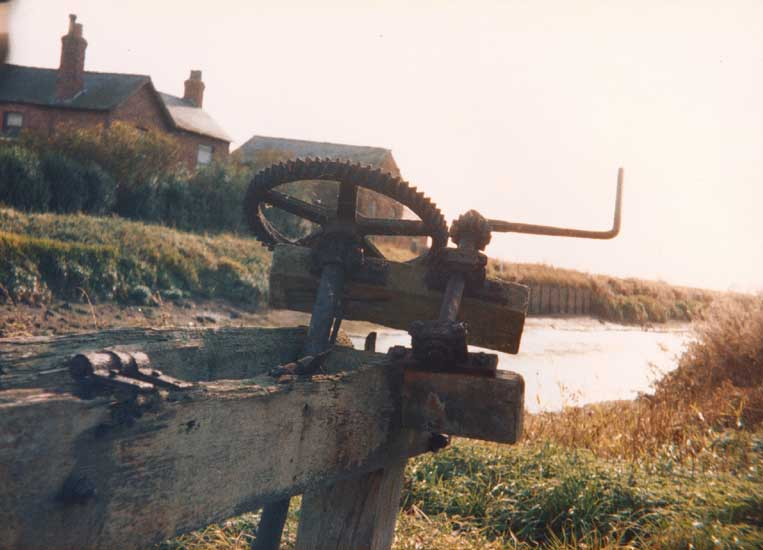
Lower chamber sluice, and behind, the pumping station

The lock was originally built as a single lock, but like Snakeholme lock, it was found that at low tides there was not enough depth to get over the bottom cill, so a second chamber was added. To empty the chamber a large hole through one lock wall, and a wooden sluice was used. The lower lock was filled by emptying the upper lock.

Originally made with oak gates, with handspike paddlegear, the top gates were replaced with unusual steel gates by Yorkshire Water, who looked after the navigation for drainage, and water supply. The gates instead of having balance beams to open them, had a complicated rack system which pulled them open with a windlass. The paddles were designed like weir sluices, and take many turns to open them.

A weir was built at the lock to control the river level. Around the same time the top gates were replaced the weir was replaced by an automatically controlled structure. There is a small building next to the weir which houses water level meter, and control systems for the weir. Originally it had a glass window, and it was possible to look in and see a paper roll on which the level was recorded. It has now been bricked up due to vandalism.

The weir is a noted fishing area, with a resident population of perch, gudgeon and pike.

The bottom gates were replaced in 1982 by the Driffield Navigation Amenities Association with steel ones, but these had balance beams. As a concession to cost, screw style paddles were used.

Just below the lock a steam powered pumping station was built to lift drain water to the river. The steam engine was replaced by diesels at some point, but the boilers were left in the structure. It was finally demolished in the later 1980s

== See also ==
- Driffield Navigation
- Canal lock
