= Gembling =

Hamlet in the East Riding of Yorkshire, England

Coordinates: 53.997982°N 0.309010°W

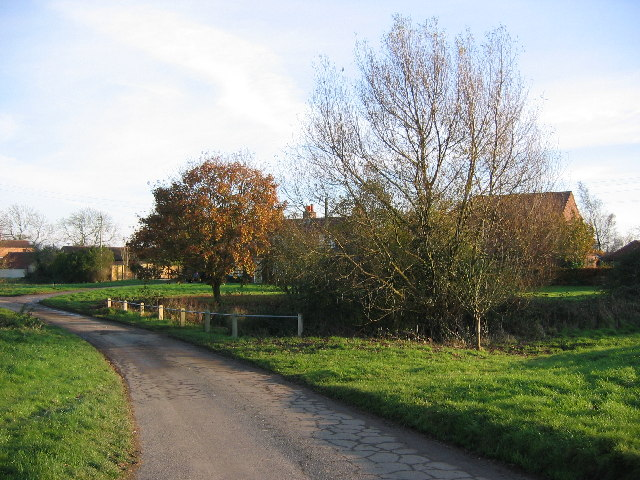

- Location within the East Riding of Yorkshire
- OS grid reference: TA109570
  - London: 170 mi (270 km) S
- Civil parish: Foston
- Unitary authority: East Riding of Yorkshire
- Ceremonial county: East Riding of Yorkshire
- Region: Yorkshire and the Humber
- Country: England
- Sovereign state: United Kingdom
- Post town: DRIFFIELD
- Postcode district: YO25
- Dialling code: 01262
- Police: Humberside
- Fire: Humberside
- Ambulance: Yorkshire
- UK Parliament: Bridlington and The Wolds

Gembling is a hamlet and former civil parish, now in the parish of Foston, in the East Riding of Yorkshire, England. It is situated approximately 8 miles (13 km) south-west from the coastal resort of Bridlington and 2.5 miles (4 km) north from the village of North Frodingham. In 1931 the parish had a population of 80.

== History ==
The name Gembling derives from the Old English Gemelaingas meaning 'the people of Gemela'.

In 1823 Gembling inhabitants numbered 87. Occupations included eight farmers and a carrier who operated between the hamlet and Hull on Thursdays and Foston on Fridays.

Gembling was formerly a township in the parish of Foston-on-the-Wold, from 1866 Gembling was a civil parish in its own right, on 1 April 1935 the parish was abolished and merged with Beeford.
