= Emmotland =

Hamlet in the East Riding of Yorkshire, England

Coordinates: 53.950702°N 0.347878°W

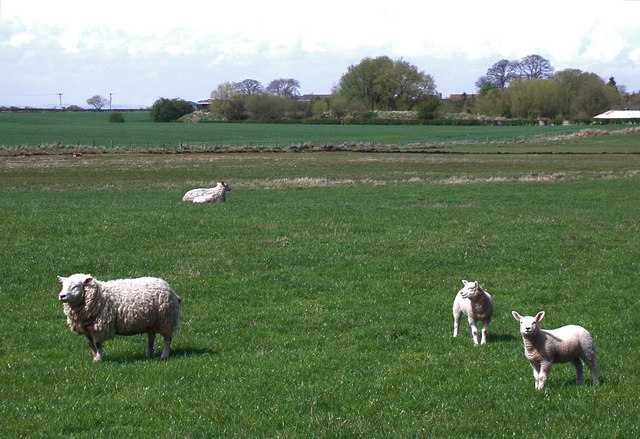
- Sheep grazing in Emmotland

- Location within the East Riding of Yorkshire
- OS grid reference: TA085517
  - London: 150 mi (240 km) S
- Civil parish: North Frodingham
- Unitary authority: East Riding of Yorkshire
- Ceremonial county: East Riding of Yorkshire
- Region: Yorkshire and the Humber
- Country: England
- Sovereign state: United Kingdom
- Post town: DRIFFIELD
- Postcode district: YO25
- Dialling code: 01262
- Police: Humberside
- Fire: Humberside
- Ambulance: Yorkshire
- UK Parliament: Bridlington and The Wolds

Emmotland is a small hamlet in the East Riding of Yorkshire, England. It forms part of the civil parish of North Frodingham.

The hamlet consists of two farms at the end of a small access road. West Beck joins the Driffield Navigation at Emmotland.

== History ==
When the Driffield Navigation was built, a towpath bridge was placed over the West Beck near the junction. This bridge disappeared before 1980.

One of the last acts of the Humberside County Council was to build a new footpath bridge over the West Beck. The bridge is a fixed structure, but has a high headroom. A mistake in the location of the bridge means that it lands on private property, and is dangerously close to the river. Since no further money is available the bridge has remained closed since its construction.

In 1823 Emmotland was in the parish of Frodingham and the Wapentake and Liberty of Holderness. Occupations at the time included two farmers.

== Location ==
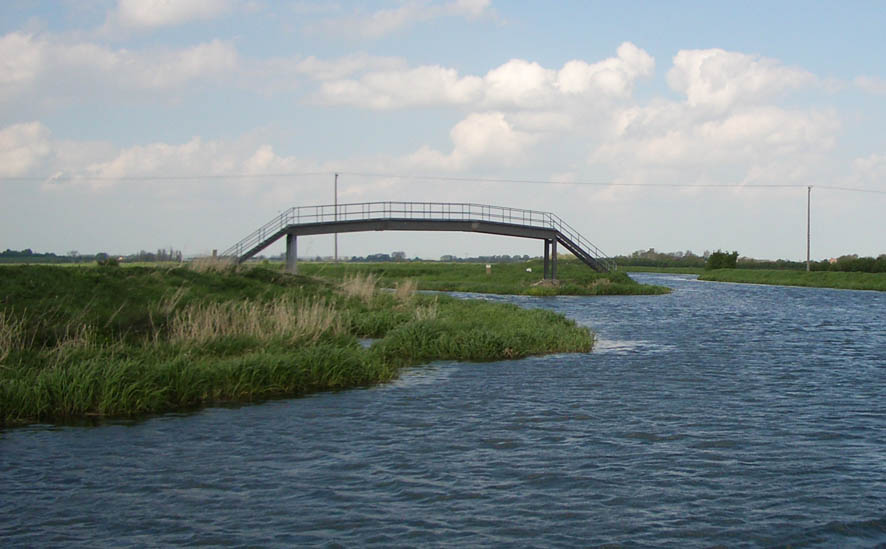
The footbridge across the West Beck (to the left)

Emmotland is situated approximately 1 mile (1.6 km) north of Hempholme, and 1.4 miles (2.3 km) south-west of North Frodingham, and is on the North Frodingham Carrs and the Holderness plain.

=== Position of Emmotland on the Driffield Navigation ===
- Next place upstream = Fisholme
- Next place downstream = Bethells Bridge
- Next place upstream on West Beck = Corpslanding
