= Listed buildings in Skerne and Wansford =

Skerne and Wansford is a civil parish in the county of the East Riding of Yorkshire, England. It contains 13 listed buildings that are recorded in the National Heritage List for England. Of these, one is listed at Grade I, the highest of the three grades, one is at Grade II*, the middle grade, and the others are at Grade II, the lowest grade. The parish contains the villages of Skerne and Wansford, and the surrounding countryside. The listed buildings consist of two churches, a lychgate and a former vicarage, three houses, three locks on the Driffield Canal, a water mill and farmhouse, a bridge, and a former school and schoolmaster's house.

== Key ==
Grade	Criteria
I	Buildings of exceptional interest, sometimes considered to be internationally important
II*	Particularly important buildings of more than special interest
II	Buildings of national importance and special interest

== Buildings ==
Name and location	Photograph	Date	Notes	Grade
St Leonard's Church, Skerne; 53.98154°N 0.40556°W		12th century	The church has been altered and extended through the centuries. It is built in stone, largely rendered, with flagstone dressings and slate roofs. The church consists of a nave, a south porch, a chancel with a north vestry, and a west tower. The tower has two stages, a moulded plinth, diagonal buttresses, chamfered string courses, a three-light west window with a hood mould, two-light bell openings, and an embattled parapet with corner obelisks. Inside the church, there are substantial Norman parts.	I
The Manor House; 53.99084°N 0.37969°W	—	Early 18th century	The house is in red brick, with stone dressings, a dentilled brick eaves cornice, and a pantile roof. There are two storeys and four bays. On the front is a Doric porch and a tripartite door, and to the left are two canted bay windows. To the right and on the upper floor are sash windows under cambered gauged brick arches.	II
Manor Farmhouse; 53.99092°N 0.38049°W		Mid-18th century	The house is in red brick, with a dentilled brick eaves cornice, and a pantile roof with raised coped gables. There are two storeys and an attic, three bays, and a rear outshut. The central doorway has an architrave and a rectangular fanlight, under a flat gauged brick arch. This is flanked by canted bay windows with stone slate roofs. The upper floor contains sash windows in architraves under flat gauged brick arches.	II
Pleasant Wood Farmhouse; 53.99873°N 0.38112°W		Mid-18th century	The house is in red and yellow brick with a hipped slate roof. There are two storeys and four bays. The doorway has a rectangular fanlight, the windows are sashes, and all the openings are under segmental heads.	II
Snakeholme Locks; 53.98397°N 0.37234°W		c. 1768	The locks on the Driffield Canal are in brick with gritstone dressings. They consist of two staircase locks with parallel sides to the chambers, which narrow to the gates.	II
Wansford Lock; 53.99078°N 0.38116°W		1770	The lock on the Driffield Canal is in brick with gritstone dressings. The lock basin is shaped and has a batter to the sides, and massive capstones.	II
Whinhill Lock; 53.99623°N 0.39659°W		1770	The lock on the Driffield Canal is in brick with gritstone dressings. The lock basin is shaped and has a batter to the sides, and massive capstones.	II
Wansford Mill and Mill Farmhouse; 53.99078°N 0.37733°W		Late 18th century	The watermill and farmhouse are in whitewashed brick with pantile roofs. The mill has two storeys and attics, a stepped brick eaves cornice, and an approximately square plan. It contains a doorway and windows. The farmhouse attached to the right has two storeys and three bays. The doorway and windows date from the 20th century, the ground floor windows with wedge lintels.	II
Wansford Bridge; 53.98926°N 0.37888°W		c. 1812	The bridge carries a road over the River Hull. It is in red brick with stone dressings, and consists of five round-headed arches, increasing in size towards the middle. The bridge has cutwaters, a band to the ramped bridge deck, and coped parapets and splays.	II
St Mary's Church, Wansford; 53.99504°N 0.38128°W		1868	The church, designed by G. E. Street, is in stone with a tile roof. It consists of a nave and a chancel in one, a south porch, and a north vestry. On the west end is a bellcote with a square lower stage and an octagonal broach spire. There are two-light bell openings, the shaft with volutes to the capital, under a gablet containing a round sound-hole. On the spire are two-light trefoil-headed lucarnes, a cross finial, and a weathercock.	II*
Lychgate and wall, St Mary's Church, Wansford; 53.99485°N 0.38088°W		1868	The lychgate and churchyard wall were designed by G. E. Street. The lychgate is timber framed on a triple-chamfered plinth, and has arc braces and a gabled tile roof. The low wall has shaped coping stones.	II
The Old Vicarage; 53.99533°N 0.38096°W	—	1872	The vicarage, later a private house, was designed by G. E. Street. It is in red brick, with stone dressings, and a tile roof with tumbled-in brick to the coped gables with kneelers. There are two storeys and an irregular plan, consisting of a main range, and a cross-wing with a gabled wing in the angle. The doorway is in a pointed recess, and it has a hood mould. The windows are mullioned with two, three and four lights, under relieving arches.	II
Former school, Wansford; 53.99567°N 0.38050°W		1877	The school and schoolmaster's house, later combined into one house, were designed by G. E. Street. It is in red brick, with stone dressings and a tile roof. There is an irregular plan, with four projecting gabled wing of differing sizes, the former house to the right and the school to the left and the rear. The windows include a mullioned window on the house, and a three-light window under a segmental head on the school. On the roof is a flèche with a cross finial.	II
