= Wansford =

Wansford may refer to the following places in England:

- Wansford, Cambridgeshire
  - Wansford railway station, headquarters of the Nene Valley Railway
- Wansford, East Riding of Yorkshire
