= Eske (disambiguation) =

Eske is a village in the East Riding of Yorkshire, England.

Eske may also refer to:

- River Eske, a river in Southwest County Donegal, Ireland
- Lough Eske, a lake in Southwest County Donegal, Ireland
