= Wansford Lock =

Historic lock in the East Riding of Yorkshire, England

Coordinates: 53.99082°N 0.38123°W

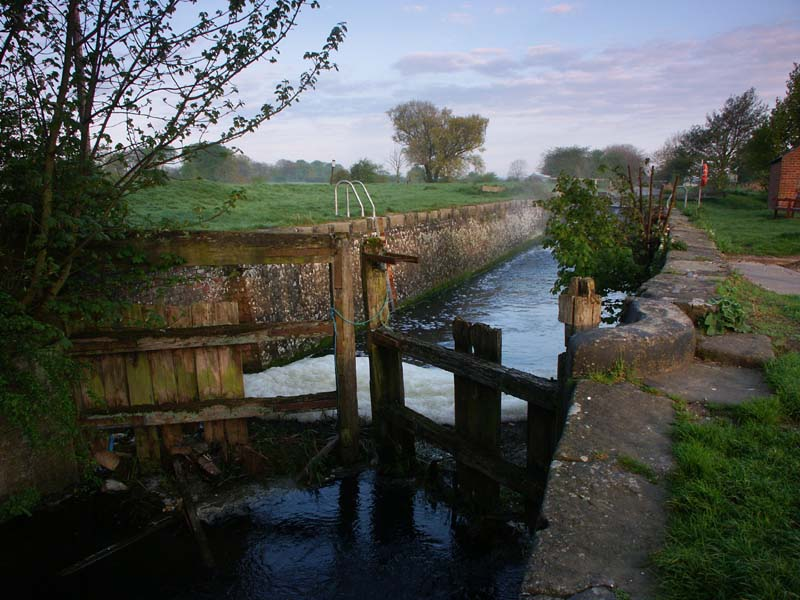
The remains of the bottom gates before restoration

Wansford Lock was built as part of the Driffield Navigation in the East Riding of Yorkshire, England. It was opened in 1770, and restored in 2009. It was designated Grade II in 1985.

== Location ==
In the village of Wansford, the lock is easily accessible from the B1249 road.

Situated on the Driffield Navigation

- Next Place Upstream: Whinhill Lock
- Next Place Downstream: Wansford Bridge

== History ==
The lock was built during the construction of the Driffield Navigation between 1767 and 1770. It was restored in two stages, the first of which involved the creation of a flood relief channel around the lock chamber, which was completed in Autumn 2008. New top and bottom gates were installed as part of the second phase, and the lock was officially opened on 4 July 2009. The funding for this project was provided by the Inland Waterways Association, the East Riding of Yorkshire Council, and Waste Recycling Environmental Limited (WREN), who give grants to organisations based near to landfill sites.

== See also ==
- Driffield Navigation
- Canal lock
