= Skerne, East Riding of Yorkshire =

Village in the East Riding of Yorkshire, England

Coordinates: 53.982703°N 0.407920°W

Skerne
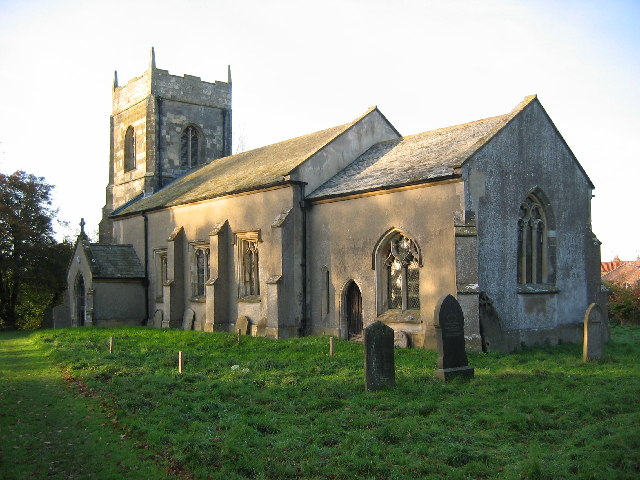
- Saint Leonard's Church, Skerne

- Location within the East Riding of Yorkshire
- OS grid reference: TA045552
  - London: 170 mi (270 km) S
- Civil parish: Skerne and Wansford
- Unitary authority: East Riding of Yorkshire
- Ceremonial county: East Riding of Yorkshire
- Region: Yorkshire and the Humber
- Country: England
- Sovereign state: United Kingdom
- Post town: DRIFFIELD
- Postcode district: YO25
- Dialling code: 01377
- Police: Humberside
- Fire: Humberside
- Ambulance: Yorkshire
- UK Parliament: Bridlington and The Wolds

Skerne is a village and former civil parish, now in the parish of Skerne and Wansford, in the East Riding of Yorkshire, England. The village is situated 1 mile (1.6 km) to the south of the River Hull and the Driffield Canal. It is approximately 2 miles (3 km) south-east from Driffield and 2 miles (3 km) north-east from Hutton Cranswick.

Skerne Grade I listed Anglican church is dedicated to St Leonard. The church is substantially Norman, particularly the nave, chancel and south doorway. The north aisle is 13th-century. The Perpendicular tower is ashlar faced. Three interior effigies, possibly, according to Pevsner, 12th- or 13th-century, are opposite the church door: a cross-legged knight holding a small shield, a woman shown within a quatrefoil, and between these a baby.

In 1823 Skerne inhabitants numbered 251. Occupations included eleven farmers, a tailor, a flax dresser who was also a corn miller, and the landlord of the Board public house.

In 1982 the Skerne sword was found in an archaeological excavation near the village.

Skerne public house, The Eagle, closed in 2004. It was one of only 11 left in the UK without a bar counter, and served beer through a set of cash register handpulls. Prior to that beer was drawn directly from the barrels in the cellar and brought up in enamel jugs. Planning permission was granted in 2011 for conversion to residential usage. The Eagle is Grade II listed by Historic England.

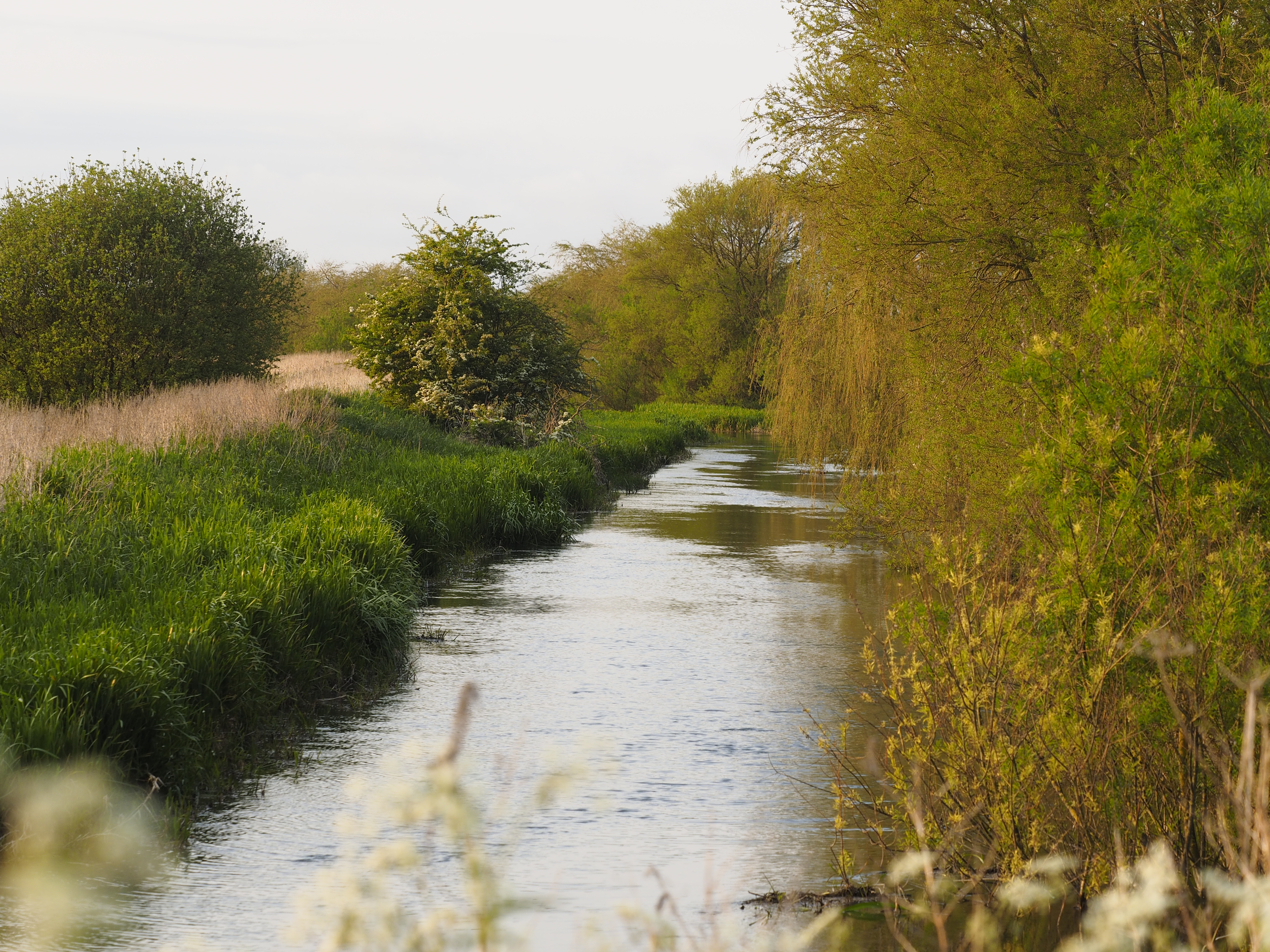
Skerne Wetlands

Skerne Wetlands is a Site of Special Scientific Interest (SSSI), and is the most northerly Chalk river in the UK.

== Governance ==
On 1 April 1935 the parish of Wansford was merged with Skerne, on 9 March 1979 the merged parish was renamed "Skerne & Wansford". In 1931 the parish of Skerne (prior to the merge) had a population of 203.

== See also ==
- Listed buildings in Skerne and Wansford
