= Whinhill Lock =

Canal lock in the East Riding of Yorkshire, England

Coordinates: 53.99681°N 0.39814°W

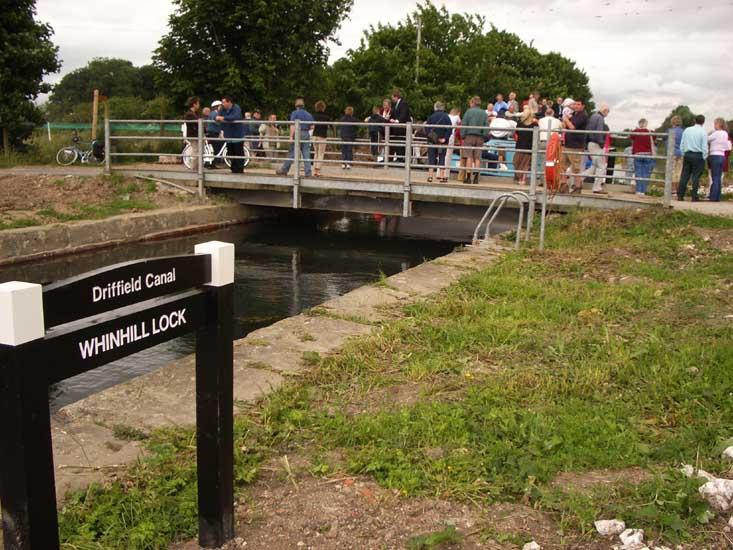
The partially restored lock during the opening ceremony

Whinhill Lock was built as part of the Driffield Navigation in the East Riding of Yorkshire, England. It was originally opened in 1770, and was restored in 2004.

== Location ==
Located between the village of Wansford and town of Driffield, the lock is easily accessible from the B1249 road.

Situated on the Driffield Navigation

- Next Place Upstream: Town Lock
- Next Place Downstream: Wansford Lock

== History ==
The lock was built during the construction of the Driffield Navigation between 1767 and 1770, and is a grade II listed structure. After the last traffic to Driffield stopped around 1945 the lock gradually fell into disrepair. In 1968 the Driffield Navigation Amenities Association started to restore and maintain the canal and its structures. Various "working parties" have been held at the lock over the years, to conserve the structure, but in 2004 a lottery grant was secured to restore and re-gate it.

The lock was reopened by the Mayor of Driffield Mrs Margaret Killin on 25 June 2005.

== See also ==
- Driffield Navigation
- Canal lock
