= Church End, East Riding of Yorkshire =

Hamlet in the East Riding of Yorkshire, England

Coordinates: 53.964746°N 0.339701°W

Church End
- Location within the East Riding of Yorkshire
- OS grid reference: TA090533
  - London: 170 mi (270 km) S
- Civil parish: North Frodingham
- Unitary authority: East Riding of Yorkshire
- Ceremonial county: East Riding of Yorkshire
- Region: Yorkshire and the Humber
- Country: England
- Sovereign state: United Kingdom
- Post town: DRIFFIELD
- Postcode district: YO25
- Dialling code: 01262
- Police: Humberside
- Fire: Humberside
- Ambulance: Yorkshire
- UK Parliament: Bridlington and The Wolds

Church End is a hamlet in the East Riding of Yorkshire, England. It is situated approximately 1 mile (1.6 km) west of the village of North Frodingham on the B1249 road.

It forms part of the civil parish of North Frodingham.

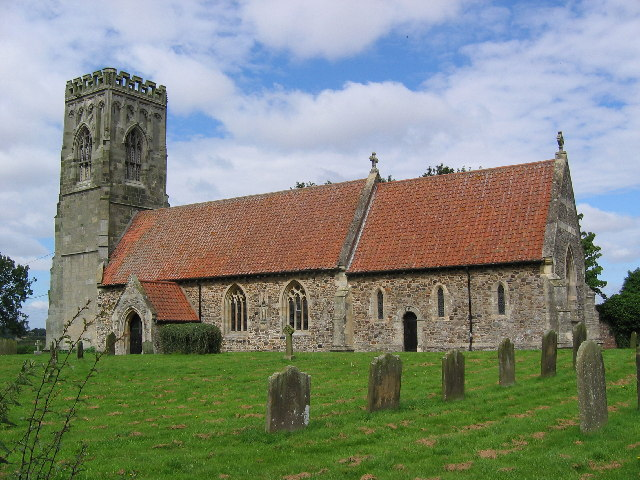
St Elgin's Church

The Grade II* listed church of St Elgin was restored in stages between 1877 and 1891 by Sir Tatton Sykes, 5th Baronet with the top part of the Perpendicular tower being designed by Temple Moor in 1892. It is on the Sykes Churches Trail devised by the East Yorkshire Churches Group.
