= St Andrew's Church, Foston on the Wolds =

Church in the East Riding of Yorkshire, England

Coordinates: 53°59′12″N 0°19′23″W

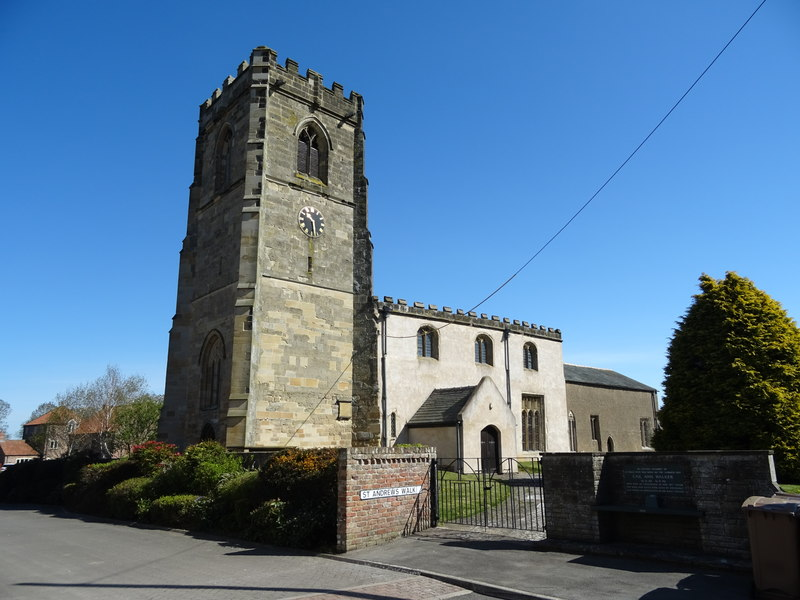
The church, in 2020

St Andrew's Church is the parish church of Foston on the Wolds, a village in the East Riding of Yorkshire, in England.

The church was built in the 12th century, from which period the nave survives. The chancel was constructed early in the 13th century, and the tower was added in the late 14th century. In 1886, the seating was replaced, with funding from Tatton Sykes. The church was grade II* listed in 1966.

The church is built of stone, the nave and chancel are roughcast, and the roof is slated. It consists of a nave with a clerestory, a north aisle, a south porch, a chancel and a west tower. The tower has three stages, a moulded plinth, moulded string courses, diagonal buttresses, and a pointed west doorway, over which is a three-light window with a hood mould. Above, there are two-light bell openings with hood moulds, and an embattled parapet. The nave also has an embattled parapet. The east window has four lights with Perpendicular tracery. Inside, there are three 13th-century sedilia, a 12th-century tub font, and a damaged effigy of a knight with crossed legs.

== See also ==
- Grade II* listed buildings in the East Riding of Yorkshire
- Listed buildings in Foston on the Wolds
