= Fisholme =

Location in the East Riding of Yorkshire, England

Coordinates: 53°57′33″N 0°21′5″W

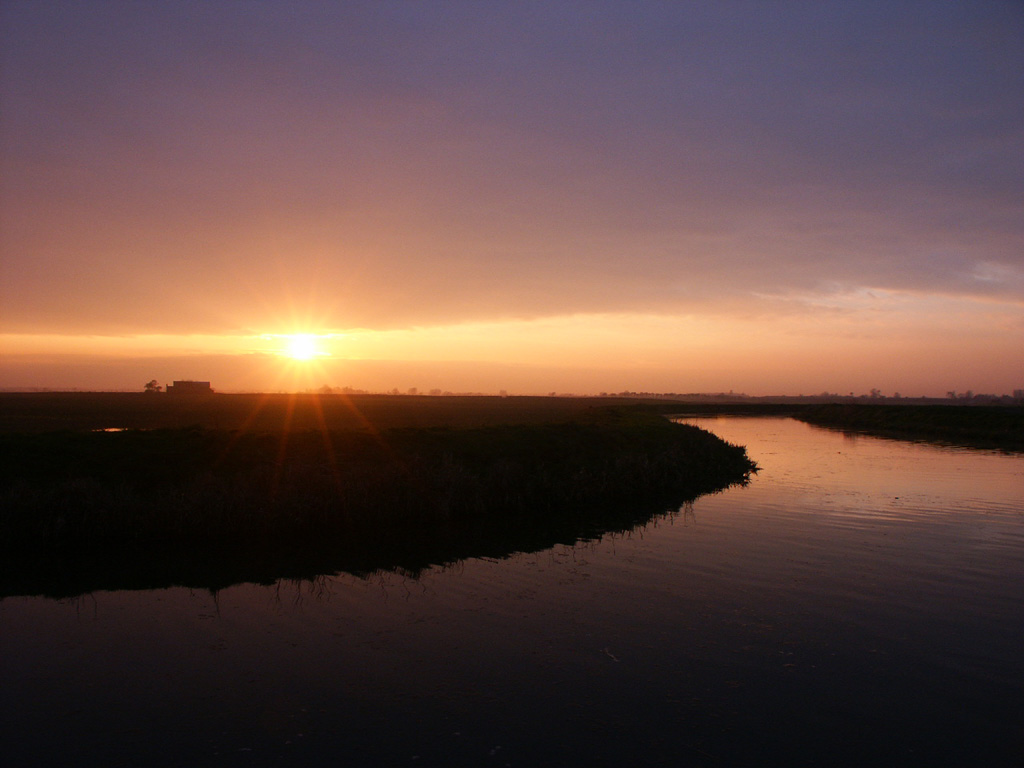
Looking across Fisholme from just downstream of the junction

Fisholme is a small area in the East Riding of Yorkshire, England that is situated between Brigham and Emmotland. The canal section of the Driffield Navigation leaves Frodingham Beck at this point. The name derives from Old English and means the water-meadow near where the fish were caught.

== Location ==
0.7 miles south-east of Brigham on the Holderness Plain.

=== Situated on the Driffield Navigation ===
- Next point upstream = Brigham
- Next point downstream = Emmotland
- Next point upstream on Frodingham Beck = Frodingham Landing

== History ==
There is a moat shown on the OS of the area, and a building called Fisholme Barn used by the Manor Farm, Brigham.

== See also ==
Driffield Navigation
