= Routh, East Riding of Yorkshire =

Village and civil parish in the East Riding of Yorkshire, England

Coordinates: 53.870025°N 0.344519°W

Routh
- Location within the East Riding of Yorkshire
- Population: 94 (2001 census)
- OS grid reference: TA089428
- Civil parish: Routh
- Unitary authority: East Riding of Yorkshire
- Ceremonial county: East Riding of Yorkshire
- Region: Yorkshire and the Humber
- Country: England
- Sovereign state: United Kingdom
- Post town: BEVERLEY
- Postcode district: HU17
- Dialling code: 01964
- Police: Humberside
- Fire: Humberside
- Ambulance: Yorkshire
- UK Parliament: Beverley and Holderness

Routh is a village and civil parish in the East Riding of Yorkshire, England. It is situated is approximately 4 miles (6.4 km) north-east of Beverley, lying on the A1035 road.

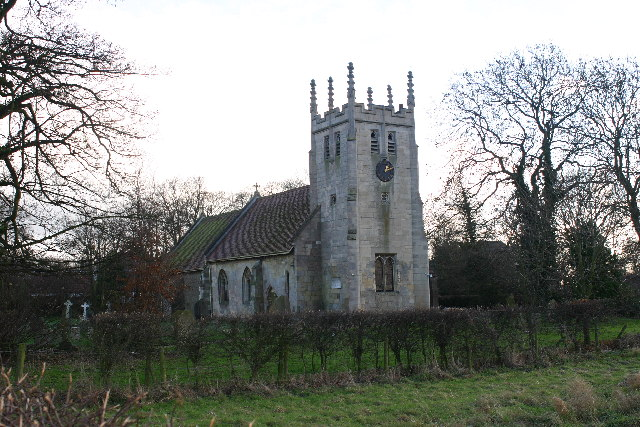
All Saints Church at Routh

According to the 2001 UK census, Routh parish had a population of 94.

The parish church of All Saints is a Grade II* listed building.

The name Routh derives from the Old Norse hrúðr meaning 'scurf', probably in reference to rough ground.

== Governance ==
Routh is represented locally by Tickton and Routh Parish Council a joint council with the adjacent parish of Tickton. while at county level is in the Beverley Rural ward of the East Riding of Yorkshire Council. At a parliamentary level it is part of the Beverley and Holderness constituency which is represented by Graham Stuart of the Conservative Party.
