= Brigham, East Riding of Yorkshire =

Village in the East Riding of Yorkshire, England

Coordinates: 53.968192°N 0.361517°W

Brigham
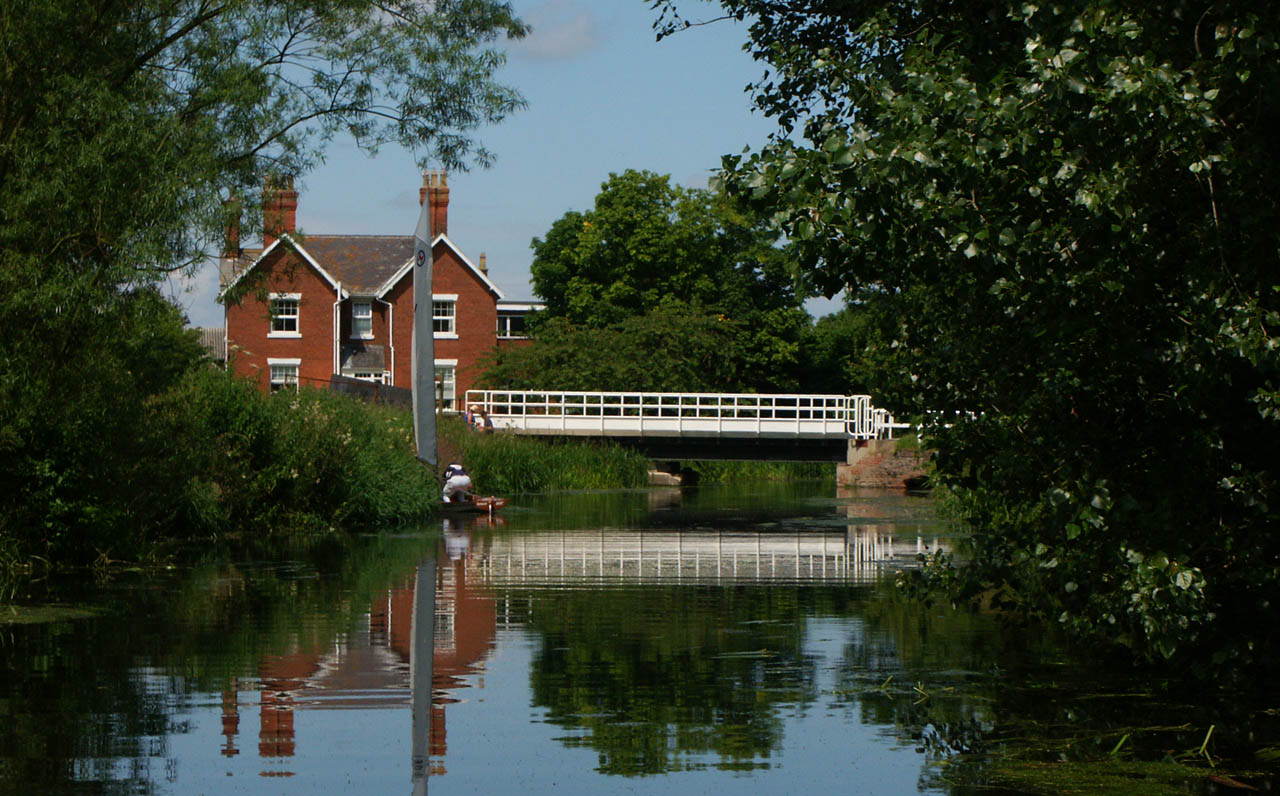
- Brigham Bridge

- Location within the East Riding of Yorkshire
- OS grid reference: TA075537
  - London: 170 mi (270 km) S
- Civil parish: Foston on the Wolds
- Unitary authority: East Riding of Yorkshire
- Ceremonial county: East Riding of Yorkshire
- Region: Yorkshire and the Humber
- Country: England
- Sovereign state: United Kingdom
- Post town: DRIFFIELD
- Postcode district: YO25
- Dialling code: 01262
- Police: Humberside
- Fire: Humberside
- Ambulance: Yorkshire
- UK Parliament: Bridlington and The Wolds

Brigham is a small village and former civil parish, now in the parish of Foston on the Wolds, in the East Riding of Yorkshire, England. It is situated approximately 4 miles (6 km) south-east from Driffield, 15 miles (24 km) north of Hull city centre, and to the west of the B1249 road. In 1931 the parish had a population of 66. Brigham was formerly a township in the parish of Foston on the Wolds, from 1866 Brigham was a civil parish in its own right, on 1 April 1935 the parish was abolished to form Foston.

The name Brigham derives from the Old English brycghām meaning 'bridge village'.

== Driffield Navigation ==
The Driffield Navigation canal passes at the west of the village. The Brigham section of the Driffield Navigation was dug about 1767. A swing bridge was built across the canal to allow access to Elm Tree Farm, and a footpath to Corpslanding and Hutton Cranswick. In 1967, after a decline in canal traffic, the swing bridge was kept closed, and was replaced by a fixed bridge in the 1970s. In 2003 a new working swing bridge was installed.

=== Brigham position on the Driffield Navigation ===
- Next location upstream - Snakeholme Lock
- Next location downstream - Fisholme

A village sailing club was established in 1928.
