= Listed buildings in North Frodingham =

North Frodingham is a civil parish in the county of the East Riding of Yorkshire, England. It contains three listed buildings that are recorded in the National Heritage List for England. Of these, one is listed at Grade II*, the middle of the three grades, and the others are at Grade II, the lowest grade. The parish contains the village of North Frodingham and the surrounding area, and the listed buildings consist of a church, a farmhouse and a market cross.

== Key ==
Grade	Criteria
II*	Particularly important buildings of more than special interest
II	Buildings of national importance and special interest

== Buildings ==
Name and location	Photograph	Date	Notes	Grade
St Elgin's Church; 53.96536°N 0.340301°W		15th century	The oldest part of the church is the tower, the body of the church was largely rebuilt in 1887–78 by Hugh Roumieu Gough, and the top part of the tower was added in 1891–92 by Temple Moore. The tower is built in stone, the rest of the church in cobbles with freestone dressings, and the roof is in pantile. The church consists of a nave, a south porch, a north aisle, a chancel and a west tower. The tower has three stages, a chamfered plinth, diagonal buttresses, chamfered string courses, a three-light pointed west window over which is a hood mould and a niche containing a figure, three-light bell openings with hood moulds, and brick arcading under a pierced embattled parapet.	II*
Church End Farmhouse; 53.96555°N 0.33991°W	—	1619	The house is in stone and some brick, on a high chamfered plinth, with quoins and a pantile roof. There are two storeys and an L-shaped plan, with a front range of two bays. The west front has two massive chimney breasts, between which is a window with a moulded floating cornice, and on the gable end is a similar window, above which is a datestone.	II
Market Cross; 53.96263°N 0.33015°W		1811	The cross, in the centre of a road junction, is in sandstone. It consists of a square tapering pillar on a stepped flagstone plinth, with chamfered arrises and a domed cap.	II
