= Snakeholme Lock =

Canal lock in the East Riding of Yorkshire, England

Coordinates: 53°59′3″N 0°22′21″W

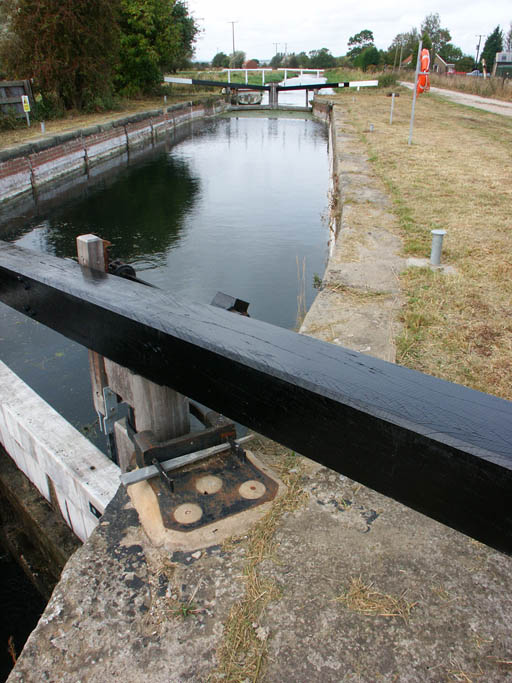
Snakeholme lock, restored after many years of closure

Snakeholme Lock is a brick chamber canal lock on the Driffield Navigation, in the East Riding of Yorkshire, England. It is notable in being a staircase lock, but only the upper lock is still used. It was designated Grade II in 1986.

== Location ==
It is 0.5 mile (0.8 km) south-east from the village of Wansford, and is approximately 17 miles (27 km) north of Kingston upon Hull city centre.

=== Situated on the Driffield Navigation ===
- Next location upstream = Wansford Bridge
- Next location downstream = Brigham

== History ==
Built during the construction of the Driffield Navigation after the act of parliament in 1767. It was the first lock reached on the new section of canal, and became the tidal limit on the navigation. A swing bridge reached over the bottom of the lock to allow the Yorkshire Keels to get through without lowering the mast.

Once regular trade started to use the new navigation, problems with low water were noticed. The tide on the River Hull does not easily push up the river due to sharp bends, and narrow sections, and so there was regularly not enough depth over the bottom gate cill.

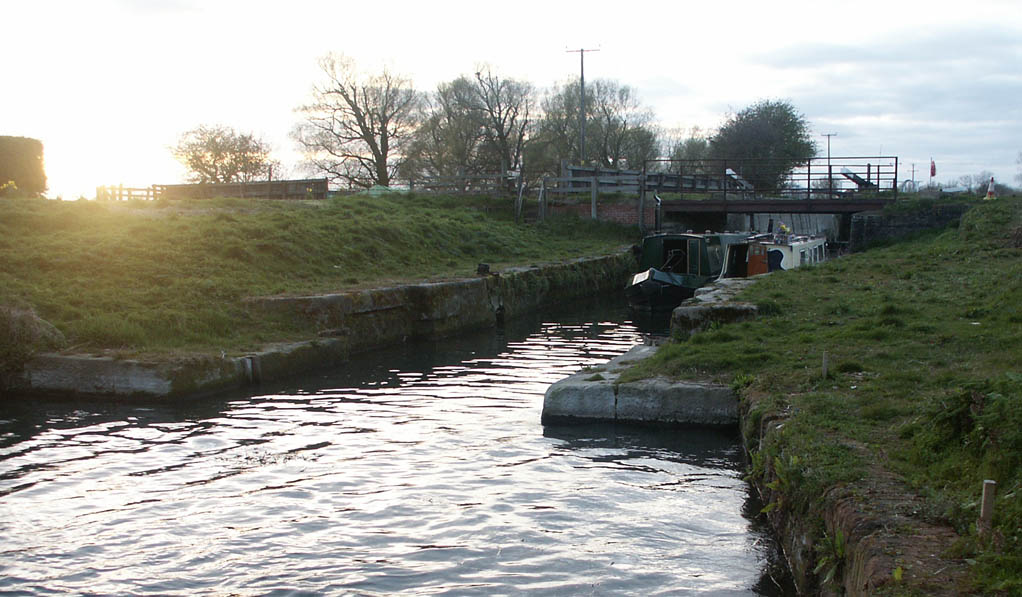
Lower chamber of the staircase

To remedy this situation, a new chamber was built below the lock creating a staircase lock. Since the lock was only needed to get the boats over the lower cill, the bottom lock only had a minimum rise, and would not even be needed on good spring tides, or during high river flows. A sluice was built into the side of the chamber to allow emptying, filling being performed from the lock above.

During the navigation improvements of 1803–1811, a new lock at Struncheon Hill was built, keeping a permanent high water level at the lock, and it would be unlikely the lower chamber was used after this.

Trade declined on the navigation, but some of the last cargoes were to the mills at Wansford, and so kept the lock going for a few more years than the rest of the canal. In 1967 a trip to the lock showed it unnavigable, but in reasonable condition.

At some point the swing bridge was replaced with a fixed structure.

Occasional working parties by the Driffield Navigation Ammeninties Association kept the worst of the vegetation at bay through the 1980s, but it was only in 2002 that a grant allowed work to restore the structure back to working conditions. When the lock was drained, the original swing bridge turntable casting was found in the mud and saved for historical interest.

On 18 April 2003, the lock was reopened to traffic by the Mayor of Driffield. Several boats made the trip to "The Trout" pub in Wansford, but large amounts of silt and a trout farm located just above the lock have limited the numbers of boats using this stretch. The paddles on the top gate are currently locked up to stop misuse.

== See also ==
- Canals of the United Kingdom
- History of the British canal system
