= St Elgin's Church, North Frodingham =

Church in the East Riding of Yorkshire, England

Coordinates: 53°57′55″N 0°20′25″W

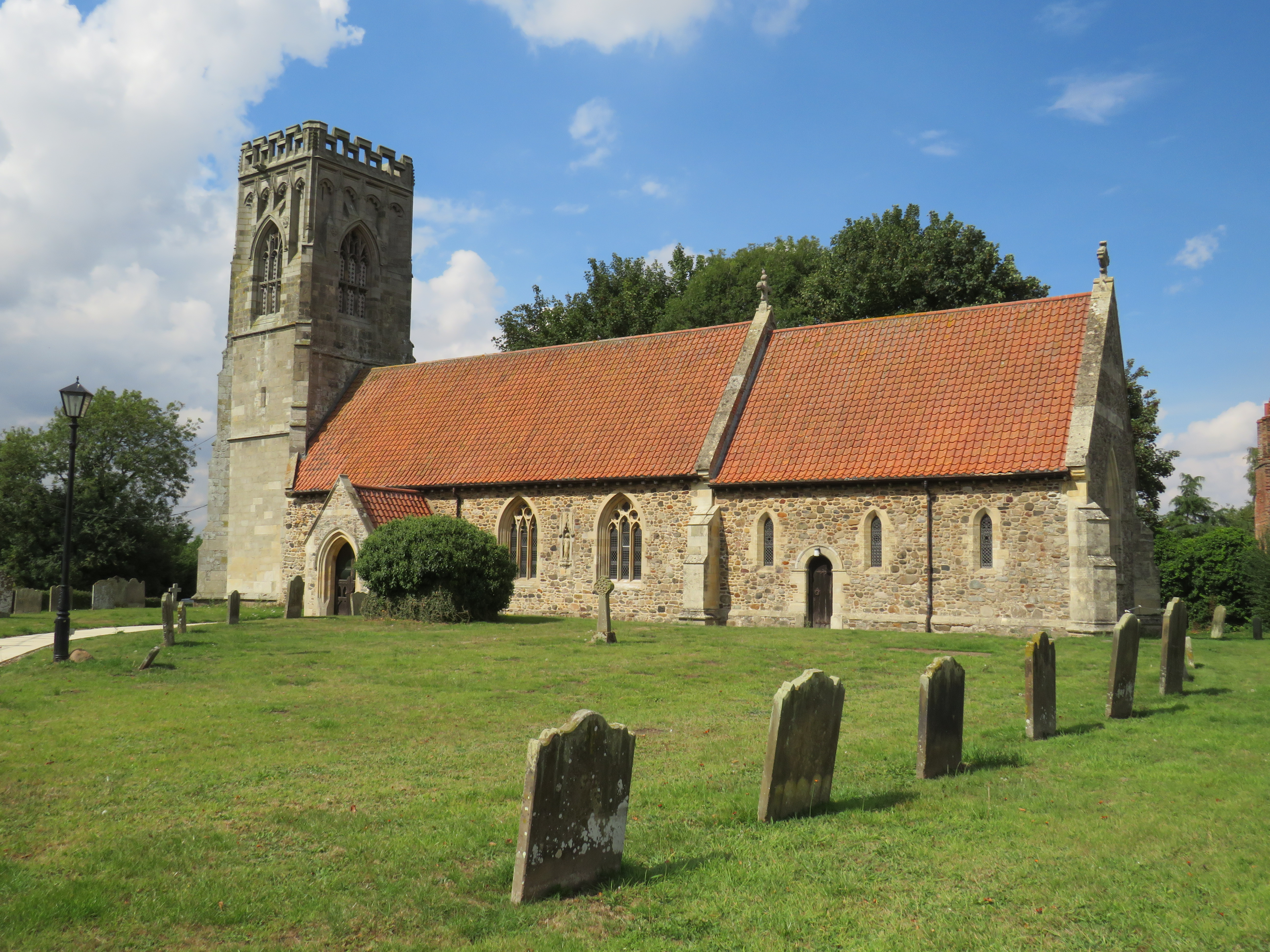
The church, in 2022

St Elgin's Church is the parish church of North Frodingham, a village in the East Riding of Yorkshire, in England.

A church was recorded in North Frodingham in the Domesday Book. The oldest part of the current building is the tower, which was constructed in the 15th century. The remainder of the church was largely demolished and rebuilt in 1878, to a design by Hugh Roumieu Gough. In 1892, a belfry was added to the tower, designed by Temple Moore. The building was grade II* listed in 1966. In the 16th century, the church was recorded as being dedicated to Saint Helen, but in 1700 it was wrongly recorded as dedicated to a "Saint Elgin" and, despite no saint of this name being known, that dedication has remained.

The tower is built of stone, the rest of the church in cobbles with freestone dressings, and the roof is in pantile. The church consists of a nave, a south porch, a north aisle, a chancel and a west tower. The tower has three stages, a chamfered plinth, diagonal buttresses, chamfered string courses, a three-light pointed west window over which is a hood mould and a niche containing a figure, three-light bell openings with hood moulds, and brick arcading under a pierced embattled parapet. Inside, there is a fragment of a 10th-century cross, and a carving of Atlas, of unknown date.

== See also ==
- Grade II* listed buildings in the East Riding of Yorkshire
- Listed buildings in North Frodingham
