= Hull Bridge =

Village in the East Riding of Yorkshire, England

Coordinates: 53.860806°N 0.397117°W

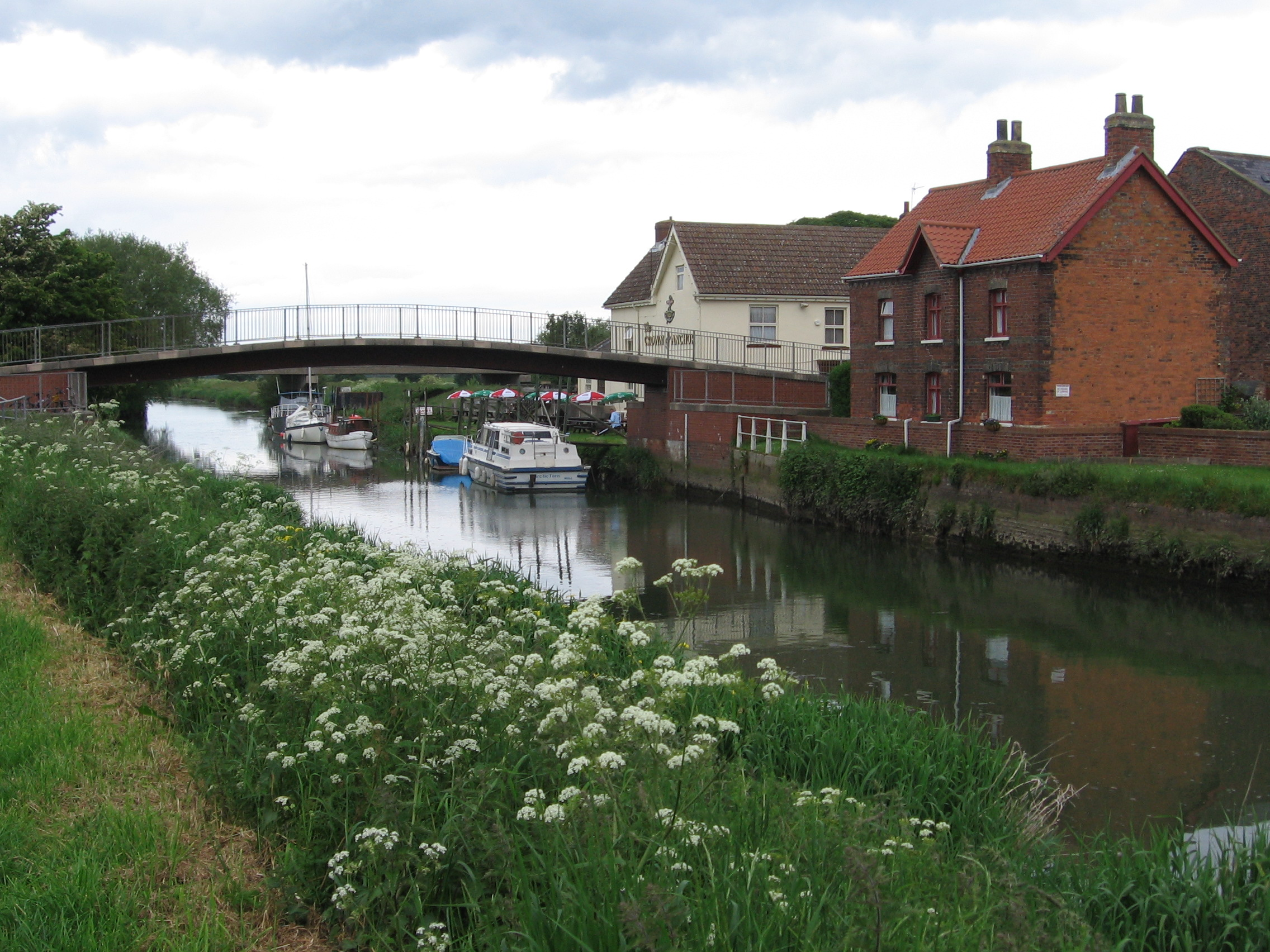
- River Hull at Hull Bridge

- Location within the East Riding of Yorkshire
- OS grid reference: TA055417
  - London: 160 mi (260 km) S
- Civil parish: Tickton
- Unitary authority: East Riding of Yorkshire
- Ceremonial county: East Riding of Yorkshire
- Region: Yorkshire and the Humber
- Country: England
- Sovereign state: United Kingdom
- Post town: BEVERLEY
- Postcode district: HU17
- Dialling code: 01964
- Police: Humberside
- Fire: Humberside
- Ambulance: Yorkshire
- UK Parliament: Beverley and Holderness

Hull Bridge is a village in the East Riding of Yorkshire, England. It is situated approximately 1.5 miles (2.4 km) north-east of Beverley town centre. It lies south of the A1035 road and straddles the Beverley and Barmston Drain and the River Hull from which it takes its name.

It forms part of the civil parish of Tickton.

== Bridge ==
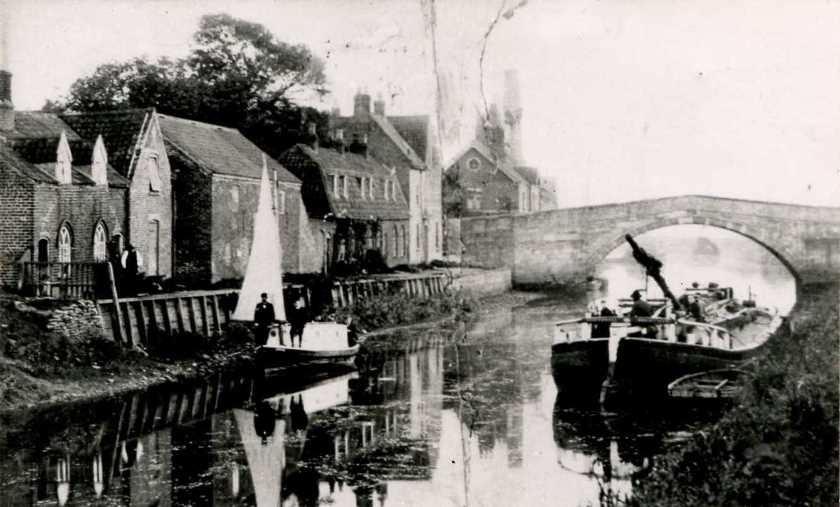
View of the River Hull at Hull Bridge around 1900.

The bridge over the river was the cause of a long-running disagreement between the commissioners of the Driffield Navigation and Beverley Corporation. The small opening in the stone structure restricted boats wanting to proceed up-river to the Driffield Navigation, and the commissioners attempted to obtain powers to replace it in 1777, but were thwarted by Beverley Corporation, who thought that a swing bridge would make access from the town to Holderness more difficult. In November 1799, the commissioners met to consider ways "for avoiding the very great losses, injuries and inconveniences sustained by this Navigation, from the stoppage of the Vessels (using the said Navigation) at Hull Bridge." Despite Beverley saying that they would never alter the bridge, an agreement was eventually reached in 1801, and powers were obtained in July in section 17 of the Hull and Frodingham Beck Navigation Act 1801 (41 Geo. 3. (U.K.) c. cxxxiv) to complete the work. Half of the cost of £500 was paid by Richard Bethell, the owner of the Leven Canal, on the understanding that tolls for passing under the bridge would be reduced, and the new crossing was completed by April 1804.

In 1913, the new bridge was demolished by the county council, who installed a steel rolling bridge in its place. Once the Tickton Bypass bridge had been built a short distance upstream, it no longer needed to carry road traffic, and it was replaced by a footbridge in 1976.

== See also ==
- Listed buildings in Tickton
