= Listed buildings in Foston on the Wolds =

Foston on the Wolds is a civil parish in the county of the East Riding of Yorkshire, England. It contains three listed buildings that are recorded in the National Heritage List for England. Of these, one is listed at Grade II*, the middle of the three grades, and the others are at Grade II, the lowest grade. The parish contains villages, including Foston, and the surrounding countryside, and the listed buildings consist of a church, a cross base in the churchyard, and a house.

== Key ==
Grade	Criteria
II*	Particularly important buildings of more than special interest
II	Buildings of national importance and special interest

== Buildings ==
Name and location	Photograph	Date	Notes	Grade
St Andrew's Church; 53.98672°N 0.32292°W		12th century	The church has been altered and extended through the centuries. It is in stone, the nave and chancel are roughcast, and the roof is slated. The church consists of a nave with a clerestory, a north aisle, a south porch, a chancel and a west tower. The tower has three stages, a moulded plinth, moulded string courses, diagonal buttresses, and a pointed west doorway, over which is a three-light window with a hood mould. Above, there are two-light bell openings with hood moulds, and an embattled parapet. The nave also has an embattled parapet. The east window has four lights with Perpendicular tracery.	II*
Cross base 53.98677°N 0.32259°W	—	Medieval (probable)	The cross base is in the churchyard of St Andrew's Church, to the east of the church. It is in sandstone, and consists of a cubical block with chamfered base and cap, with a central squared socket for the cross shaft.	II
Mill Farmhouse; 53.97805°N 0.33397°W		Early 19th century	The house is in whitewashed brick, with a dentilled eaves cornice and a pantile roof. There are two storeys and a basement, and three bays. Steps lead up to the central doorway with a fanlight, in a round-arched recess with imposts. Above the doorway is a sash window, and the other windows are tripartite, all under flat brick arches.	II
