= Weel =

Hamlet in the East Riding of Yorkshire, England

Coordinates: 53.840372°N 0.384903°W

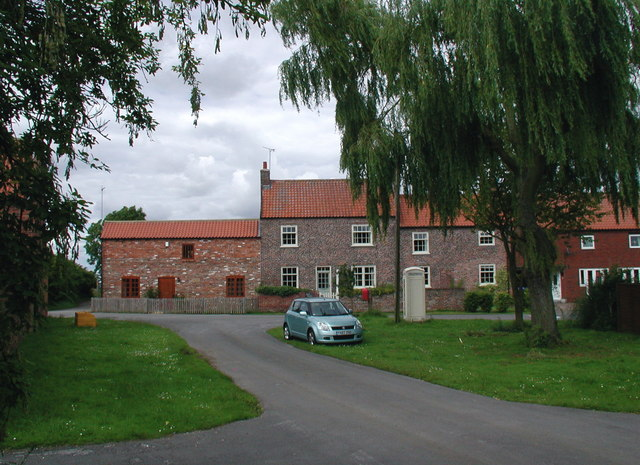

- Location within the East Riding of Yorkshire
- OS grid reference: TA063394
- Civil parish: Tickton
- Unitary authority: East Riding of Yorkshire
- Ceremonial county: East Riding of Yorkshire
- Region: Yorkshire and the Humber
- Country: England
- Sovereign state: United Kingdom
- Post town: BEVERLEY
- Postcode district: HU17
- Dialling code: 01964
- Police: Humberside
- Fire: Humberside
- Ambulance: Yorkshire
- UK Parliament: Beverley and Holderness

Weel is a hamlet and former civil parish, now in the parish of Tickton, in the East Riding of Yorkshire, England. It is situated approximately 2 miles (3.2 km) east of the town of Beverley and 1.5 miles (2.4 km) south of the village of Tickton. It lies on the east bank of the River Hull. In 1931 the parish had a population of 114. The name Weel derives from the Old English wēl meaning 'deep water' or 'whirlpool'.

Telephone services are provided by KCOM and in 2013, a superfast fibre optic broadband service was made available.

== Governance ==
Weel was formerly a township in the parish of Beverley-St. John. In 1866 Weel became a civil parish, and on 1 April 1935 the parish was abolished and merged with Tickton.

== See also ==
- Listed buildings in Tickton
