= Listed buildings in Tickton =

Tickton is a civil parish in the county of the East Riding of Yorkshire, England. It contains four listed buildings that are recorded in the National Heritage List for England. Of these, one is listed at Grade II*, the middle of the three grades, and the others are at Grade II, the lowest grade. The parish contains the villages of Tickton and Hull Bridge, the hamlets of Eske and Weel, and the surrounding countryside, and the listed buildings consist of houses, one converted into a hotel, and an office.

== Key ==
Grade	Criteria
II*	Particularly important buildings of more than special interest
II	Buildings of national importance and special interest

== Buildings ==
Name and location	Photograph	Date	Notes	Grade
Eske Manor; 53.87456°N 0.39324°W	—	c. 1680	The house is in red brick, with a floor band, an eaves cornice, and pantile roofs. There are two storeys, four bays, and a single-bay wing on the right. On the front is a two-storey porch containing a doorway with a segmental arch, moulded imposts and a projecting keystone, above which is a moulded band, and a low pediment. The upper floor has a small sash window, over which is a rubbed brick Lombard frieze under a dentilled brick cornice and a coped gable containing a painting of a mullion window, and a cornice. Elsewhere, there are paired sash windows under flat gauged brick arches. The wing has a band and tumbled-in brick to the plain close verges.	II*
Chapel Farmhouse; 53.84093°N 0.38471°W		Early to mid-18th century	The house is in red brick, and it has a pantile roof with tumbled-in brick to the raised gables. There are two storeys and three bays, and a lower two-storey two-bay extension to the right. The central doorway has a fanlight and the windows are sashes, all under segmental brick arches.	II
Hull Bridge Mills; 53.86079°N 0.39675°W		Mid-18th century	The office is in brown brick, with a dentilled brick eaves cornice, and a pantile roof with raised coped gables on shaped kneelers. There are two storeys and three bays. On the right bay is a Doric doorcase, and the windows are sashes under flat gauged brick arches.	II
Tickton Grange; 53.86555°N 0.37204°W		1790s	A house that has been extended and converted into a hotel, it is in colourwashed brick, on a plinth, with stuccoed quoins, a low parapet with urns on the corners, and a hipped slate roof. There are two storeys and two bays, and a lower two-storey single-bay recessed on the left. On the front are two canted bay windows under lead roofs, and on the upper floor are sash windows under wedge lintels. On the left bay is an infilled Tuscan porch, and above it is a sash window and a low parapet with an urn.	II
