= Skerne and Wansford =

Civil parish in the East Riding of Yorkshire, England

Coordinates: 53°44.5′N 0°25′W

- Civil parish
- Population: 345 (2011 census)
- OS grid reference: TA060553
- Civil parish: Skerne and Wansford
- Unitary authority: East Riding of Yorkshire
- Ceremonial county: East Riding of Yorkshire
- Region: Yorkshire and the Humber
- Country: England
- Sovereign state: United Kingdom
- Post town: DRIFFIELD
- Postcode district: YO25
- Police: Humberside
- Fire: Humberside
- Ambulance: Yorkshire
- UK Parliament: Bridlington and The Wolds

Skerne and Wansford is a civil parish in the East Riding of Yorkshire, England. It is situated approximately 2 miles (3.2 km) south-east of the town of Driffield and covering an area of 1,493.224 hectares (3,689.84 acres).

The civil parish is formed by the villages of Skerne and Wansford.

According to the 2011 UK census, Skerne and Wansford parish had a population of 345, an increase on the 2001 UK census figure of 318.

== See also ==
- Listed buildings in Skerne and Wansford
