= Skerne sword =

The Skerne sword is a Viking age sword found in the River Hull at Skerne, East Riding of Yorkshire, England. It dates to the 10th century AD.

== Discovery and description ==
The sword was found in an excavation by the Humberside Archaeology Unit in 1982 at a site near Skerne. The sword was interpreted as having been dropped into the River Hull from a structure like a jetty or bridge. The excavation found the wooden piles of a Viking bridge, built of oak, alongside other deposits including four knives, part of a spoon, an adze, and several animal skeletons.

The Skerne sword is a pattern-welded iron sword. It is inlaid with geometric designs in silver and copper wires on the hilt and was found within its scabbard. The sword can be categorised as of Petersen's Type X.

The deposition of the sword has been regarded as a pagan ritual deposit into the water and highlights the importance of bridges in providing access to such ritual space.

=== Public display ===
The sword was exhibited at a meeting of the Society of Antiquaries of London on 5 May 1983. It is in the collection of Hull and East Riding Museum.
