= Eske =

Hamlet in the East Riding of Yorkshire, England

Coordinates: 53.876813°N 0.390876°W

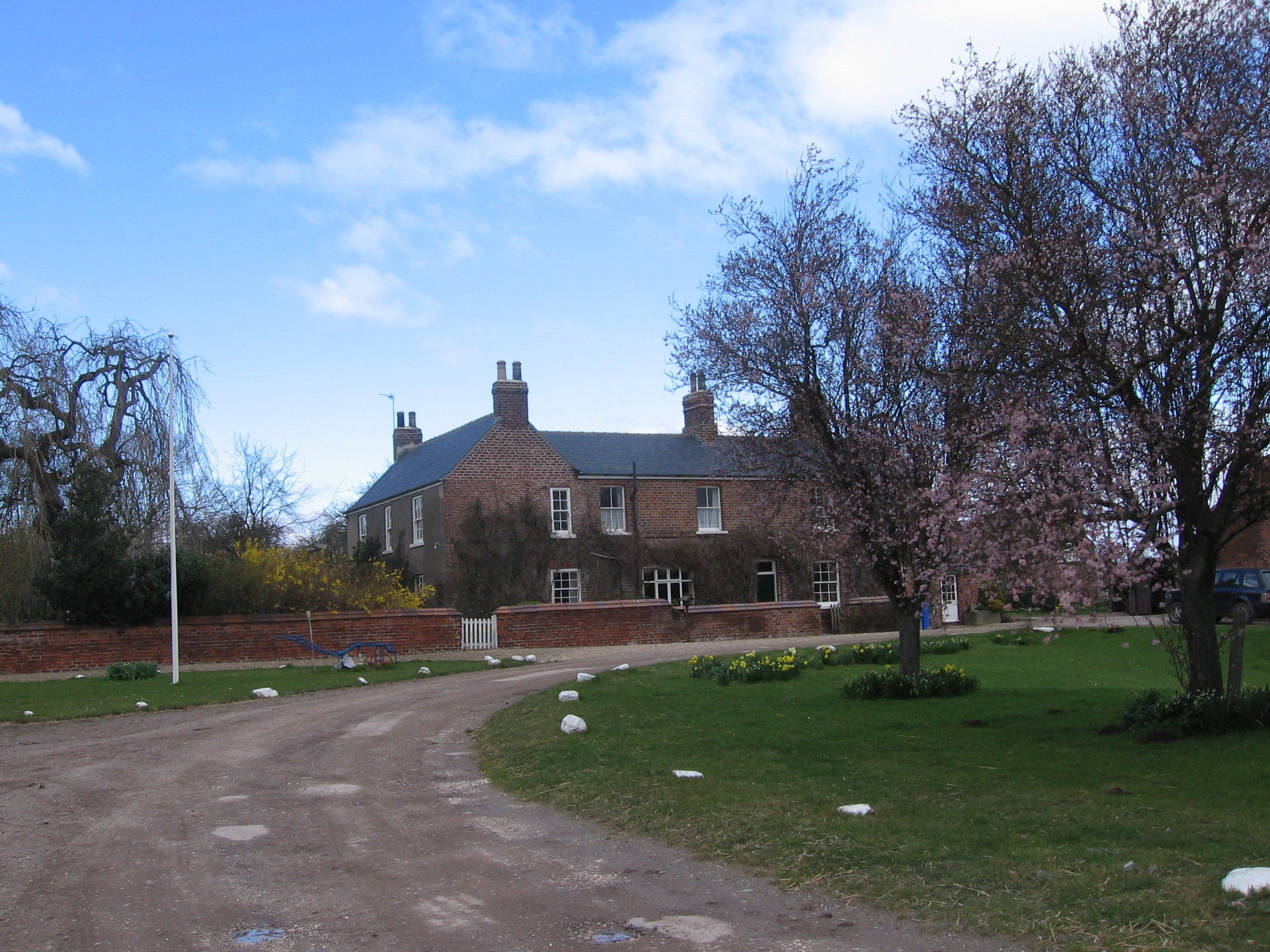
- View of High Eske

- Location within the East Riding of Yorkshire
- OS grid reference: TA058434
  - London: 160 mi (260 km) S
- Civil parish: Tickton
- Unitary authority: East Riding of Yorkshire
- Ceremonial county: East Riding of Yorkshire
- Region: Yorkshire and the Humber
- Country: England
- Sovereign state: United Kingdom
- Post town: BEVERLEY
- Postcode district: HU17
- Dialling code: 01964
- Police: Humberside
- Fire: Humberside
- Ambulance: Yorkshire
- UK Parliament: Beverley and Holderness

Eske is a hamlet in the civil parish of Tickton, in the East Riding of Yorkshire, England. It is situated approximately 3 miles (5 km) north-east of the town of Beverley and 1 mile (1.6 km) north of the village of Tickton. It lies just to the east of the River Hull.

The name Eske derives from the Old English æsc and the Old Norse eski meaning 'ash tree'.

Eske was the ancestral home of the Jackson family, beginning with Richard (1505?–1555). His great-grandson, Sir Anthony Jackson II was a prominent courtier with both Charles I and Charles II Stuart, and is interred at the Temple Church of the Inner Temple in London.

Eske was formerly a township in the parish of Beverley, in 1866 Eske became a separate civil parish, on 1 April 1935 the parish was abolished to form Tickton. In 1931 the parish had a population of 52.

Eske Manor is a mid-17th-century house that was designated a Grade II* listed building in 1987 and is now recorded in the National Heritage List for England, maintained by Historic England.

== See also ==
- Listed buildings in Tickton
