= Tickton =

Village and civil parish in the East Riding of Yorkshire, England

Coordinates: 53.862629°N 0.382221°W

- Location within the East Riding of Yorkshire
- Population: 1,731 (2011 census)
- OS grid reference: TA064419
- Civil parish: Tickton
- Unitary authority: East Riding of Yorkshire
- Ceremonial county: East Riding of Yorkshire
- Region: Yorkshire and the Humber
- Country: England
- Sovereign state: United Kingdom
- Post town: BEVERLEY
- Postcode district: HU17
- Dialling code: 01964
- Police: Humberside
- Fire: Humberside
- Ambulance: Yorkshire
- UK Parliament: Beverley and Holderness

Tickton is a village and civil parish in the East Riding of Yorkshire, England. Tickton is approximately 2 miles (3.2 km) east from Beverley, lying to the south of the A1035 road. The village is about 1 mile (1.6 km) long and contains two churches, two pubs, a primary school and a village shop which also serves as a post office.

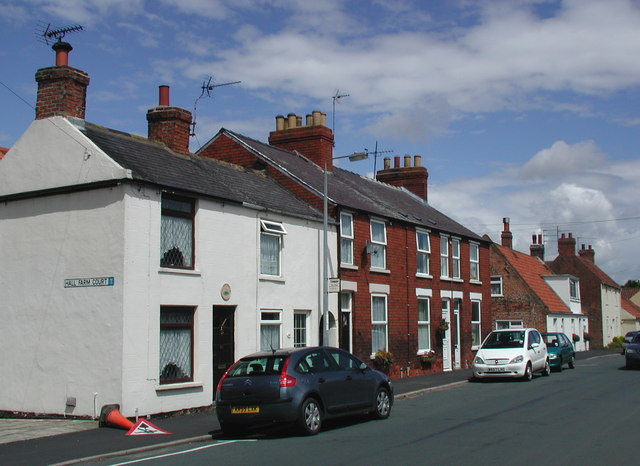
Tickton Main Street

The civil parish consists of the villages of Tickton and Hull Bridge together with the hamlets of Eske and Weel. According to the 2011 UK census, Tickton parish had a population of 1,731, an increase on the 2001 UK census figure of 1,586.

The place-name 'Tickton' is first attested in the Domesday Book of 1086, where it appears as Tichetone. The name means 'Tica's homestead or village'.

== Governance ==
Tickton is represented locally by Tickton and Routh Parish Council, a joint council with the adjacent parish of Routh. It is within the Beverley Rural ward of the East Riding of Yorkshire Council. At the parliamentary level it is part of Beverley and Holderness, currently represented by Graham Stuart of the Conservative Party.

== Media ==
In 2015 107.8 Beverley FM was launched. This is a station specifically for the community in Beverley and all of its surrounding areas, including Tickton.

== Infrastructure ==
In February 2023, a regional internet service provider, Connexin, installed notices on lampposts around the village, informing residents of plans to erect new telegraph poles along several streets. In a parish council meeting held later in the month, residents complained the poles would be an "eyesore" not worth the promise of faster and cheaper broadband.

== Notable people ==
- Kyle Edmund (1995-), tennis player, grew up in Tickton.

== See also ==
- Listed buildings in Tickton
