= Hempholme =

Hamlet in the East Riding of Yorkshire, England

Coordinates: 53.938391°N 0.341677°W

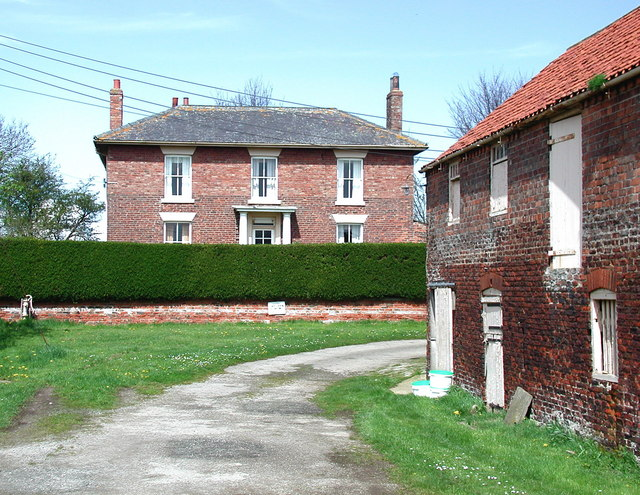
- Haverham Farm

- Location within the East Riding of Yorkshire
- OS grid reference: TA089504
  - London: 165 mi (266 km) S
- Civil parish: Brandesburton
- Unitary authority: East Riding of Yorkshire
- Ceremonial county: East Riding of Yorkshire
- Region: Yorkshire and the Humber
- Country: England
- Sovereign state: United Kingdom
- Post town: DRIFFIELD
- Postcode district: YO25
- Dialling code: 01964
- Police: Humberside
- Fire: Humberside
- Ambulance: Yorkshire
- UK Parliament: Bridlington and The Wolds

Hempholme is a hamlet in the civil parish of Brandesburton, in Holderness, in the East Riding of Yorkshire, England. It is situated approximately 8 miles (13 km) north-east of Beverley town centre, and 1 mile (1.6 km) east of the Driffield Navigation.

== History ==
The name Hempholme derives from the Old English hænep meaning 'hemp' and the Old Norse holmr meaning 'island'.

In 1823 Hempholme was in the civil parish of Leven, and the wapentake and liberty of Holderness. Population at the time was 93. Occupations at the time included six farmers, some of whom were yeomen, and a schoolmaster.

The reputed Manor of Hempholme, measuring 823 acres (333 ha), was Crown land from before 1750 until sold in 1866 for £22,875. It was leased out until 1835. From 1845 until 1865, Steward of the Manor of Hempholme was one of the sinecures used to effect resignation from the British House of Commons, similar to the current Steward of the Manor of Northstead.

== Governance ==
The civil parish was in the Beverley and Holderness parliamentary constituency until the 2010 general election when it was transferred to the constituency of East Yorkshire. As a result of the 2023 Periodic Review of Westminster constituencies, it was transferred to the new Bridlington and The Wolds parliamentary constituency from the 2024 general election.

Hempholme was formerly a township in the parish of Leven, in 1866 Hempholme became a separate civil parish, on 1 April 1935 the parish was abolished and merged with Brandesburton. In 1931 the parish had a population of 69.
