= North Frodingham =

Village and civil parish in the East Riding of Yorkshire, England

Coordinates: 53°57′47″N 0°19′27″W

- Location within the East Riding of Yorkshire
- Population: 830 (2011 census)
- OS grid reference: TA101531
  - London: 170 mi (270 km) S
- Civil parish: North Frodingham
- Unitary authority: East Riding of Yorkshire
- Ceremonial county: East Riding of Yorkshire
- Region: Yorkshire and the Humber
- Country: England
- Sovereign state: United Kingdom
- Post town: DRIFFIELD
- Postcode district: YO25
- Dialling code: 01262
- Police: Humberside
- Fire: Humberside
- Ambulance: Yorkshire
- UK Parliament: Bridlington and The Wolds

North Frodingham is a village and civil parish in the East Riding of Yorkshire, England. It is situated approximately 5.5 miles (9 km) south-east of the town of Driffield and lies on the B1249 road.

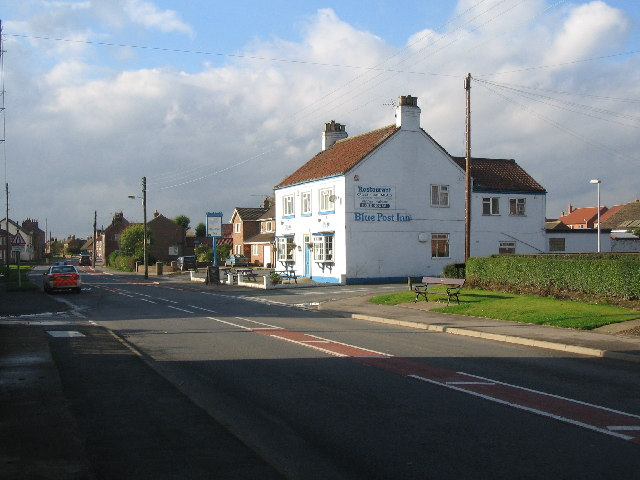
North Frodingham

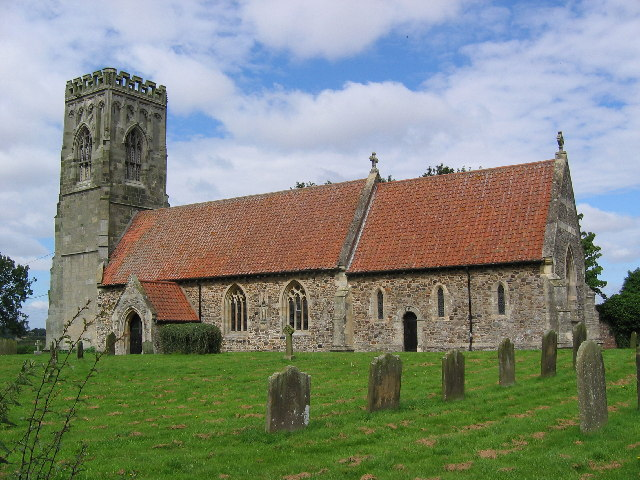
St Elgin's church, North Frodingham

The civil parish is formed by the village of North Frodingham and the hamlets of Church End and Emmotland. According to the 2011 UK census, North Frodingham parish had a population of 830, an increase on the 2001 UK census figure of 712.

The name Frodingham derives from the Old English Frodaingashām or Frodainghām, meaning 'settlement of Froda's people' or 'settlement at Froda's place'.

The Grade II* listed church of St Elgin's Church, North Frodingham was restored in stages between 1877 and 1891 by Sir Tatton Sykes, 5th Baronet with the top part of the perpendicular tower being designed by Temple Moore in 1892. It is on the Sykes Churches Trail devised by the East Yorkshire Churches Group.

In 1901 there was a proposal to construct a railway terminus as part of the North Holderness Light Railway, but despite appearing on the North Eastern Railway's tile maps at various stations (including Beverley), the line was never constructed. The Old Howe and North Frodingham beck join to the west of the village. The landing was used until the 1950s for unloading coal transported from Kingston upon Hull.

In 1823 North Frodingham was a town and civil parish in the Wapentake and Liberty of Holderness. Baines states that a town market was in disuse because of falling population, its charter having been transferred to the more successful town of Driffield in the 1860s. There were three chapels; one for Methodists, one for Independents, and one for Ranters. Population at the time was 575, including that of Emmotland. Occupations included twenty-two farmers, three blacksmiths, three grocers, one of whom was also a draper, three shoemakers, two tailors, two wheelwrights, two bricklayers, a weaver, a twine maker, a straw hat manufacturer, a plumber & glazier, a book keeper, a schoolmaster, and the landlords of The Red Line, The Star Inn, and The Gate public houses. Two carriers operated between the town and Driffield, and Beverley, once a week. Once a fortnight a further carrier linked North Frodingham by water to Hull.

North Frodingham has one public house, the Blue Post Inn. There is a small park overlooking a social centre. The village is surrounded by fields and farms.

The village has a bus stop, but the public transportation options in the area are limited, so most people travel by car. There used to be a shop; however, it has now closed.

== See also ==
- Listed buildings in North Frodingham
