= Wansford, East Riding of Yorkshire =

Village in the East Riding of Yorkshire, England

Coordinates: 53.993089°N 0.381286°W

Wansford
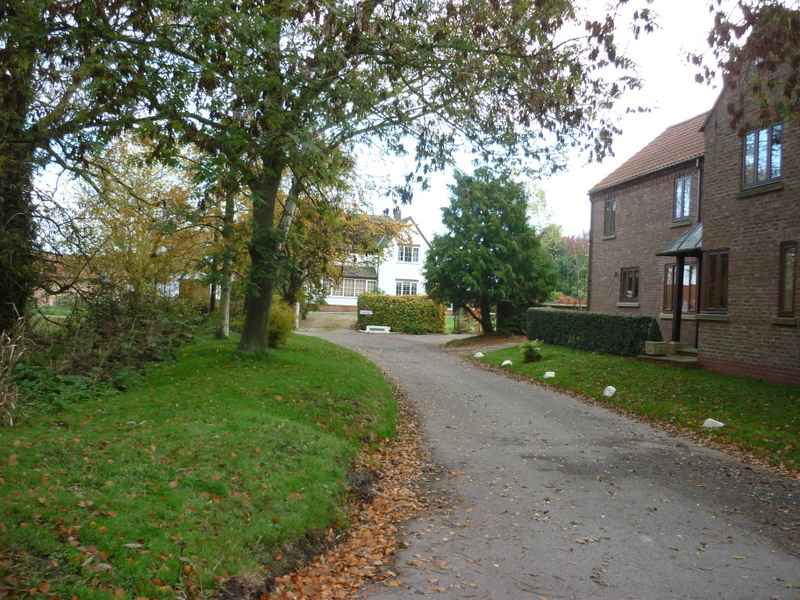
- Chapel Lane

- Location within the East Riding of Yorkshire
- OS grid reference: TA062564
- Civil parish: Skerne and Wansford
- Unitary authority: East Riding of Yorkshire
- Ceremonial county: East Riding of Yorkshire
- Region: Yorkshire and the Humber
- Country: England
- Sovereign state: United Kingdom
- Post town: DRIFFIELD
- Postcode district: YO25
- Dialling code: 01377
- Police: Humberside
- Fire: Humberside
- Ambulance: Yorkshire
- UK Parliament: Bridlington and The Wolds

Wansford is a village and former civil parish, now in the parish of Skerne and Wansford, in the East Riding of Yorkshire, England. It is situated on the B1249 road and just to the north of the River Hull and the Driffield Canal. It is approximately 2.5 miles (4 km) south-east of Driffield and 3 miles (4.8 km) north-west of North Frodingham.

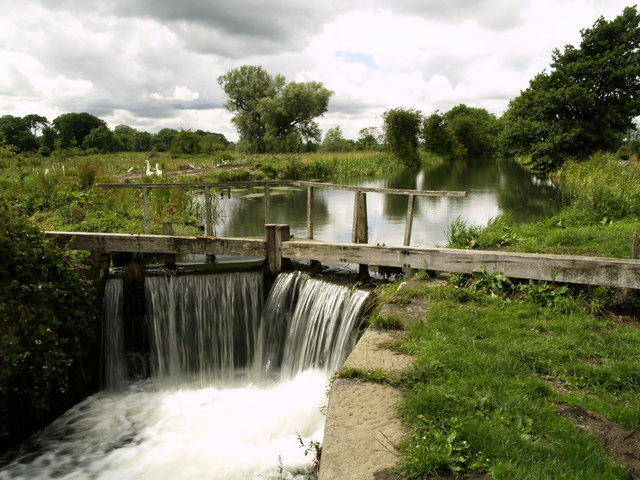
A lock gate on the Driffield Canal at Wansford

The church of St Mary the Virgin, Wansford was built in 1866–68 to designs by G.E. Street. It is on the Sykes Churches Trail devised by the East Yorkshire Churches Group. The church was designated a Grade II* listed building in 1966 and is now recorded in the National Heritage List for England, maintained by Historic England. In 1931 the parish had a population of 142.

The name Wansford derives from the Old English Wandsford or Wandelsford, meaning 'Wand/Wandel's ford'.

== Governance ==
Wansford was formerly a township in the parish of Nafferton, in 1866 Wansford became a civil parish, on 1 April 1935 the parish was abolished and merged with Skerne.

== See also ==
- Listed buildings in Skerne and Wansford
