= Driffield Navigation =

Waterway in Yorkshire, England

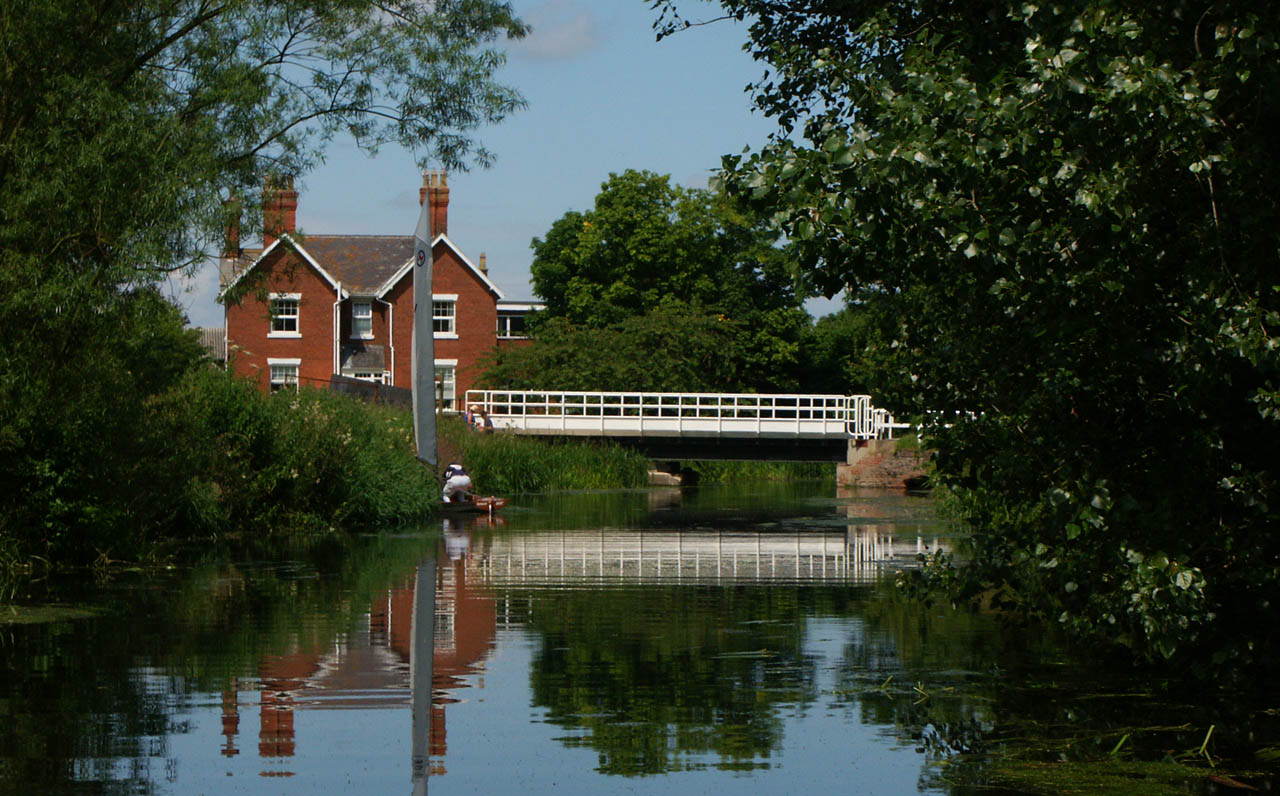
- The restored swing bridge at Brigham
- Interactive map of Driffield Navigation

Specifications
- Length: 11 miles (18 km)
- Maximum boat length: 61 ft 0 in (18.59 m)
- Maximum boat beam: 14 ft 6 in (4.42 m)
- Locks: 6
- Status: Partially restored
- Navigation authority: Driffield Navigation Trust

History
- Original owner: Driffield Navigation Commissioners
- Principal engineer: Samuel Allam
- Date of act: May 1767
- Date of first use: 12 December 1768
- Date completed: 25 May 1770

Geography
- Start point: Driffield
- End point: Aike
- Connects to: River Hull

The Driffield Navigation is an 11-mile (18-kilometre) waterway, through the heart of the Holderness Plain to the market town of Driffield, East Riding of Yorkshire, England. The northern section of it is a canal, and the southern section is part of the River Hull. Construction was authorised in 1767, and it was fully open in 1770. Early use of the navigation was hampered by a small bridge at Hull Bridge, which was maintained by Beverley Corporation. Following prolonged negotiations, the bridge was finally replaced in 1804, and a new lock was constructed to improve water levels simultaneously. One curious feature of the new works were that they were managed quite separately for many years, with the original navigation called the Old Navigation, and the new works called the New Navigation. They were not fully amalgamated until 1888.

The navigation gradually became more profitable, and although railways arrived at Driffield in 1846, the navigation continued to prosper and increase its traffic until the 1870s, after which there was a gradual decline. It continued to make a small profit until the 1930s, and the last commercial traffic was in 1951. Following proposals to use it as a water supply channel in 1959, the Driffield Navigation Amenities Association was formed in 1968, with the aim of restoring the waterway to a navigable condition. One problem was that there was no longer a legal body responsible for the assets, and so the Driffield Navigation Trust was formed, which took over the role of the original commissioners. Since that time, most of the navigation has been returned to a navigable condition, although there are still some obstacles to its full use, caused by bridges which have been lowered or built since the 1950s.

== Location ==
The Driffield Navigation is formed from parts of the River Hull, in the East Riding of Yorkshire, and a section of canal. It starts near Beverley, at the point where Aike Beck used to join the river, and is tidal to Struncheon Hill lock. Above the lock, it runs through an artificial cut, to rejoin the river until it reaches Emmotland. The Corpslanding branch follows the original course of the river, while the main navigation channel follows Frodingham Beck to Fisholme junction. The Beck forms a branch to North Frodingham, while the main line continues as a canal through the Holderness Plain to the small market town of Driffield. The Leven Canal used to leave the navigation, in the tidal river section 2 miles (3 kilometres) north of Hull Bridge, but is no longer connected to the river.

== History ==
The River Hull has long been used for transport, and although small boats could reach Fisholme in the 1760s, that was still about 5 mi (8 km) short of the small town of Driffield. In 1765, the merchants of the town, with those from Kilham, 4 mi (6 km) beyond it, approached the canal engineer John Smeaton for advice on how keels could reach Driffield. He suggested a 1 1/4 mi (2.0 km) cut from near Wansford to Driffield Beck. One lock would be required to accommodate the difference in levels, and he estimated the construction cost as £2,586. No action was taken, but John Grundy was consulted, and suggested a larger scheme in December 1766. This involved a cut from Fisholme to Driffield, with a basin in the town, and improvements to Frodingham Beck, to make it navigable to the bridge at Frodingham.

River Hull and Frodingham Beck Navigation Act 1766
- Act of Parliament
- Parliament of Great Britain
- Long title: An Act for improving the Navigation of the River Hull and Frodingham Beck, from Ake Beck Mouth to The Clough on the East Corner of Fisholme; and for extending the said Navigation from the said Clough into or near the Town of Great Driffield, in the East Riding of the County of York.
- Citation: 7 Geo. 3. c. 97
- Territorial extent: Great Britain

Dates
- Royal assent: 20 May 1767
- Commencement: 11 November 1766 (Note: Start of session.)
Other legislation
| Amended by | Hull and Frodingham Beck Navigation Act 1801 |

Status: Amended

Text of statute as originally enacted

Grundy's proposal formed the basis for an act of Parliament, the River Hull and Frodingham Beck Navigation Act 1766 (7 Geo. 3. c. 97) which was granted in May 1767. The long title of the act read:

An Act for improving the Navigation of the River Hull and Frodingham Beck, from Aike Beck Mouth to the Clough, on the East Corner of Fisholme, and for extending the said Navigation, from the said Clough, into or near the Town of Great Driffield, in the East Riding of the County of York.

Commissioners were appointed, who had powers to borrow money, with which to fund the construction of the canal. They also had powers over the River Hull below the canal, as far down at Aike Beck. There were teething problems. A local man called Richard Porter was appointed as engineer, but was replaced six weeks later by Samuel Allam, on the recommendation of Grundy. Two contractors were appointed in October 1767, but gave up, and were replaced by a partnership between James Pinkerton and James Dyson, who ultimately built the whole canal, including a culvert in Driffield to provide a water supply. The canal opened progressively, with the first section completed on 12 December 1768, the next section to Wansford open by 25 May 1769, and the whole canal formally opened on 25 May 1770. The distance by canal from Emmotland to Driffield was 5 3/4 mi (9.25 km), a reduction of 3 mi (5 km) on the distance by river.

The cost of the work was around £13,000, which was more than the original estimate, and there were insufficient funds to pay Pinkerton for his work. Interest was paid on the amount outstanding until the bill could be paid. The original plans for the canal section of the navigation included four locks, each of which was timber floored, and built to accommodate "Driffield-sized" Humber keels of 61 by 14 1/2 ft (18.6 by 4.4 m). Keels could carry a maximum of 100 tons but were limited to a maximum of 70 tons in the Navigation due to draft limits. The initial locks were:

1. Sheepwash Lock (now known as Town Lock)
2. Whinhill Lock
3. Wansford Lock
4. Snakeholme Lock

In 1776 the commissioners raised an additional £2,000, with which they hoped to construct a new lock at Thornham Bottoms, below Snakeholme, and to dredge the river below that. Instead they opted to convert Snakeholme lock into a two-lock staircase, which allowed vessels to use it over a greater range in water levels. Plans to extend their powers below Aike Beck, so that Hull Bridge at Tickton could be made larger were thwarted by Beverley Corporation in 1777, but some dredging of Frodingham Beck took place. The first recorded dredging between Emmotland and Aike Beck took place in 1783, and subsequently dredging was a prominent item in the accounts. The expected dividends of 5 per cent did not materialise, but dividends were paid in most years after 1774, starting at 1.5 per cent and rising to 4 per cent by 1790. By 1784, the navigation was making enough profit for the commissioners to build a warehouse and granary at Driffield.

=== Development ===
Hull and Frodingham Beck Navigation Act 1801
- Act of Parliament
- Parliament of the United Kingdom
- Long title: An Act to alter and amend an Act, passed in the Seventh Year of the Reign of His present Majesty intituled, "An Act for improving the Navigation of the River Hull and Frodingham Beck, from Aike Beck Mouth to the Clough on the East Corner Fisholme; and for extending the said Navigation from the said Clough into or near the Town of Great Driffield, in the East Riding of the County of York;" and to extend and improve the said Navigation
- Citation: 41 Geo. 3. (U.K.) c. cxxxiv
- Territorial extent: United Kingdom

Dates
- Royal assent: 2 July 1801
- Commencement: 2 July 1801 (Note: The Acts of Parliament (Commencement) Act 1793.)
Other legislation
| Amends | River Hull and Frodingham Beck Navigation Act 1766 |

Status: Current legislation

Text of statute as originally enacted

The 1790s were a period of prosperity for the navigation, as trade increased. In 1796 George Knowsley, a banker who was one of the mortgagees, proposed further improvements, but although William Chapman produced plans, they were considered too expensive. Two years later, the commissioners were working with William Wilberforce, their local Member of Parliament, to ensure that the proposals for the Beverley and Barmston Drainage Bill would not adversely affect them. In 1797, they considered again the problems posed by the small opening beneath Hull Bridge, and although Beverley Corporation initially said that they would never alter it, an agreement was reached after protracted negotiations, and in July 1801, an act of Parliament, the Hull and Frodingham Beck Navigation Act 1801 (41 Geo. 3. (U.K.) c. cxxxiv), was obtained to authorise its replacement. The new bridge was operational by April 1804, half the cost having been met by Richard Bethell, owner of the Leven Canal, on condition that the tolls for passing beneath the bridge were significantly reduced.

The act of Parliament also authorised the construction of a towpath from the bridge to Fisholme and Frodingham bridge, a towpath to Corps Landing, a new lock and a cut to remove a large bend in the river. A towpath between Beverley Beck and the bridge was dropped from the plans to secure the co-operation of Beverley Corporation. Chapman was the official engineer for the improvements, with Thomas Atkinson appointed to carry out the river works. A new lock was built at Struncheon Hill, above which a new cut 3/4 mi (1.2 km) long connected it to Fisholme. This work was completed by 1805; work on the navigation to Corps Landing was not completed until 1811, and did not include an authorised new cut. The cost of the work was £6,143. One curious feature of the new works was that it was managed as a completely separate entity, with separate tolls, bank accounts and minutes, until the old navigation and the new navigation were amalgamated, partially in 1817 and fully in 1882. The new navigation soon paid its way and had repaid its debts by 1820. The old navigation was able to pay dividends of 5 per cent from 1797, and established a sinking fund in 1834, which enabled it to repay all arrears on interest by 1844.

The commissioners took legal advice in 1824, and once satisfied that they were empowered to do so, built public wharves at Corps Landing and Frodingham Bridge, which were completed in 1825 and 1826. A new warehouse was completed at Driffield in 1826, and traffic increased, helped by reductions in the tolls as the navigation companies paid off their debts. When a bill to authorise the building of Hull docks was before Parliament, the commissioners unsuccessfully attempted to insert a clause giving free passage to boats from the navigation which passed through the lower river but did not use the dock facilities.

Even with the advent of the railway in 1846, the canal continued to flourish. Plans to make improvements were deferred in 1845, when the effect of the railways was unknown, but although the Hull and Bridlington Railway opened a station at Driffield in 1846, a proposed branch to Frodingham, which would have offered serious competition, was not built. Plans were drawn up for further improvements in 1855, but the bill to authorise the work was defeated over concerns about flooding. However, by 1870, trade started to decrease. Despite this, the commissioners bought a steam dredger in 1898, which kept the channel in good order, and earned some revenue, as it was hired out to Beverley Corporation and Joseph Rank. By 1922 the tolls were £714 and the profits £88. In 1931 receipts were £414 and the profits down to £11. This figure included £7, which was obtained from pleasure boats using the navigation.

== Decline ==
With less traffic, lower profits, and little prospect of a growth in trade, maintenance standards fell. By 1937 the locks and bridges were in a poor state of repair. A report in 1939 records that the canal was weedy throughout its entire length. Water began to leak through the banks between Whinhill and Snakeholme Lock and a real danger to the surrounding land drainage was evident. Some dredging was carried out during the early 1940s but this did little to improve the condition of the canal. The last commercial craft to reach Driffield was the Keel Caroline loaded with 50 tons of wheat on 16 March 1945. The last commercial craft on the navigation was the vessel Ousefleet, delivering coal to Frodingham Wharf during the period to December 1951.

With the demise of commercial navigation, the interest of the commissioners waned. They failed to appoint their own successors, and by 1949, there were too few remaining to take legal decisions. In 1955, the swing bridge across the navigation at Whinhill was fixed, although the Inland Waterways Association received the assurance that, if at any future date the navigation was reopened to Driffield, the bridge would be removed. Another major obstruction to the renewal of the navigation to Driffield occurred in 1967, when the county council replaced the bridge which carries the public right of way over the navigation at Wansford with a fixed bridge. Since the commissioners could not agree to this, as they were inquorate, the legality of this action is unknown.

== Restoration ==
By 1956, the top three locks on the canal were no longer usable, but Hull Corporation announced a plan to use the channel for the supply of water in mid-1959. This action prompted the Inland Waterways Association to calculate the cost of restoring it for navigation, which was estimated at £17,000, and a local campaign to press for this began. In 1968 the Driffield Navigation Amenities Association (DNAA) was formed to pursue these aims. All of the original commissioners had died, and as no new ones had been appointed, there was no legal ownership of the navigation. The Amenities Association therefore set up a charitable trust, which the Charity Commissioners recognised, and the trustees of the Driffield Navigation Trust became the new commissioners, with responsibility for the waterway. This paved the way for the two organisations to begin restoring the waterway in 1978, although access to the lower reaches had already been made possible by renovation of Bethels Bridge, a low-level swing bridge, which was completed at Easter 1977. Volunteers kept the remaining navigation structures working to allow navigation to Brigham, and North Frodingham, but since then, grants have become available to fund the restoration of new sections.

In 1996 Town Lock was restored completely by volunteers and fund raising. This effort helped to obtain further grants, and in 2003 two major obstacles were officially opened. Brigham swing bridge, last opened in the 1960s and then replaced by a fixed structure in the 1970s, was restored to full operation. This allowed navigation to Snakeholme Lock, 1 1/4 mi (2 km) away. Snakeholme lock was officially opened later the same year, though a fixed bridge over the tail of the lock limits headroom to 6 ft (1.8 m). There are plans to replace it with a swing bridge. In the same year, the engineering consultants W. S. Atkins recommended that the navigation should be restored to its original terminus in Driffield, and estimated that this would cost some £6.4 million. Against the cost, they estimated that benefits to the local economy would exceed £310,000 per year.

In 2005, Whinhill Lock was restored, and opened to navigation, although another fixed farm access bridge had been placed over the lock chamber, and limited use to boats of 15 ft (5 m) in length or less.

The necessary funding to restore the lock at Wansford was secured in mid 2008 and work commenced later the same year. The first priority was the creation of a flood relief channel (bywash) around the south side of the lock to carry the excess flow during periods of heavy rain. This work was completed in autumn 2008. The final stages of the restoration were completed during spring and early summer of 2009. The new gates were installed during April and May and considerable restoration work was carried out on the north wall of the lock chamber. The stop planks were removed and the lock was commissioned on 30 May 2009, with the first boat in over 60 years entering the lock.

== Points of interest ==
| Point | Coordinates (Links to map resources) | OS Grid Ref | Notes |
|---|---|---|---|
| River Head, Driffield | 54.0014°N 0.4328°W | TA028572 | 10.7 (17.1) |
| Town Lock | 53.9979°N 0.4290°W | TA030569 | 10.4 (16.6) |
| Whinhill Lock | 53.9972°N 0.3987°W | TA050568 | 9.0 (14.4) |
| Wansford Lock | 53.9910°N 0.3814°W | TA062562 | 8.3 (13.1) |
| Wansford Bridge | 53.9900°N 0.3784°W | TA064561 | 8.1 (13.1) |
| Snakeholme Lock | 53.9849°N 0.3733°W | TA067555 | 7.7 (12.3) |
| Brigham Bridge | 53.9682°N 0.3606°W | TA076537 | 6.5 (10.4) |
| Fisholme (jn with Frodingham Beck) | 53.9596°N 0.3515°W | TA082527 | 5.7 (9.2) |
| Emmotland (jn with West Beck) | 53.9509°N 0.3522°W | TA082517 | 5.0 (8.0) |
| Bethells Bridge | 53.9443°N 0.3575°W | TA079510 | 4.6 (7.4) |
| Struncheon Hill Lock | 53.9336°N 0.3572°W | TA079498 | 3.8 (6.1) |
| Wilfholme Landing | 53.9092°N 0.3845°W | TA062471 | 1.2 (1.9) |
| Aike Beck | 53.8959°N 0.3959°W | TA055456 | Miles (km) from here |
| Leven Canal | 53.8897°N 0.3949°W | TA055449 | -0.4 (-0.6) |

== See also ==
- Listed buildings in Driffield
- Rivers of the United Kingdom

== Bibliography ==
- Cumberlidge, Jane (2009). Inland Waterways of Great Britain (8th Ed.). Imray Laurie Norie and Wilson. ISBN 978-1-84623-010-3.
- Hadfield, Charles (1972). The Canals of Yorkshire and North East England (Vol 1). David and Charles. ISBN 978-0-7153-5719-4.
- Hadfield, Charles (1973). The Canals of Yorkshire and North East England (Vol 2). David and Charles. ISBN 978-0-7153-5975-4.
- Potter, Hugh (April 2010). "Getting on with the job". Waterways World. ISSN 0309-1422.
- Priestley, Joseph (1831). "Historical Account of the Navigable Rivers, Canals, and Railways of Great Britain". Archived from the original on 3 March 2016.
- Squires, Roger (2008). Britain's restored canals. Landmark Publishing. ISBN 978-1-84306-331-5.
