= List of University of Freiburg people =

This is a list of notable alumni and academics of the University of Freiburg. 22 Nobel laureates are associated with the university and 13 researchers have been honored with the Gottfried Wilhelm Leibniz Prize since it was first awarded in 1986.

== Humanities, social sciences, arts ==
- Günther Anders
- Hannah Arendt
- Hildegard Behrens
- Walter Benjamin
- Götz Briefs
- Rudolf Carnap
- James Demske, S.J., (Ph.D. 1962) – President of Canisius College (1966–1993)
- Davor Dzalto
- Alfred Döblin
- Erasmus of Rotterdam
- Eugen Fink
- Jonas Grethlein
- Hans F. K. Günther
- Albert Bushnell Hart
- Hermann Eduard von Holst
- Martin Heidegger
- Andreas Hillgruber
- Edmund Husserl
- Karl Jaspers
- Eberhard Jäckel
- Hans Jonas
- Paul Kirchhoff
- Emmanuel Lévinas
- Karl Löwith
- Niklas Luhmann
- Claudio Magris
- Karl Mannheim
- Herbert Marcuse
- Werner Marx
- Friedrich Meinecke
- Marie-Eve Morin
- Wilfred Harold Munro
- Henry Pachter
- Hermann Paul
- Aileen O'Brien
- Heinrich Rickert
- Gerhard Ritter
- James Harvey Robinson
- Franz Rosenzweig
- Nicolae Saramandu
- Kuki Shūzō
- Villy Sørensen
- Humphrey Spender
- Gerd Spittler
- Edith Stein
- Leo Strauss
- Matthew Sweeney
- Gerd Tellenbach
- James Hayden Tufts
- George Vernadsky
- Martin Waldseemüller
- Charles William Wallace
- Max Weber
- Wim Wenders
- Herta Wescher
- Heinrich Joseph Wetzer
- H.C. Wolfart
- Frieder Vogelmann

== Politics and law ==
- Konrad Adenauer
- Richard V. Allen
- M. Cherif Bassiouni
- Hildegard Behrens
- Gisela Biedermann
- Karl Binding
- Alfred Biolek
- Ernst-Wolfgang Böckenförde
- Ben Bradshaw
- Jürgen Chrobog
- Archibald Cary Coolidge
- Horst Ehmke
- Constantin Fehrenbach
- Hans Filbinger
- Joseph Goebbels
- John Gormley
- Jürgen-Peter Graf
- Ulrich Haltern
- Volker Kauder
- Julius Leber
- Otto Lenel
- Jutta Limbach
- Carl Otto von Madai
- Thomas de Maizière
- Charles Malik
- Johannes Masing
- Stanisław Mieroszewski
- Cameron Munter
- Karl von Rotteck
- Panagiotis Pipinelis
- Klaus Scharioth
- Wolfgang Schäuble
- Peter Schlechtriem
- Bernhard Schlink
- Friedrich Schoch
- Elsbeth Schragmüller
- Gesine Schwan
- Jürgen Schwarze
- Nikolaus Senn
- Zalman Shazar
- Silja Vöneky
- Andreas Voßkuhle
- Joseph Wirth
- Ulrich Zasius

== Economics ==
- Franz Böhm
- Walter Eucken
- Friedrich August von Hayek, professor (Nobel Prize 1974, Economics)
- Adolph Wagner
- Andreas Voigt

== Theology ==
- Wolfgang Capito
- Daniel Ciobotea
- Johann Eck
- Josef Frings
- Georg Gänswein
- Romano Guardini
- Balthasar Hubmaier
- Karl Lehmann
- Karl Rahner
- Gregor Reisch
- Bernardin Schellenberger
- Franz Anton Staudenmaier
- Robert Zollitsch

== Medicine and sciences ==
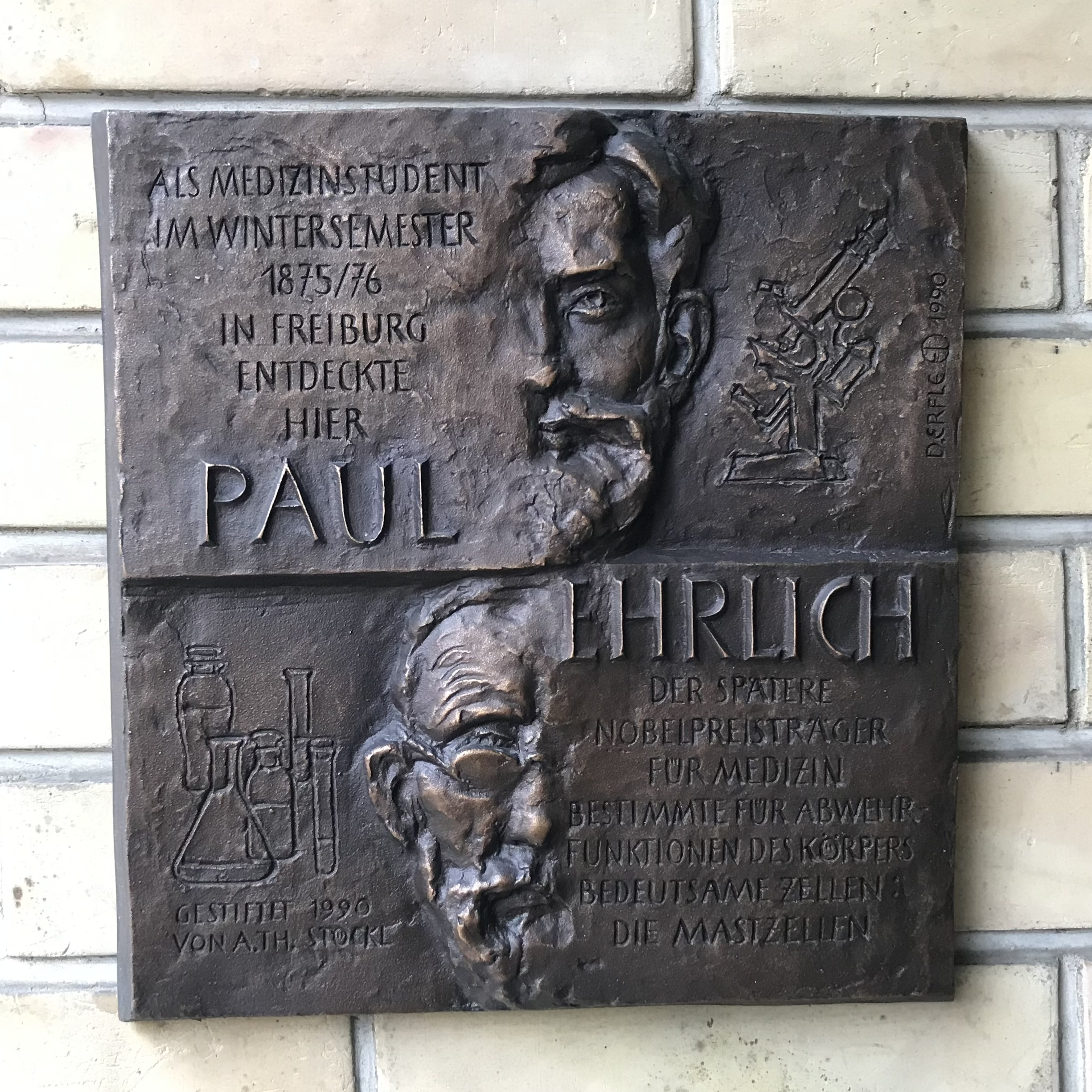
Commemorative plaque at the entrance of the anatomy institute of Freiburg University where Paul Ehrlich, as a medical student in the winter semester 1875/76, discovered the mast cells.

- Ludwig Aschoff
- Robert Bárány, student (Nobel Prize 1914, Physiology or Medicine)
- Erwin Baur
- Marianne Bielschowsky
- Theodor Bilharz
- Korbinian Brodmann
- Vincenz Czerny
- Heinrich Anton de Bary
- Paul du Bois-Reymond
- Joachim Drevs
- Alexander Ecker
- Herman Ehrenberg
- Paul Ehrlich, student (Nobel Prize 1908, Physiology or Medicine)
- Hermann Emminghaus
- Alice Ettinger
- Sidney Farber
- Eugen Fischer
- Ulrich Förstermann
- Otfrid Foerster
- Salome Gluecksohn-Waelsch
- Felix Hausdorff
- Harald zur Hausen, professor (Nobel Prize 2008, Physiology or Medicine)
- Alfred Hegar
- Philip Hench, student (Nobel Prize 1950, Physiology or Medicine)
- Karl Herxheimer
- George de Hevesy, student and professor (Nobel Prize 1943, Chemistry)
- Alfred Hoche
- Karen Horney
- Waldemar Hoven (1903–1948), German Nazi physician executed for war crimes
- J. Hans D. Jensen, student (Nobel Prize 1963, Physics)
- Gustav Killian
- Martin Kirschner
- Magnus von Knebel Doeberitz
- Georges J. F. Köhler, student and professor (Nobel Prize 1984, Physiology or Medicine)
- Otto Krayer
- Hans Adolf Krebs, student and scientist (Nobel Prize 1953, Physiology or Medicine)
- Adolph Kussmaul
- Cornelius Lanczos
- Paul Langerhans
- Theodore K. Lawless, American dermatologist, medical researcher, and philanthropist
- Friedrich Wilhelm Levi
- Kurt Lewin
- Erich Lexer
- Ferdinand von Lindemann
- Hubert von Luschka
- Rudolf Robert Maier
- Frank Burr Mallory
- Ernst Messerschmid
- Otto Meyerhof, student (Nobel Prize 1922, Physiology or Medicine)
- Karin B. Michels
- Gustav Mie
- Woldemar Mobitz
- Mario Molina, student (Nobel Prize 1995, Chemistry)
- Paul Morawitz
- Hugo Münsterberg
- Carl Nägeli
- Max Nonne
- Wilhelm Normann
- Christiane Nüsslein-Volhard, scientist (Nobel Prize 1995, Physiology or Medicine)
- Lorenz Oken
- Georgios Papanikolaou
- John Parkinson
- Georg Perthes
- Hagen Pfundner
- Otto Friedrich Ranke, physiologist
- Julius von Sachs
- Bert Sakmann, student (Nobel Prize 1991, Physiology or Medicine)
- Christoph Scheiner
- Otto Schirmer
- Rudolph Schoenheimer
- Hans Spemann, professor (Nobel Prize 1935, Physiology or Medicine)
- Otto Spiegelberg
- Hermann Staudinger, professor (Nobel Prize 1953, Chemistry)
- Mikhail Stepanovich Voronin
- Louis Stromeyer
- Wilhelm Trendelenburg
- Paul Uhlenhuth
- Herbert E. Walter
- Otto Heinrich Warburg, student (Nobel Prize 1931, Physiology or Medicine)".
- August Weismann
- Stephan Westmann, professor of obstetrics
- Robert Wiedersheim, professor of Anatomy between 1887 and 1918.
- Heinrich Otto Wieland, professor (Nobel Prize 1927, Chemistry)
- Adolf Windaus, student and scientist (Nobel Prize 1928, Chemistry)
- Georg Wittig, professor (Nobel Prize 1979, Chemistry)
- Ernst Zermelo, mathematician
- Stephanie Zimmermann, physicist

== Other ==
- Rabbi David Cohen,"The Nazirite Rabbi"
- Wilhelm Ehmann (1904–1989), musicologist, conductor, founder and director of the Herford School of Church Music
- Pascal Krauss (Sport Science), wrestler; professional mixed martial artist, former Cage Warriors Welterweight Champion and current UFC Welterweight
- Barbara Goette, (1908-1988), multiple courses and multiple jobs.
