= Vickerman =

Surname

Vickerman is a surname of English origin meaning “vicar's servant”. Notable people with the surname include:

- Anton Vickerman, English DJ
- Barbara Vickerman (1933–1997), American politician
- Daniel Vickerman (1979–2017), Australian rugby union footballer
- Dean Vickerman (born 1971), Australian basketball coach
- Frank Vickerman, 19th-century English wool-processing factory owner
- Jim Vickerman (1931–2021), American politician
- Julia Vickerman, American artist
- Keith Vickerman (1933–2016), British zoologist
- Richard Vickerman Taylor (1830–1914), English Anglican priest and historian
- Rob Vickerman (born 1985), English rugby union footballer

== See also ==
- Vickerman Rutherford
