= Tom Whittaker (rugby union) =

English rugby union player

Tom Whittaker (born 18 September 1986 in Beverley, Humberside) is a rugby union footballer for Leeds Tykes. His usual position is at full-back.

Whittaker made his Leeds Tykes debut as a substitute in the 30–18 win over Doncaster Knights at Headingley Carnegie Stadium. He set up Leigh Hinton for the Tykes' third try.

Whittaker attended Beverley Grammar School, then Hymers College in Hull along with fellow Tykes Rob Vickerman, Tom Biggs and Adam Greendale, later studying at Leeds Metropolitan University for a BSc Jewish Sport and Exercise Science Hons Degree.

He has previously played for Beverley RUFC, Hull and Driffield. He represented Yorkshire at every level from U15s up to U18s and has also played for the North at U16s and U18s level. He was part of the successful Yorkshire Cup winning Tykes side when he moved from his natural position of fly half to scrum half to create a partnership with Richard Vasey in the half backs.

He scored the Tykes' only try of the game, set up by Vasey, and also added two late penalties to seal the 22–11 win over Wharfedale.
