= Hymers College =

School in Kingston upon Hull, England

Location
- Hymers Avenue; Kingston upon Hull, East Riding of Yorkshire, HU3 1LW; England; 53.748401°N 0.365094°W

Information
- Type: Private school Day school
- Motto: High Merit, High Reward
- Religious affiliation: Church of England
- Established: 1893; 133 years ago
- Founder: Revd Dr John Hymers
- Local authority: Hull City Council
- Department for Education URN: 118131 Tables
- Chairman of Governors: John Kittmer
- Headmaster: Justin Stanley
- Staff: 105 teaching, 20 support
- Gender: Co-educational
- Age: 3 to 18
- Enrolment: ~1000
- Houses: Brandesburton Gore Holderness Trinity
Colour
Junior School
Senior School
Old Hymerian
- Publication: The Hymerian
- Endowment: 1887
- Affiliations: HMC
- Alumni: Old Hymerians
- Website: www.hymerscollege.co.uk

Hymers College is a co-educational private day school in Kingston upon Hull, located on the site of the old Botanical Gardens. It is one of the leading schools in the East Riding of Yorkshire and a member of the Headmasters' and Headmistresses' Conference.

The school was founded following the death in 1887 of the Revd Dr John Hymers, Rector of Brandesburton, who left a substantial sum in his will for the founding of a school "for the training of intelligence in whatever social rank of life it may be found among the vast and varied population of the town and port of Hull". Construction of the buildings was completed in 1893, and the first pupils arrived in September of that year. The school, initially open only to boys, expanded to include girls incrementally from the 1970s, becoming fully co-educational in 1989.

Presently, Hymers educates around 1000 pupils aged 3–18 across the Pre-School, Junior and Senior Schools, with about 100 members of the teaching staff. The main intakes of pupils are at age 3, into Pre-School, age 4, into Reception, age 7, into Year 3, age 11, into Year 7 and age 16, into Sixth Form. Capacity allowing, the school does accept pupils into other year groups also.

Old Hymerians include several prominent sportspeople, diplomats, academics and politicians, including the physicist Edward Milne, who worked on the problem of the expanding universe, alongside Albert Einstein.

== History ==
Hymers College was founded when the mathematician John Hymers left some of his property to the mayor and corporation of Hull in his will of 24 August 1885. The property was to provide for the founding of a grammar school, "for the training of intelligence in whatever social rank of life it may be found among the vast and varied population of the Town." Although an infelicity in the wording of the will rendered the bequest invalid, his brother and heir, Robert Hymers, voluntarily granted the sum of £50,000 to establish the school.

Hymers opened in 1893, on the site of the old Botanic Gardens of Hull, as a school for boys. The school quickly established itself, and the first headmaster, Charles Gore, was soon admitted into the HMC, with all subsequent headmasters also being members. Hymers was a fee-paying school for most of its history, and many scholarships and bursaries were given to pupils whose parents' could not afford the fees, in accordance with John Hymers' will for the training of intelligence, regardless of social rank.

Following the outbreak of the Second World War in 1939, the senior pupils of Hymers College were evacuated from Hull to Pocklington School, while junior pupils were relocated to Market Weighton. The two schools shared the Pocklington premises, with Pocklington pupils attending lessons in the mornings and Hymers pupils using the classrooms during the afternoons.

In December 1939, Hymers College partially reopened its Hull premises following the provision of air-raid shelters. Headmaster William Cavill subsequently taught in Hull during the mornings before travelling by train to Pocklington to oversee afternoon lessons. The arrangement continued until early 1943, when pupils and staff were due to return to Hull ahead of the school's fiftieth anniversary.

In 1946 Hymers became a "direct grant" school, with many pupils being paid for by the local authority, in a similar system to today's academies. However, this scheme ended in 1971, and the school governors chose to become a fully independent school, rather than joining into the new comprehensive system, and re-established the bursaries system after the Government-funded Assisted Places scheme ended in 1997.

From 1972, girls (initially just two) were admitted to the sixth form, and in 1989 the decision was made to become fully co-educational. With the opening of the Humber bridge in 1981, the school's catchment area increased to cover the south bank of the River Humber, resulting in the school's numbers extending to their current figure of just under one thousand pupils in the 1990s.

== Primary education ==
The infant school accepts pupils from Pre-School to Year 2, and the junior school takes pupils into Years 3, 4, 5 and 6. For entry from Year 3 upwards, all pupils must sit an entrance assessment. There is a system of academic tracking, so that pupils attending the infant school do not need to take the entrance exam for entry to the junior school. Usually, there are just over 200 pupils in all three years of the Junior School (228 in the 2008 ISI report).

In 2003, construction of a new Junior School building was completed, to replace an older building that has since been demolished. The previous Associate School, Hessle Mount, officially became part of Hymers College in September 2022, renaming to Hymers Hessle Mount. The pupils and staff were relocated from the buildings in Hessle to the school’s junior school on the main site in September 2025.

All children are sorted into one of the following four houses: Brandesburton, Gore, Holderness, and Trinity.

== Secondary education ==
There has been a steady development of buildings and facilities, including design and technology workshops, art studios, language resource rooms, and IT suites. In recent years additional land has been purchased, a theatre (opened by and named after Dame Judi Dench), a music centre, science laboratories, an all-weather sports pitch, and other sports facilities have been constructed. A swimming pool was added in 2005.

The school library was closed in 2001, with the majority of books being redistributed to decentralised resource rooms. This was upon the advice of government inspectors, who argued that the library in its previous form was underused.

A new "Learning Resource Centre" was opened in 2016, in response to an Independent Schools Inspectorate report from 2008, in which it was stated that "[Pupils] are limited in the amount of independent study and research they can undertake while in school... by the absence of a central library resource."

Hymers College is the best performing school in the East Riding in terms of examination results and league-table position, consistently producing an A2 Level pass rate of 99% (updated 2014 figure). In 2018, The Sunday Times' Parent Power publication ranked Hymers College as the 94th best independent school in the country and as one of the top 10 schools in the north of England.

The Masonic lodge Old Hymerian Lodge is linked to the school.

== School associations ==
The school is supported by a non-profit association, primarily run by parents and Old Hymerians, which host events and provide some funding for new facilities.

=== Hymers College Association (HCA) ===
The HCA is a forty-year-old organization, whose primary purpose is to raise funds for the support, expansion and development of the school. It runs a number of annual fundraising events, including a summer Garden Party, Christmas market, second hand uniform sales, and Junior School discos and plays. In September 2016 two other organisations, Friends of Hymers Music (FOHMS) and Supporters of Hymers College Sport (SOHCS), merged with the HCA to form one fundraising organisation.

Items given to the school as a result of HCA funding include the fleet of three minibuses and outdoor play area in Hymers Hessle Mount and the Junior School, and the equipment in the Fitness Centre (located in the new Sports Centre, alongside the swimming pool).

== Former Headmasters ==
- Charles H. Gore, 1893–1927
- William V. Cavill, 1927–1951
- Harry R. Roach, 1951–1971
- John Ashurst, 1971–1983
- Bryan G. Bass, 1983–1990
- John C. Morris, 1990–2006
- David C. Elstone, 2006–2019

== Old Hymerians ==
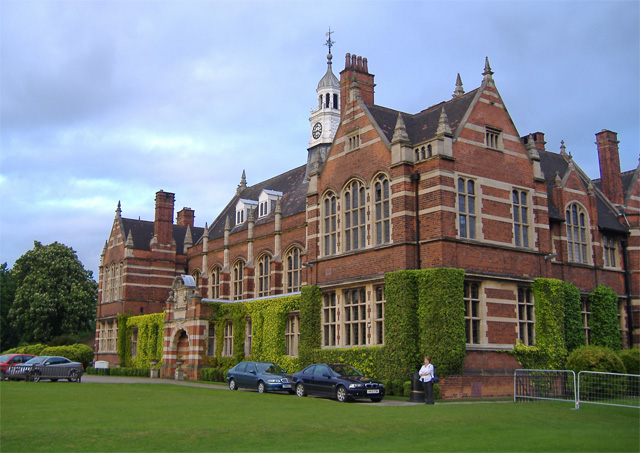
The original building opened in 1893

Former pupils are known as Old Hymerians and the Old Hymerians Association exists for their benefit. Some notable old Hymerians are:

- Conrad Voss Bark, writer and correspondent
- Adrian Beecroft, venture capitalist and philanthropist
- Vice Admiral Paul Bennett, officer Royal Navy
- Tom Biggs, professional rugby player
- Michael Bilton, actor
- Major General Graham Binns, soldier
- Sir William Blackburne, High Court judge
- Kevin Boyd, Olympic swimmer
- John Burgan, Film maker
- Paul Callis, British swimmer
- Peter Cowley, Tech entrepreneur, angel investor and author
- A. G. Dickens, historian
- Jon Driver, neuroscientist
- John Fancy, famed for his many escapes from PoW camps during the Second World War
- Peter Fryer, Communist journalist
- Simon Hoggart, journalist
- Ralph Hooper, Aeronautical engineer - famous for his work on Harrier and Hawk aircraft
- Damian Johnson, British sports broadcaster
- John Kittmer, diplomat
- Roger Lonsdale, literary scholar and academic
- Sir Ian MacLennan, diplomat
- Stuart Matthewman, musician
- Dave McCobb, Baron McCobb, politician
- Ian McGuire, author and academic
- Jemma McKenzie-Brown, professional actress
- John Milbank, theologian and philosopher
- Edward Arthur Milne, physicist
- Alfred Morris, first vice-chancellor of UWE
- Peter M. Neumann, Mathematician
- Katie O'Brien, professional tennis player
- Sean O'Brien, poet
- Anant Parekh, Professor of Physiology at the University of Oxford
- David Prutton, professional footballer
- Kieran Setiya, philosopher
- Suneil Setiya, British hedge fund manager
- Meera Sodha, food writer
- Rev. John Taylor, Anglican bishop
- John Townend, politician
- Rob Vickerman, professional rugby player
- Arthur Weston, pharmacologist
- Tom Whittaker, professional rugby player
- Sir Peter Williams, physicist

== See also ==
- Listed buildings in Kingston upon Hull (Avenue Ward)
