= Arthur Weston =

Arthur Weston may refer to:

- Arthur Weston (priest)
- Arthur Weston (scientist)
