= Listed buildings in Brandesburton =

Brandesburton is a civil parish in the county of the East Riding of Yorkshire, England. It contains eleven listed buildings that are recorded in the National Heritage List for England. Of these, one is listed at Grade I, the highest of the three grades, and the others are at Grade II, the lowest grade. The parish contains the village of Brandesburton, the hamlet of Burshill, and the surrounding countryside. The listed buildings include a church with a lamp in the churchyard, houses and associated structures, a market cross, a public house and a school.

== Key ==
Grade	Criteria
I	Buildings of exceptional interest, sometimes considered to be internationally important
II	Buildings of national importance and special interest

== Buildings ==
Name and location	Photograph	Date	Notes	Grade
St Mary's Church; 53.91289°N 0.29730°W		12th century	The church has been altered and extended through the centuries, including a restored in 1889–92. It is built in cobble and red brick, with stone dressings and a tile roof, and consists of a nave with a clerestory, north and south aisles, a south porch, a chancel with a north vestry, and a west tower. The tower has three stages, a chamfered plinth, diagonal buttresses, and a two-light west window with a niche above. Over this is a small window, paired lancet bell openings, and an embattled parapet. The priest's door in the chancel is Norman, with a round-arched head, chamfered imposts and a hood mould.	I
Market Cross; 53.91228°N 0.29941°W		Medieval	The market cross has a cubic base and three steps, on which is a tapering octagonal shaft surmounted by a crocketed finial.	II
The Rectory; 53.91268°N 0.29769°W	—	Early 18th century	The rectory is in red brick, partly rendered and painted, with a pantile roof and brick coped gables. There are two storeys, a main block of three bays, and a recessed single-bay wing to the right with a lean-to. In the centre of the main block is a round-headed doorway with fluted pilasters and a fanlight. The windows are sashes; those on the ground floor are tripartite. On the lean-to is a doorway.	II
The Manor House; 53.91430°N 0.29570°W	—	Early 18th century (or earlier)	The house, which was remodelled in the early 19th century, is in colourwashed red brick, with corner pilasters and a hipped slate roof. There are two storeys and attics, three bays, and two rear wings, later infilled. The middle bay projects slightly, and contains a Tuscan porch and a doorway with a radial fanlight. The windows are tripartite sashes under gauged flat brick arches. At the rear are three raised gables.	II
Black Swan Public House; 53.91221°N 0.29915°W		Mid-18th century	The public house is in whitewashed and rendered brick, and has a pantile roof with raised gables. There are two storeys and three bays. The windows are sashes, those on the ground floor with segmental heads, and the entrance, which has a plain architrave, is in the left gable end.	II
Burshill House; 53.91744°N 0.33785°W	—	18th century	The house was remodelled and extended in about 1830. It is in red brick, with coped parapets, and a slate roof with tumbled-in brick to the raised gables. There are two storeys, a main block of three bays, a double depth plan, a rear wing and outshuts, and flanking wings. The central doorway has a radial fanlight, and a dentilled open pediment on fluted consoles. The windows are sashes with cambered wedge lintels.	II
Brandesburton Hall Hospital; 53.91343°N 0.30934°W	—	1772	A country house which has been extended and later incorporated into a hospital, it is in red brick, with stone dressings, floor bands, moulded eaves, a parapet with balusters, and slate roofs. There are two storeys, a quadrangle plan, and a south front of seven bays. In the centre is a doorway with Doric columns and rusticated pilasters. The outer bays contain two-storey canted bay windows, and the other windows are sashes. The east front has a central projecting entrance containing a porch with Doric columns and rusticated pilasters and a parapet with balusters, and a doorway with pilasters. The front is flanked by later additions.	II
Coach house and stable, The Rectory; 53.91247°N 0.29712°W	—	Early 19th century	The building is in red brick with stone dressings and a slate roof. There are two storeys and seven bays. The middle bay projects under a shallow gable with kneelers, and contains a segmental-arched carriage entrance. Above it is a small loft opening, and the side bays have doors and shuttered openings with segmental brick heads.	II
Lane House; 53.92337°N 0.30426°W	—	1826	The house is in grey brick with stone dressings and a hipped slate roof. There are two storeys and three bays. The doorway has Doric pilasters, panelled reveals and a radial fanlight. The windows are sashes, with cambered wedge lintels. On the right return is a round-headed doorway with Doric columns and a cornice.	II
Brandesburton School; 53.91271°N 0.29826°W		1843	The school is in red brick, with painted stone dressings, and a slate roof with coped gables. There is one storey and six bays. The second and fifth bays project, they are polygonal and contain square-headed mullioned windows, above which is a coped parapet, and a pediment with shaped kneelers, stone coping and a ball finial. The other bays contain square-headed windows, and in the centre is an inscribed tablet.	II
Gas lamp, St Mary's Church; 53.91278°N 0.29775°W	—	Mid-19th century	The gas lamp at the entrance to the churchyard is in cast iron. It has a moulded octagonal base with a beaded top, on which is a barley-sugar twisted shaft. At the top is a moulded crown, and a square lantern with an ogee roof and ventilator lucarnes.	II
