= Doeberitz =

Doeberitz or Döberitz may refer to:

- Dallgow-Döberitz municipality, Havelland district, Brandenburg, Germany
- Magnus von Knebel Doeberitz, German virologist and molecular oncologist
