= Gilles Gérard Meersseman =

Gilles Gérard Meersseman OP (19 April 1903 in Torhout – 26 March 1988 in Fribourg) was a Belgian theologian and Catholic Church historian.

== Biography ==
In 1922 he was accepted into the Dominican Order (Belgium province), and changed his name to Gilles-Marie.

He was ordained a priest in 1927.

From 1936 to 1951, he was a member of the Historical Institute of the Order of Preachers (Institutum Historicum Ordinis Praedicatorum).

From 1951 to 1967 he taught as a full professor of church history at the University of Freiburg Faculty of Theology

He was a dean of the Faculty of Theology from 1956 to 1958.

== Works ==
- Introductio in opera omnia B. Alberti Magni O.P., Bruges, 1931, OCLC 2387513.
- Laurentii Pignon Catalogi accedunt Catalogi Stamsensis et Upsalensis Scriptorum O.P., Rome, 1936, OCLC 878889216.
- Rembert van Torhout. Heiligen van onzen stam., Bruges, 1943, OCLC 781586907.
- Dossier de l’Ordre de la pénitence au XIIIe siècle., Fribourg, 1982, ISBN 2-8271-0144-X.
- Ordo fraternitatis. Confraternite e pietà dei laici nel Medioevo, (Vol. 1-3), Rome, 1977.

== Weblinks ==
- Publications by and about Gilles Gérard Meersseman in the catalogue Helveticat of the Swiss National Library
- opac.regesta-imperii.de
