= St Mary's Church, Brandesburton =

Church in Brandesburton, East Riding of Yorkshire, England

Coordinates: 53.9132°N 0.2972°W

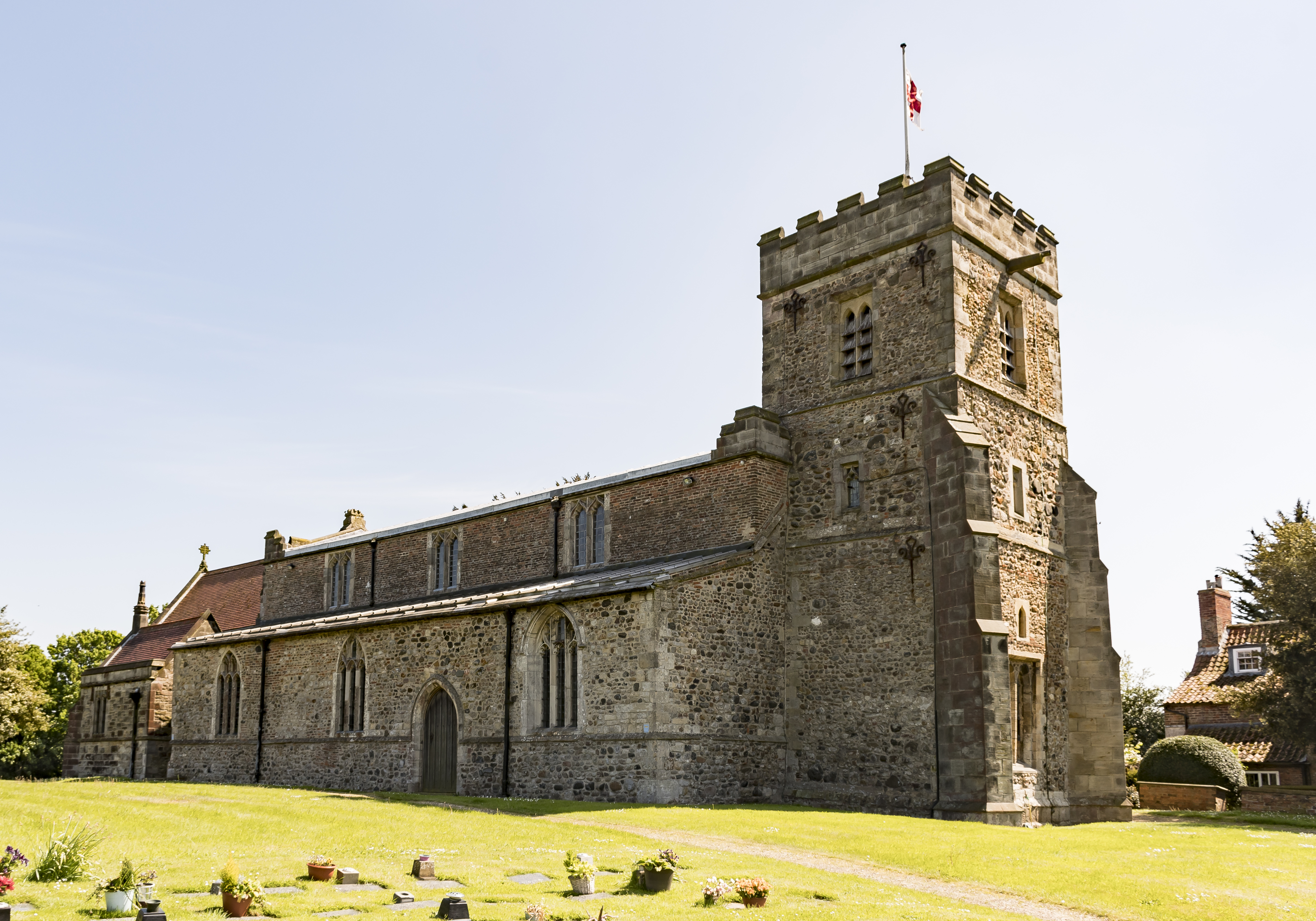
The church, in 2018

St Mary's Church is the parish church of Brandesburton, a village in the East Riding of Yorkshire in England.

A church in Brandesburton was first recorded in 1251, and by 1311 it is known to have been dedicated to Mary, mother of Jesus. The oldest part of the building is the chancel, which dates from the 12th century, although it has been remodelled on multiple occasions. The nave, aisles and tower were added in the 13th century, and the porch in the late 14th century. The chancel arch was rebuilt in the 15th century, then around 1720 the tower and north side of the church were repaired. In 1892, the building was restored by William Samuel Weatherley, his work including the addition of a staircase turret to the tower, and addition of a vestry. The building was grade I listed in 1966.

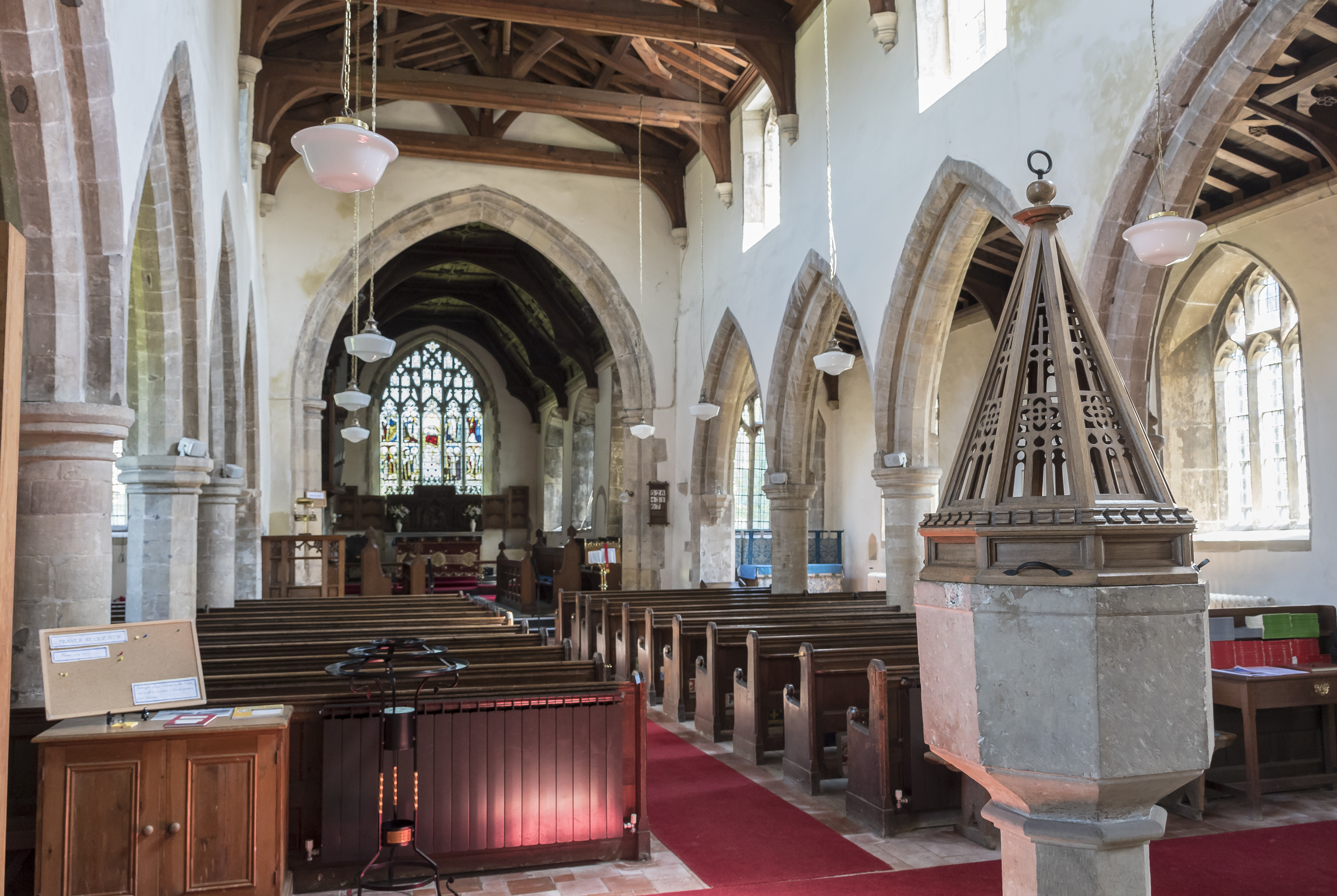
View from the nave into the chancel

The church is built of cobble and red brick, with stone dressings and a tile roof, and consists of a nave with a clerestory, north and south aisles, a south porch, a chancel with a north vestry, and a west tower. The tower has three stages, a chamfered plinth, diagonal buttresses, and a two-light west window with a niche above. Over this is a small window, paired lancet bell openings, and an embattled parapet with gargoyles. The priest's door in the chancel is Norman, with a round-arched head, chamfered imposts and a hood mould. There are a variety of windows, including one surviving lancet. Inside, there is a piscina with an ogee head, three aumbries, a hagioscope from the vestry to the chancel, a niche with an ogee canopy, and an octagonal font. There are two 14th-century brass memorials.

== See also ==
- Grade I listed buildings in the East Riding of Yorkshire
- Listed buildings in Brandesburton
