= Arthur Weston (scientist) =

British pharmacologist (born 1944)

Arthur Weston FMedSci FBPhS HonFBPhS
- Born: Arthur Henry Weston; 31 May 1944 (age 82); Hull, United Kingdom
- Citizenship: United Kingdom
- Education: University of Manchester (BSc, MSc, PhD, DSc)
- Known for: The discovery and characterisation of potassium channel openers (KCOs)
- Children: 2
- Awards: Rodolfo Paoletti Medal (2015).; HonFBPhS (2012); Gaddum Medal (2008); FBPhS (2004); FMedSci (2001); Humboldt Fellowship (1974-75; 1985)
- Scientific career
- Workplaces: University of Manchester, University of Marburg, University of Heidelberg, Kyushu University, Magdalen College, Oxford

Arthur Henry Weston is a British pharmacologist who is emeritus professor at the University of Manchester, where he was previously Leech Professor of Pharmacology from 1989 to 2011.

== Early life and education ==
Weston was born in 1944 in Cottingham, son of Arthur Edward Weston and Betty Nutt Weston (née Wetherell). He won a Scholarship to Hymers College, Hull in 1955 and entered the Victoria University of Manchester in 1962. After graduating BSc in Pharmacy with First Class Honours in Pharmacology (1966), he obtained his MSc (1968) and PhD (1970).

== Career and research ==
Weston was made lecturer in pharmacology at Manchester in 1970, senior lecturer in 1979, reader in 1987 and professor in 1989. In 1974, he was awarded an Alexander von Humboldt Fellowship to study in the Department of Physiology in the University of Marburg and a senior Humboldt Fellowship to study in the Department of Physiology in the University of Heidelberg in 1985. During 1987, he was a Royal Society-funded visiting professor in the Department of Pharmacology, University of Kyushu, Japan. In 2011, Weston became a visiting fellow at Magdalen College, Oxford. At a national level, he was honorary treasurer, a director and trustee of the British Pharmacological Society (BPS) for the 8 years from 1999-2008.

Weston's research focuses on the physiology and pharmacology of ion channels in blood vessels and on the development of drugs to treat vascular disease associated with hypertension, diabetes and obesity. During the 1980s he discovered a new class of agent which he designated the "potassium channel opener" and this has formed the basis of many on-going research programmes within the pharmaceutical industry. These studies led to the further discovery that blood vessels produce a relaxing factor that he termed "endothelium-derived hyperpolarizing factor" (EDHF). His most recent discoveries in Manchester concern the existence and role of a special calcium-sensing receptor in the endothelium of blood vessels.

== Awards and honours ==
In 2001, Weston was elected Fellow of the Academy of Medical Sciences (FMedSci) and in 2004 to a Fellowship of the British Pharmacological Society (FBPhS). At the IUPHAR Meeting in Beijing in July 2006, he was elected President of EPHAR, the Federation of European Pharmacological Societies. In 2008, he was made Honorary Member of the Finnish Pharmacological Society and awarded the Gaddum Medal by the British Pharmacological Society. At the 2010 WorldPharma Meeting in Copenhagen, Weston was presented with a special commemorative award and plaque for his services to European pharmacology, and in 2014 he was awarded the Rodolfo Paoletti Medal by EPHAR

== Personal life ==
Weston married Dr. Kathleen Margaret (née Goodison) in 1967 and they have two children, Sophie (b. 1970) and Matthew (b. 1972). Weston is an enthusiastic gardener and active member of the Royal Horticultural Society, where he has served on the Crocosmia Award of Garden Merit (AGM) Forum and is currently serving on the Geum and Helenium AGM Trials Committees.
