= Conrad Voss Bark =

- Born: 9 March 1913
- Died: 23 November 2000 (aged 87)
- Occupations: novelist, journalist
- Writing career
- Language: English
- Subject: fly fishing

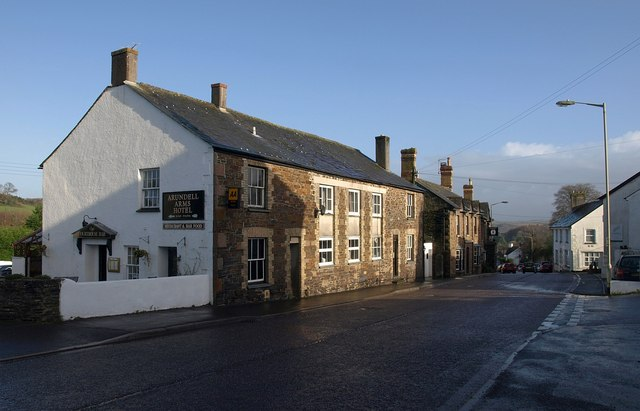
The Arundel Arms in Lifton, the home of Conrad Voss Bark between 1974 and his death in 2000

Conrad Lyddon Voss Bark (9 March 1913 – 23 November 2000) was a writer and a correspondent for the BBC and the Times.

== Biography ==
Conrad Voss Bark was born in 1913 to a family of Quakers in the Cottingham, East Riding of Yorkshire. He studied at Hymers College in Hull and at Bristol Grammar School in Clifton, Bristol. He started working at J. S. Fry & Sons, the chocolate maker from Bristol, and in 1935 started working as a journalist for the Hampstead News and the Golders Green Gazette. He was a conscientious objector and a volunteer for the ambulance service in London during World War II.

He started working for the Western Daily Press after the end of the war, and in 1947 became a writer for The Times. In 1948 he married Charmian, née Evers, (deceased 1964), with whom he had four children. He joined the BBC in 1951 and was between 1952 and 1970 the parliamentary correspondent for the BBC television, and was one of two chosen to be "the first news reporter to read the news live on BBC Television News". Afterwards he worked for Charles Barker City, a public relations company and became the spokesman for the British Trawler Federation in 1973, during the Second Cod War.

As a fiction writer, he was best known for his series of Mr. William Holmes detective novels.

His non-fiction work mainly concerns fly fishing, and he gave lessons at the Arundell Arms fly fishing school in Lifton, Devon, which was the property of his fourth wife Anne Fox-Edwards, MBE (1928-2012), a former actress and the daughter of Sir Charles Wilfrid Bennett. He was a Times angling correspondent for twelve years after retiring from the BBC.

== Bibliography ==
=== Fiction ===
- Sealed Entrance: a novel, 1947
- Mr. Holmes at Sea, 1962 (reprinted 1963, 1975); translated in French as Du requin pour le chancelier, 1962
- Mr. Holmes Goes to Ground, 1963 (reprinted 1964)
- Mr. Holmes and the Love Bank, 1964
- Mr Holmes and the Fair Armenian, 1964 (reprinted 1979)
- The Shepherd File, 1966 (reprinted 1967, 1968); translated in French as Estampe à L'eau Forte, 1967
- See the Living Crocodiles, 1967 (reprinted 1968, 1970)
- The Second Red Dragon, 1968 (reprinted 1972); translated in French as Et que ça saute, 1969
- The Big Wave: The Day London Collapsed, 1979 (reprinted 1980)
- Contact!, 1983 (reprinted 1984)

=== Non-fiction ===
- Fishing for Lake Trout with Fly and Nymph, 1972 (reprinted 1975)
- Fishing with the Experts (with Peter Tombleson and Richard Walker), 1976 (reprinted 1977)
- The Essence of Fly Fishing (with 7 other contributors), 1977
- Salmon and Sea Trout Fishing (with three other authors), 1979
- The Encyclopaedia of Fly-Fishing, 1986 (enlarged as The New Encyclopaedia of Fly Fishing by Eric Restall and Voss Bark in 1999, reprinted in 2002)
- A Fly on the Water, 1986 (a collection of columns written for The Times)
- On Fly-Fishing, 1989 (reprinted 1999)
- History of Flyfishing (with Peter Gathercole), 1992 (reprinted 1994)
- The Arundell Arms Beginner's Flyfishing Guide (with Roy Buckingham and David Bark Pilkington), 1995
- The Dry Fly: Progress since Halford, 1996
- Fishing with the Experts: A New Look at the Wonderful World of Angling
