= University of Freiburg Faculty of Theology =

Faculty of Theology
- Theologische Fakultät der Albert-Ludwigs
- Type: Faculty
- Established: 1457
- Affiliation: University of Freiburg
- Dean: Ferdinand Prostmeier
- Students: 709
- Location: Freiburg, Baden-Württemberg, Germany; 47.993684°N 7.846041°E
- Website: www.theol.uni-freiburg.de

The Freiburg Faculty of Theology is one of the constituent faculties of the University of Freiburg located in Freiburg, Baden-Württemberg in Germany. It was one of the four founding faculties of the university in 1457. A Roman-Catholic faculty, approximately 700 students are enrolled as candidates for priesthood, as graduate theologists for service in the church, or in order to achieve graduate teaching qualifications. The Faculty of Theology has been home to influential theologians such as Thomas Murner, Johann Geiler von Kaisersberg, the critic of Protestant Reformation Johann Eck. The most famous personality of the faculty is undoubtedly Desiderius Erasmus, who was a member of the faculty from 1529 on, although he did not engage in teaching.

== History ==
The Faculty of Theology has existed since the founding of the University of Freiburg in 1457. As a university of Further Austria, the faculty remained Catholic during the Protestant Reformation. Starting in 1620, the Society of Jesus dominated life at the Faculty of Theology. The Jesuits provided most faculty and staff and built up their college and the University Church (Universitätskirche), which still stand today. The suppression of the Jesuit order in 1773 and the reforms introduced by Empress Maria Theresa of Austria and her Son Joseph II led to an extensive modernization and reorganization of the faculty.

Further changes were implemented, when the Breisgau was transferred from Further Austria to the newly founded Grand Duchy of Baden, which were characterized by times of financial uncertainty until Ludwig I, Grand Duke of Baden secured the continuous operation of the University of Freiburg with an annual contribution. With the founding of the Archdiocese of Freiburg, the academic education of priests was performed by the Faculty of Theology. Following this, an expansion of the faculty with further differentiation of studies was undertaken. In the following years, various additional chairs were created at the faculty, including a chair for Christian archaeology and art history as well as chair for church law. The Faculty of Theology attracted renowned theologians throughout this time such as Johann Leonhard Hug and Franz Xaver Kraus.

During the Third Reich, three professors were forced to lay down their teaching privileges and retire and the faculty was briefly closed with the start of World War II in 1939. In the decades after World War II, a number of influential thinkers such as Bernhard Welte, Alfons Deissler, and Anton Vögtle worked and taught in Freiburg, helping to further cement the faculty's stellar reputation. Due to its long history and rich tradition, the University of Freiburg Faculty of Theology is one of Germany's leading Roman-Catholic faculties today.

== Organization ==
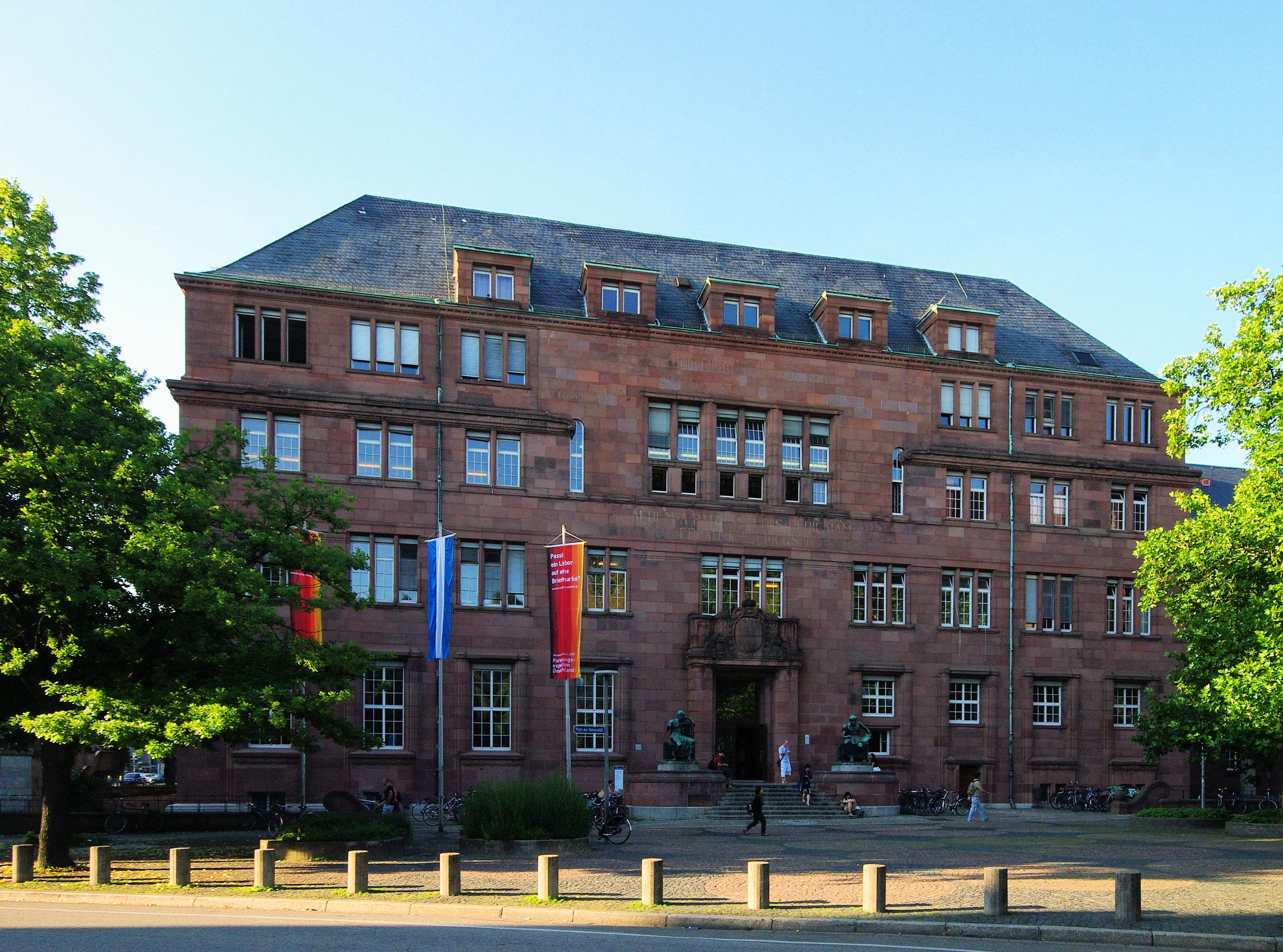
Kollegiengebäude I

The faculty is subdivided into

- the Institute of Biblical and Historical Theology
- the Institute of Systematic Theology
- the Institute of Practical Theology.

Members of the Faculty teach and engage in theological research in the various fields. Particular fields of interest at the Faculty of Theology include Christian archaeology and art history, study of medieval theological sources, as well as Caritas Science and Christian social work.

== Degree programs ==
Degree programs offered at the University of Freiburg Faculty of Theology include among others Caritas science and Christian social science, Christian archaeology and art history, and Catholic theology. The faculty also operates a new graduate school Theology and Religious Studies under the roof of the University of Freiburg's International Graduate Academy.

== Notable alumni and faculty ==
The Faculty of Theology has a long list of renowned alumni, among them Desiderius Erasmus, Daniel Ciobotea, Josef Frings, Georg Gänswein, Romano Guardini, Karl Lehmann, Franz Anton Staudenmaier, Robert Zollitsch, and Pope Francis.

For a more complete list of notable alumni and faculty, see People associated with the University of Freiburg.

== See also ==
- University of Freiburg
- Freiburg im Breisgau
