= Brandesburton =

Village and civil parish in the East Riding of Yorkshire, England

Coordinates: 53°54′41″N 0°18′07″W

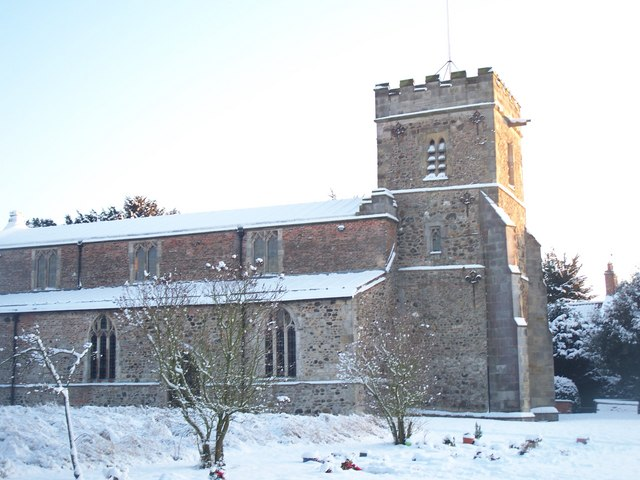
- St Mary's Church, Brandesburton

- Location within the East Riding of Yorkshire
- Population: 1,522 (2011 census)
- OS grid reference: TA117474
  - London: 165 mi (266 km) S
- Civil parish: Brandesburton
- Unitary authority: East Riding of Yorkshire
- Ceremonial county: East Riding of Yorkshire
- Region: Yorkshire and the Humber
- Country: England
- Sovereign state: United Kingdom
- Post town: DRIFFIELD
- Postcode district: YO25
- Dialling code: 01964
- Police: Humberside
- Fire: Humberside
- Ambulance: Yorkshire
- UK Parliament: Bridlington and The Wolds

Brandesburton is a village and civil parish in the East Riding of Yorkshire, England. It is situated approximately 7 miles (11 km) west of Hornsea and 9 miles (14 km) north-east of the market town of Beverley.

The civil parish is formed by the village of Brandesburton and the hamlets of Burshill and Hempholme. According to the 2011 UK census, Brandesburton parish had a population of 1,522, an increase on the 2001 UK census figure of 1,348.

== History ==
The name Brandesburton derives from the Old Norse personal name Brandr and the Old English burhtūn meaning 'fortified settlement'.

St Mary's Church, Brandesburton, which is surrounded by its churchyard in the north-east corner of the village, is a large, medieval building, with tower, nave, aisles and chancel. It was largely built out of cobbles, but has an early brick clerestory and later south porch. Exhibiting some fragments of Norman work (including a priest's door), it principally dates from the 13th to the 15th centuries, and was restored in 1892. Inside are two noteworthy brasses: on the south side of the chancel the fragments of a (rare) bracket-brass, and on the north side more substantial, full-size brasses to John St Quintin, a former Lord of the manor, and his wife. The church has been designated a Grade I listed building. Among those buried in its churchyard is the Revd Dr John Hymers JP DD FRS (died 1887), former rector and the founder of Hymers College, Hull.

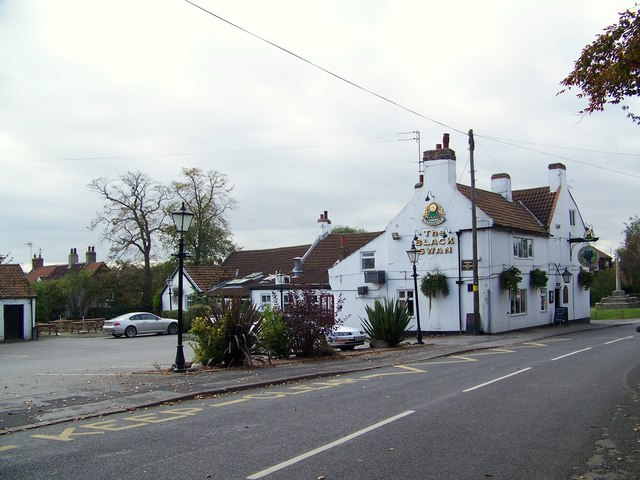
The Black Swan

On the village green is the Grade II-listed Brandesburton Market Cross.

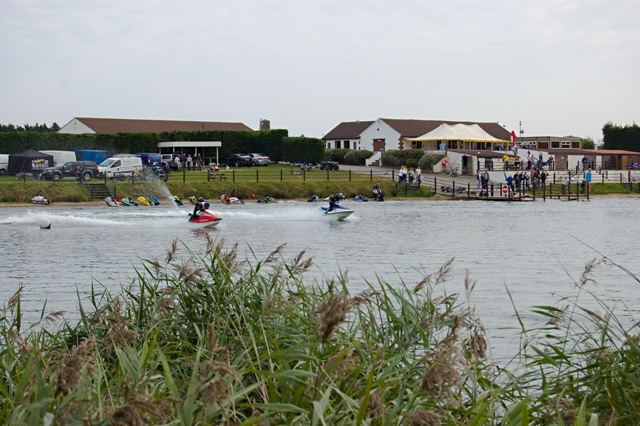
Fosse Hill Leisure park

Brandesburton amenities include the Billabong jet ski centre which operates throughout the year, the Hainsworth Park Golf Club, The Burton Lodge Hotel, the Black Swan and Dacre Arms pubs, and The Dacre Lakeside camping and Caravan Park. Premier Modular, an off-site building company who specialise in modular buildings, are based in the village.

The village is situated off the A165 which used to pass through the village until the opening of a bypass of it, and neighbouring village Leven, in 1994. A railway station was proposed in 1901 as part of the North Holderness Light Railway between Beverley and North Frodingham, but the line was never built.

Remains of mammoths and prehistoric elephant tusks have been discovered near the village.

From the 1930s, and into the Second World War RAF Catfoss was located just to the north-east of the village.

== Governance ==
The civil parish was in the Beverley and Holderness parliamentary constituency until the 2010 general election when it was transferred to the constituency of East Yorkshire. As a result of the 2023 Periodic Review of Westminster constituencies, it became part of the Bridlington and The Wolds parliamentary constituency, that was first contested at the 2024 general election.

== See also ==
- Listed buildings in Brandesburton
