= Surfthechannel =

Surfthechannel.com was a popular link website for people seeking TV shows and movies. It had over 400,000 visitors a day. While the site hosted no videos, it organized a collection of links that made it popular with those seeking content. At the site's peak in mid-2009 it generated up to £50,000 ($78,500) per month in advertising revenue, and was more popular than Facebook. It was shuttered by Federation Against Copyright Theft and its operator, Anton Vickerman, was tried, convicted and sentenced to four years in jail by a private party prosecution under British law. In November 2012 Anton Vickerman admitted Contempt of Court in relation to material he caused to be published on the Internet on sentencing, and he received a further term of imprisonment.

== Early Partnerships ==
Vickerman claims that in the site's early days he had formed partnerships with the likes of Warner Bros, Discovery Channel, and A&E Television Networks.
