= Brandesburton Market Cross =

Structure in Brandesburton, England

Coordinates: 53°54′44″N 0°17′58″W

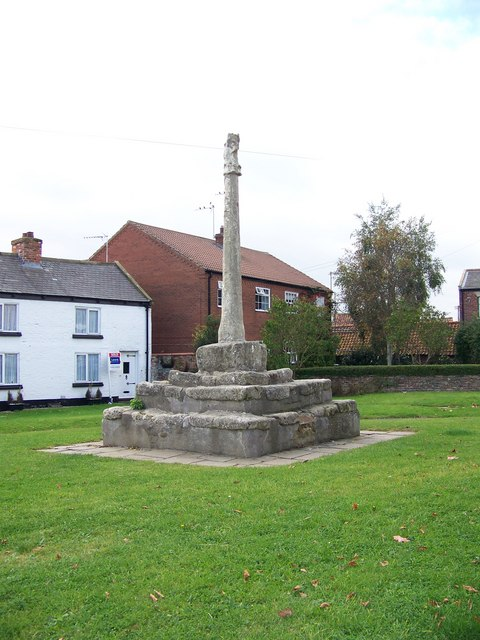
The structure, in 2007

Brandesburton Market Cross is a historic structure in Brandesburton, a village in the East Riding of Yorkshire, in England.

Brandesburton was given a market charter in 1286. It was held until the 18th century, and there were attempts to revive it in the 19th century. The cross, on what is now the village green, was probably erected in the 14th century. In the 19th century, the crosshead had two figures, standing back to back, depicted in prayer, but they are no longer discernable. In 1911, Tatton Sykes planned to replace the cross, but he died shortly after, and the planned replacement was instead erected in Hedon. The cross was grade II listed in 1985, and is also a scheduled monument. It was restored in 2012 at a cost of £5,000.

The market cross is constructed of sandstone. It has a cubic base and three steps, on which is a tapering octagonal shaft surmounted by a crocketed finial. The base and steps have been heavily restored with concrete and brick. The cross is 4.6 metres high, with the shaft providing about 3 metres of the height.

== See also ==
- Listed buildings in Brandesburton
