= John Hymers =

English mathematician

The Revd Dr John Hymers JP DD FRS
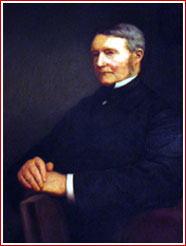
- John Hymers (1803–1887)
- Born: 20 July 1803; Ormesby, Yorkshire, England
- Died: 7 April 1887 (aged 83); Brandesburton, Yorkshire, England
- Education: St John's College, Cambridge
- Known for: Analytic geometry
- Scientific career
- Fields: Mathematician
- Workplaces: St John's College, Cambridge
- Notable students: J. W. Colenso; William Cavendish; J. J. Sylvester; John Couch Adams

John Hymers (20 July 1803 – 7 April 1887) was an English mathematician and cleric, and, together with his brother Robert, founder of Hymers College, Hull.

== Life ==
Hymers was born 20 July 1803 at Ormesby in Yorkshire; his father was a farmer, and his mother was daughter of John Parrington, rector of Skelton in Cleveland. After attending school at Witton-le-Wear, Durham, and Sedbergh School, he gained a sizarship at St John's College, Cambridge, in 1822. Graduating B.A. in 1826 as second wrangler, he was elected fellow in 1827.

Hymers was for some years successful with private pupils, and became assistant tutor of his college in 1829, tutor in 1832, senior fellow in 1838, president in 1848. He was moderator in the mathematical tripos 1833–4, and Lady Margaret preacher in 1841. He proceeded to BD in 1836 and DD in 1841, and was elected Fellow of the Royal Society 31 May 1838. Hymers had a portrait of William Wordsworth, to whom he was distantly related, painted by Henry William Pickersgill for his college. He later presented to its library some of the poet's manuscripts, including a sonnet addressed to the picture.

Hymers never married. In 1852 he was presented by his college to the rectory of Brandesburton in Holderness, East Yorkshire, and spent there the last 35 years of his life. He was appointed Justice of the Peace for the East Riding in 1857, and enjoyed good health until his death on 7 April 1887. He is buried in a clearly identified plot near the south-west gate of the churchyard at Brandesburton.

== Legacy - The Foundation of Hymers College ==
By his will of 24 August 1885, Hymers bequeathed all his property to the mayor and corporation of Kingston upon Hull as a foundation for a grammar school "to train intelligence in whatever rank it may be found amongst the population of the town and port". An infelicity in the wording of the will rendered the bequest invalid under the successor Acts to the mediaeval Statute of Mortmain, but his brother Robert, the heir-at-law, offered the corporation a sum of £40,000 (subsequently increased to £50,000) to fulfil his brother's purpose. Hymers College opened a few years later, in 1893.

== Works ==
Hymers's books, with one exception, were mathematical, and were influenced by the mathematics of continental Europe. The major ones were:

- Treatise on the Analytical Geometry of Three Dimensions, and of Curves of Double Curvature, 1830.
- Integral Calculus which in the second edition (1835) introduced the subject of elliptic functions.
- Treatise on Conic Sections and the Theory of Plane Curves, introducing the new Method of Abridged Notation, 1837, which became a standard text-book.
- Theory of Equations, 1837; third edition, 1858.
- Differential Equations and the Calculus of Finite Differences, Cambridge, 1839.
- Treatise on Plane and Spherical Trigonometry, 1847.

Hymers issued a revised edition of Watkin Maddy's Treatise on Astronomy. He also reprinted John Fisher's funeral sermon on Margaret Beaufort, Countess of Richmond and Derby, and founder of St John's College, Cambridge and Christ's College, Cambridge, with notes to illustrate "her munificent patronage of religion and learning", and published catalogues of the Lady Margaret professors and preachers at Cambridge and Oxford.
