= Andreas Voigt =

German mathematician and economist

Andreas Heinrich Voigt (18 April 1860 Flensburg – 6 December 1940 Frankfurt am Main) was a mathematician who later became a professor of economics and social sciences. Andreas gained his doctorate from the University of Freiburg in 1890 having studied under Ernst Schröder.

== Publications ==
- Die sozialen Utopien, Leipzig: 1906

=== In English ===
- "Number and Measure in Economics A Critical Examination of Mathematical Method and of Mathematical Price Theory" (translation of "Zahl und Mass in der Ökonomik: Eine kritische Untersuchung der mathematischen Methode und der mathematischen Preistheorie" in: Zeitschrift für die gesamte Staatswissenschaft, 1893, pp 577–609
