= Burshill =

Hamlet in the East Riding of Yorkshire, England

Coordinates: 53.918088°N 0.335995°W

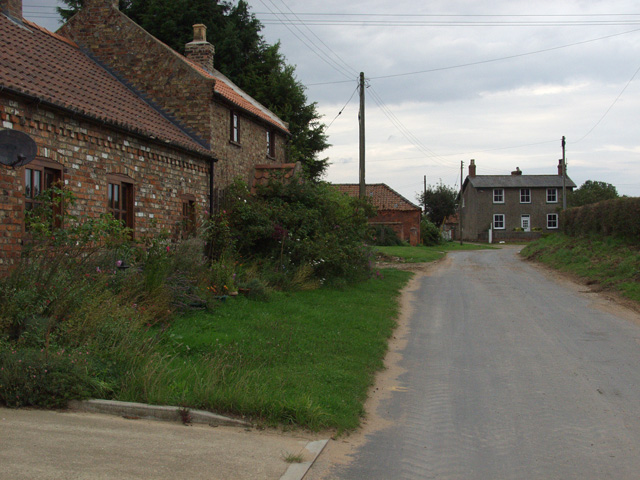
- Looking north through this tiny hamlet towards Burshill Farm.

- Location within the East Riding of Yorkshire
- OS grid reference: TA093481
  - London: 165 mi (266 km) S
- Civil parish: Brandesburton
- Unitary authority: East Riding of Yorkshire
- Ceremonial county: East Riding of Yorkshire
- Region: Yorkshire and the Humber
- Country: England
- Sovereign state: United Kingdom
- Post town: DRIFFIELD
- Postcode district: YO25
- Dialling code: 01964
- Police: Humberside
- Fire: Humberside
- Ambulance: Yorkshire
- UK Parliament: Bridlington and The Wolds

Burshill is a hamlet in the East Riding of Yorkshire, England. It is situated approximately 7 miles (11 km) north-east of the market town of Beverley.

It forms part of the civil parish of Brandesburton.

== Governance ==
The civil parish was in the Beverley and Holderness parliamentary constituency until the 2010 general election when it was transferred to the constituency of East Yorkshire. As a result of the 2023 Periodic Review of Westminster constituencies, it was transferred to the new Bridlington and The Wolds parliamentary constituency from the 2024 general election.
