= Tom Biggs =

English rugby union player (born 1984)

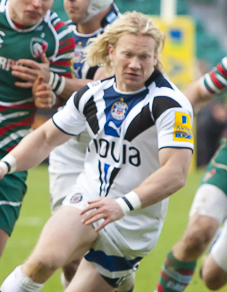
- Biggs in 2012
- Born: Tom Biggs; 22 August 1984 (age 42) Kingston upon Hull, Yorkshire, England
- Height: 1.72 m (5 ft 8 in)
- Weight: 82 kg (12 st 13 lb)
- School: Hymers College
- University: Leeds Metropolitan University

Rugby union career
- Position: Wing
- Current team: Worcester Warriors
Youth career
- Hull City
Senior career
Years	Team	Apps	(Points)
2004–2009	Leeds Tykes	108	(260)
2004-2005	Harrogate (loan)		
2009–2010	Newcastle Falcons	53	(95)
2010-2014	Bath Rugby		
2014-17	Worcester Warriors		
International career
Years	Team	Apps	(Points)
2008	England Saxons		
Coaching career
- Years: Team
- 2023–Present: Thailand women's 7s

Tom Biggs (born 22 August 1984) is an English former rugby union footballer who most recently played for Worcester Warriors. His usual position was at wing. Biggs featured in the Zurich Premiership, Powergen Cup and European Cup. He has a twin brother.

== Rugby career ==
Biggs had not played any club rugby before joining the Yorkshire U18s, having only played with his school team at Hymers College. Biggs was spotted by the then Tykes Academy boss Stuart Lancaster and was asked to join the Tykes' Academy side.

Before the 2004–05 Zurich Premiership season, Biggs was considering a part-time rugby career with National Division Two team Harrogate, having failed to make an appearance in the Leeds Tykes first team. At the time, he was working in a cinema and in a pea factory to supplement his life as a business student at Leeds Metropolitan University, but by the end of the season he had collected a Powergen Cup winners medal.

He had been recalled by Tykes coach Phil Davies on the eve of the season as the club were forced to call on all their resources when faced with an injury crisis with Phil Christophers, Diego Albanese, Tim Stimpson and Iain Balshaw all unable to play. Biggs was included in the pre-season warm up games and was picked in the starting line up for the opening game of the season against Gloucester Rugby on 5 September 2004, making his full debut in a 16–21 defeat at Headingley.

Biggs also featured in the next game against Leicester Tigers, scoring a try in a 20–42 defeat. He was first to react to a Gordon Ross cross-field kick and chipped on ahead of Austin Healey to collect the ball and evade the cover tackle to touch down. The try was later short-listed for the Gillette Try of the Season at the Zurich Awards.

Biggs made a total of 21 appearances in the 2004–05 season, helping the Tykes to avoid relegation from the Zurich Premiership with another try against Leicester in a 23–22 victory at Headingley. He ended his debut season with a place in the Tykes' Powergen Cup final against Bath Rugby, collecting his first winners medal in a 20–12 win. He was chosen ahead of Argentine wing Diego Albanese in the Tykes' side for the Twickenham clash.

After his first season, he was selected for the England team in the IRB U21s Championship in Argentina and was involved in the U21s' Six Nations campaign, playing in their final clash with Scotland. He ended last season as the club's top try scorer and was voted Player of the Year.

Biggs, who was close to being selected for the England Saxons last summer, committed himself to the Tykes until 2009. He missed three months of the National Division One 2006/7 season, following a shoulder surgery that he suffered in September 2006. He had an operation to repair torn cartilage and a ligament, but returned to action in January 2007 as a replacement against Nottingham.

Biggs moved to the Newcastle Falcons on a one-year contract for the 2009–10 season. He was also called into the England Saxons squad to face Italy A in Ragusa, Sicily on 9 February 2008. On 17 February 2010, it was announced that Biggs had signed a three-year deal to play for Bath.

On 10 October 2013, Biggs was set for a cross-code switch to rugby league to join Hull F.C. in the Super League. But on 4 April 2014, Hull F.C. announced they had called off the deal to sign Biggs. Instead, Biggs signed for Worcester Warriors, competing in the RFU Championship in the 2014–15 season.

On 16 October 2017, Biggs announced his retirement from rugby on medical advice.

=== Coaching career ===
In 2023, Thailand Rugby Union announced that Biggs was the new coach for their women’s sevens team. He was previously involved with China's men's sevens team in 2022.

== Honours ==
- Powergen Cup/Anglo-Welsh Cup titles: 1
  - 2005
