= Ulrich Förstermann =

German physician and pharmacologist

Ulrich Förstermann (born 4 April 1955) is a German physician and pharmacologist.

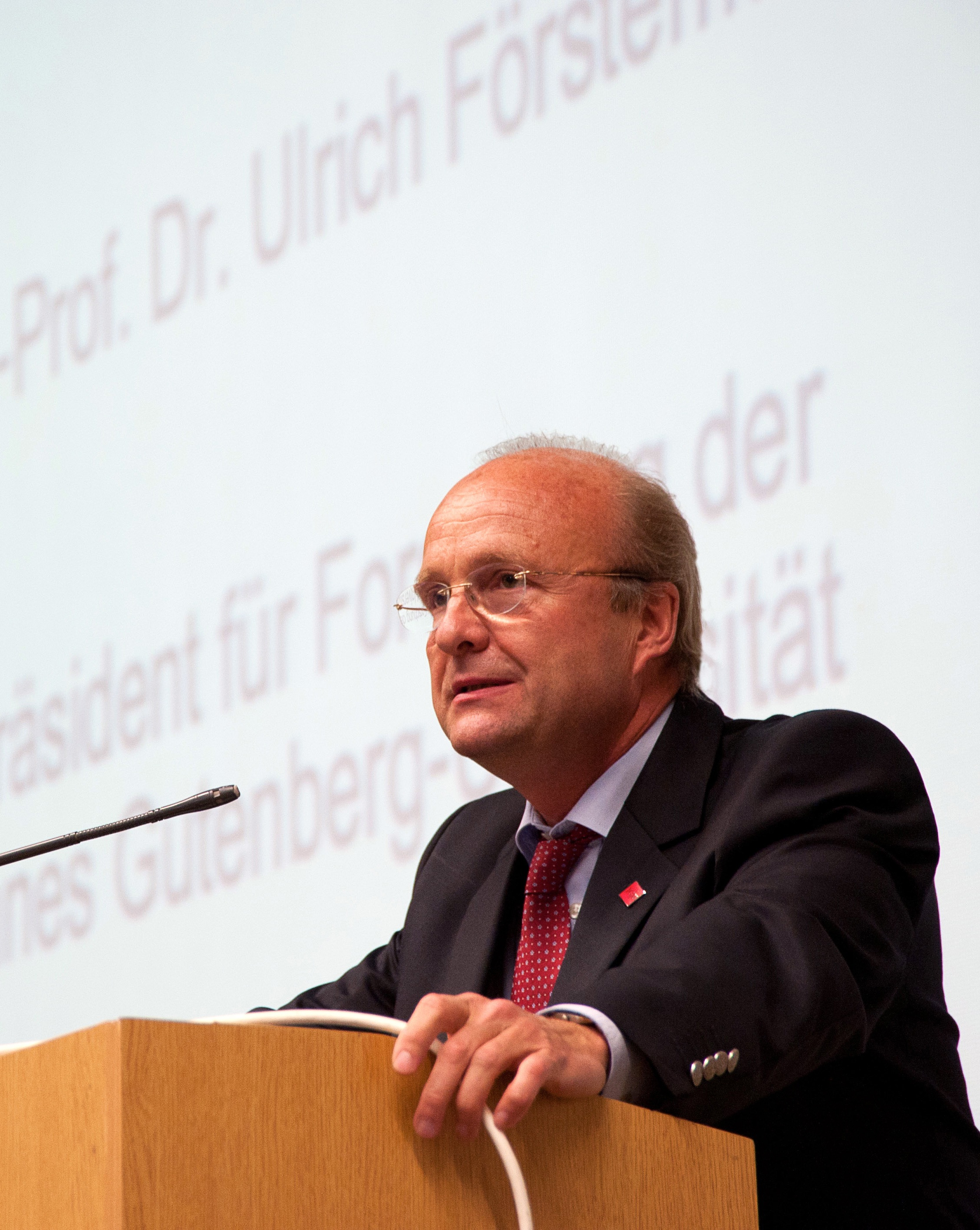
Ulrich_Forstermann_2012

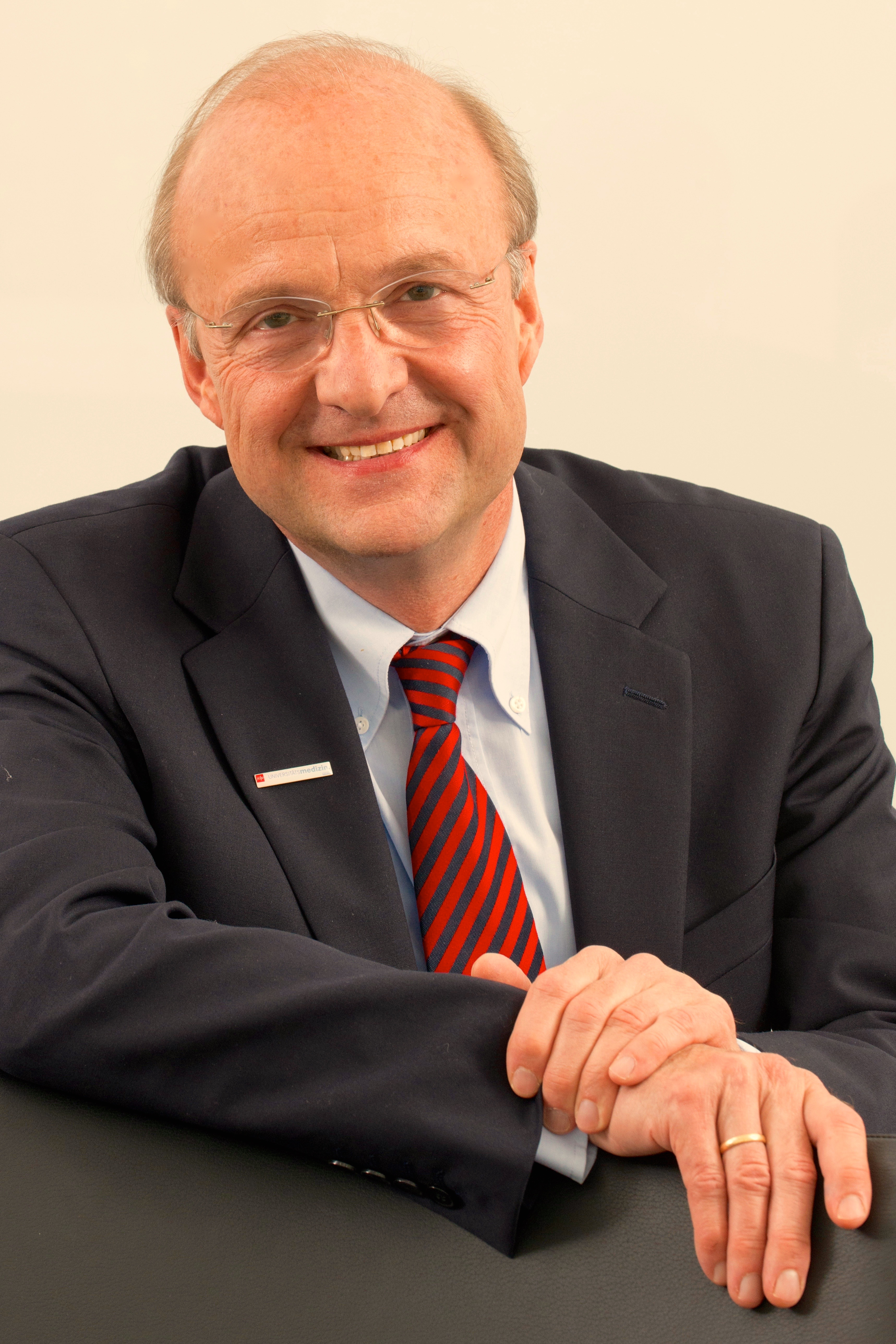
ULRICH FÖRSTERMANN 2015 Photo Peter Pulkowski

== Life ==
Förstermann was born in Hildesheim, Lower Saxony, Germany.

As of April 2013, Ulrich Förstermann holds the position of Chief Scientific Officer of the Johannes Gutenberg University Medical Center, Mainz, Germany, and is Dean of the Faculty of Medicine. From 2009 - 2013 he was Vice President for Research of the Johannes Gutenberg University, Mainz, Germany. Förstermann is also professor in the Department of Pharmacology Johannes Gutenberg University of Mainz. He accepted the Chair of Pharmacology in 1993 after declining an equivalent offer of the Johann Wolfgang Goethe University in Frankfurt, Germany. From 1989 to 1993 Förstermann worked at Abbott Laboratories, Abbott Park, Illinois, USA (with Nobel Laureate Ferid Murad). At the same time he held an adjunct professor of pharmacology appointment at Northwestern University, Chicago, Illinois. During the first two years, his stay in the US was supported by a Heisenberg Scholarship from the Deutsche Forschungsgemeinschaft (German Research Council), Bonn, Germany. From 1991-1993 Förstermann took over Abbott’s Vascular Biology Project as the Project Director. Previously (1984–1989), Förstermann worked at the Department of Clinical Pharmacology, Hannover Medical School, Hannover, Germany, first as an assistant professor and later (after obtaining his German lecturing qualification, the “Habilitation”) as an associate professor of pharmacology and assistant medical director. Förstermann holds an MD/PhD (pharmacology) degree from Albert Ludwig University of Freiburg, Freiburg, Germany, 1980. He also spent his early post-doctoral years (with Georg Hertting) at the Department of Pharmacology of the Albert Ludwig University of Freiburg.

== Research and professional activities ==
Ulrich Förstermann’s key research contributed to the understanding of endothelium-dependent relaxation of blood vessels (endothelium-derived relaxing factor), the identification of the enzymes "nitric oxide synthase" (EC 1.14.13.39) and the phenomenon of oxidative stress in the vasculature. He has published over 270 scientific papers in peer-reviewed journals which have been cited over 26,000 times; Ulrich Förstermann is one of the most cited pharmacologists; according to the webometrics platform (ranking web of universities) he has a Hirsch-index of 103 (in 2021). He is also co-author and co-editor of a major German language Pharmacology Textbook (Aktories, Förstermann, Hofmann, Starke, Allgemeine und spezielle Pharmakologie und Toxikologie, Elsevier, Munich, 2017 ISBN 978-3-437-42525-7. Ulrich Förstermann was President of the Federation of European Pharmacological Societies (EPHAR) from 2010 to 2012 and President-Elect of EPHAR from 2008 to 2010. Ulrich Förstermann was also Vice-Chairman of the Deutsche Gesellschaft für Pharmakologie (German Society for Pharmacology) from 2006 to 2011. Since 2011 Förstermann is member of the citizens' initiative Pro Kulturhauptstadt Freiburg.

== Awards and recognitions ==
Förstermann is the recipient of several awards and honors including the Goedecke/Warner Lambert Research Award from the Albert Ludwig University of Freiburg (1979); the Fritz Kuelz Award in Pharmacology from the German Society of Pharmacology and Toxicology (DGPT, 1986) [3]; the Rudolph Schoen Award from the Hannover Medical School (1989); a Heisenberg Scholarship from the Deutsche Forschungsgemeinschaft (German Research Council), Bonn, Germany (1989–1993, returned prematurely in 1991). In 2014, Förstermann was awarded the Rodolfo Paoletti Medal for Distinction in European Pharmacology by EPHAR. In 2017 he received the Ariëns Award of the Nederlandse Vereniging voor Farmacologie – Dutch Pharmacological Society for his groundbreaking research in the area of molecular pharmacology.,
