= Federation of European Pharmacological Societies =

The Federation of European Pharmacological Societies (EPHAR) is a non-profit voluntary association established to advance research and education in the science of pharmacology and to promote co-operation between national/regional pharmacological societies in Europe and surrounding countries. It is an umbrella organization of currently 29 national societies for pharmacology and represents over 12,000 individual pharmacologists in Europe. Moreover it seeks to co-operate with other international organizations, especially the International Union of Basic and Clinical Pharmacology (IUPHAR) of which EPHAR is an associate member.

== History ==
The efforts in the 1990s to unite European economical and political forces had found their counterpart in formation of European scientific federations. One of those scientific federations is EPHAR that was founded at the XIth International Congress of Pharmacology in Amsterdam (The Netherlands) in 1990. The establishment of the federation was prepared by a steering committee formed in 1988 under the initiative of Rodolfo Paoletti. The steering committee, headed by Börje Uvnäs, consisted of six members: Alasdair Breckenridge (UK), Flaminio Cattabeni (Italy), Gilles Fillion (France), Ove A. Nedergaard (Denmark), Rodolfo Paoletti (Italy), Hasso Scholz (Germany), Börje Uvnäs (Sweden). EPHAR was recognized as an affiliate member of IUPHAR in 1994. Since 1990, the Federation has sponsored important scientific events. In particular, EPHAR has contributed in the organization of residential courses with a restricted number of participants ("Molecular Biology in Pharmacology", Milan, 1990; "Neuroimmunomodulation in Pharmacology", Paris, 1992; "Electrophysiology in Pharmacology", London, 1993).

== Activities ==
Pharmacology is a multifaceted discipline extending from molecular biology at the one end to clinical pharmacology at the other. Collaborative efforts within all branches of biological sciences play a central role in the development and analysis of new drugs, and form a basis for the activities of EPHAR. Among the objectives of this federation is the training of new generations of pharmacologists with analytical skills and broad knowledge of modern medical and biological sciences.

The Federation seeks to achieve its objects by arranging instructional courses and training programs in matters connected with pharmacology, facilitating the exchange of scientific information between European pharmacologists (by encouraging the holding of joint meetings between European member societies), disseminating information and encouraging the participation to important activities organized by member societies. This will include the production of a calendar of the National and joint meetings of each European Society.

Another important goal of the Federation is establishing common standards for basic courses in pharmacology, and fixing minimal standards for a European Pharmacologist Certificate.

The scientific dissemination is a fundamental step in progress and advance in research and education. For this reason, the most important scientific events established by the Federation are the EPHAR Congresses. They include plenary lectures, symposia, round tables, oral and poster communications devoted to the most recent advances in pharmacology and related sciences and therefore represented the adequate forum for discussing preclinical, clinical and therapeutic data. Particular emphasis was given to the impact of biotechnologies on drug development and to the identification of novel pharmacological approaches to incurable diseases. Sessions were also held on drug development, strategies for research funding and training of pharmacologists.

The EPHAR Congresses that have taken place since EPHAR’s foundation are:

- 1st EPHAR Congress: Milan (Italy), 16–19 June 1995
- 2nd EPHAR Congress: Budapest (Hungary), 3–7 July 1999
- 3rd EPHAR Congress: Lyon (France), 6–9 July 2001
- 4th EPHAR Congress: Porto (Portugal), 14–17 July 2004
- 5th EPHAR Congress: Manchester (UK), 13–17 July 2008
- 6th EPHAR Congress: Granada (Spain), 17–20 July 2012
- 7th EPHAR Congress: Istanbul (Turkey), 26–30 June 2016
- 8th EPHAR Congress: Prague (Czech Republic), 5–8 December 2021-virtual meeting
- 9th EPHAR Congress: Athens (Greece), June 23-26, 2024

EPHAR supports activities, organized by its member societies that are intended to improve the cooperation among European pharmacologists. They are traditionally

- EPHAR Lectures
- EPHAR Symposia
- EPHAR Instructional Courses

One of these activities per year, for each country, is promoted by EPHAR. Calls for applications for these EPHAR-supported activities and the guidelines for these events are announced annually.

Moreover EPHAR gives prizes to European young investigators in the field of pharmacology, the EPHAR Young Investigators Awards. So far, the following awards were given:

- EPHAR Young Investigator Award 2010
- EPHAR Young Investigator Award 2012
- EPHAR Young Investigator Award 2014
- EPHAR Young Investigator Award 2017
- EPHAR Young Investigator Award 2019
- EPHAR Young Investigator Award 2021
- EPHAR Young Investigator Award 2023

== Executive committees ==
The term of the EPHAR Executive Committees is four years.

The present (2022–2026) Executive Committee is composed by the following members:

- President: María Jesús Sanz Ferrando (University of Valencia, Spain)
- Past President (2022–2024): Andreas Papapetropoulos (National and Kapodistrian University of Athens, Greece)
- Treasurer: Giuseppe Cirino (University of Naples Federico II, Italy)
- Secretary General: Nezahat Tugba Durlu-Kandilci (Hacettepe University, Turkey)
- Maria Jose Diogenes (University of Lisbon, Portugal)
- Peter Ferdinandy (Semmelweis University, Hungary)
- Stephan von Gunten (University of Bern, Switzerland)
- Clive Page (King's College London, UK)
- Thomas Wieland (University of Heidelberg, Germany)

Past Presidents were:

- 2022-2024: Andreas Papapetropoulos (Athens, Greece)
- 2020-2022: Mojca Kržan (Ljubljana, Slovenia)-interim president
- 2018-2020: Mojca Kržan (Ljubljana, Slovenia)
- 2016-2018: Robin Hiley (Cambridge, UK)
- 2014–2016: Thomas Griesbacher (Graz, Austria)
- 2012–2014: Filippo Drago (Catania, Italy)
- 2010–2012: Ulrich Förstermann (Mainz, Germany)
- 2008–2010: Eeva Moilanen (Tampere, Finland)
- 2006–2008: Arthur Weston (Manchester, UK)
- 2004–2006: Manfred Göthert (Bonn, Germany)
- 2002–2004: Alan W. Cuthbert (Cambridge, UK)
- 1997–2002: Flaminio Cattabeni (Milan, Italy)
- 1990–1997: Rodolfo Paoletti (Milan, Italy)

== Composition ==
The National Societies members of EPHAR are (in alphabetical order): • Austrian Pharmacological Society (Österreichische Pharmakologische Gesellschaft) APHAR. • Belgian Society of Fundamental and Clinical Physiology and Pharmacology. Société Belge de Physiologie et de Pharmacologie Fondamentales et Cliniques. Belgisch Genootschap voor Fundamentele en Klinische Fysiologie en Farmacologie. • Association of Pharmacologists of the Federation of Bosnia and Herzegovina. Udruženje Farmakologa Federacije Bosne i Hercegovine. • British Pharmacological Society (BPS). • Bulgarian Pharmacological Society. • Croatian Pharmacological Society. Hrvatsko Društvo Farmakologa. (HDF). • Czech Society for Experimental and Clinical Pharmacology and Toxicology. Česká Společnost pro Experimentální a Klinickou Farmakologii a Toxicologii (ČSEKFT). • Danish Society for Pharmacology, Toxicology and Medicinal Chemistry. Dansk Selskab for Farmakologi, Toksikologi og Medicinalkemi (DSFTM). • Dutch Pharmacological Society. Nederlands Vereniging voor Farmacologie (NVF) • Finnish Pharmacological Society. Suomen Farmakologiyhdistys. (SFY). • French Society of Pharmacology and Therapeutics. Société Française de Pharmacologie et de Thérapeutique. (SFPT). • German Society of Pharmacology. Deutsche Gesellschaft für Pharmakologie. (DGP). • Hellenic (Greek) Society of Basic and Clinical Pharmacology. Ελληνική Εταιρεία Φαρμακαλογίας (Ellinikí Etaireía Pharmakologías). • Hungarian Society for Experimental and Clinical Pharmacology. Magyar Kisérletes és Klinikai Farmakólogiai Társaság (MFT). • Israel Society for Physiology and Pharmacology (ISPP). • Società Italiana di Farmacologia (SIF). • Latvian Society of Pharmacology. Latvijas Farmakoloģijas biedrība. (LFB). • Norwegian Society for Pharmacology and Toxicology. Norsk Selskap for Farmakologi og Toksikologi. (NSFT). • Pharmacology Society of Malta. • Polish Pharmacological Society. Polskie Towarzystwo Farmakologiczne. (PTST). • Portuguese Pharmacological Society. Sociedade Portuguesa de Farmacologia (SPF). • Russian Scientific Society of Pharmacology. • Serbian Pharmacological Society. Српско Фармаколошко Друштво / Srpsko Farmakološko Društvo (СФД / SFD). • Slovak Pharmacological Society. Slovenská Farmakologická Spoločnosť (SFaS). • Slovenian Pharmacological Society. Slovensko Društvo Farmakologov. (SDF). • Spanish Society of Pharmacology. Sociedad Española de Farmacología (SEF). • Swedish Society for Pharmacology, Clinical Pharmacology and Therapeutics. Sektionen för Läkemedelslära. • Swiss Society of Pharmacology and Toxicology. Société Suisse de Pharmacologie et de Toxicologie/ Schweizerische Gesellschaft für Pharmakologie und Toxikologie (SSPT/SGPT). • Turkish Pharmacological Society. Türk Farmakoloji Derneği (TFD).
