= Joachim Drevs =

German medical specialist

- Born: August 16, 1966 (age 59); Konstanz, Germany
- Education: University of Göttingen
- Medical career
- Profession: Physician
- Institutions: University of Tübingen, University Medical Center Freiburg, Icahn School of Medicine at Mount Sinai
- Sub-specialties: Oncology
- Research: Combination chemotherapy

Joachim Drevs (born August 16, 1966) is a German medical specialist in internal medicine with a focus on hematology and oncology, as well as a university professor at the University Medical Center Freiburg and former leader of the Health Center at the University Clinic in Tübingen.

== Life ==
Drevs began studying human medicine at the Georg-August University in Göttingen in 1987. There he passed the state examination in 1994 and earned his doctorate under Clemens Unger. He received his medical license in March 1995. Afterwards he was engaged abroad furthering his specialization in oncology at the Klinik Bircher Foundation in Switzerland, at the Mount Sinai Hospital in New York, at the Sefako Makgatho Health Sciences University Clinic in South Africa. In 2005, he earned his postdoctoral qualification at the University Medical Center Freiburg in Freiburg, and in 2009 he was appointed as an adjunct professor at the same clinic. Today he is director of private clinic UNIFONTIS near Braunschweig, Germany and Majorca, Spain.

== Clinical focus ==
In Tübingen, Drevs established the first university health center in Germany, where the treatment of disease and the promotion of health were offered and practiced together. He concentrated on the implementation of new and innovative therapeutic treatments developed through clinical research on cancer and their clinical applications.

== Research ==
Drevs has conducted research on the topic of angiogenesis, and was present during the making of a new group of medications for the treatment of tumor patients called Molecular Targeted Therapy. He has also carried out research projects with James F. Holland, Gerd Nagel, and Hubert Blum.
