= Anton Vickerman =

British disc jockey and website operator

- Occupation: DJ
- Known for: Surfthechannel Operator

Anton Vickerman is a British disc jockey and website operator. He was the operator of Surfthechannel.com, a link site. He was sentenced to four years in jail following a privately funded legal campaign after British public prosecutors refused to try him. It has been called the first high-profile successful prosecution for the film industry. He is the first UK citizen sent to prison for linking to films and TV shows.

== Biography ==
Anton Vickerman lived in Gateshead, United Kingdom. He had previously worked as DJ in England and then on the Spanish island of Tenerife. He returned to England in 2001. He also worked as an engineer and a trainer for BT.

In addition to Surfthechannel, Vickerman operated the websites Supernova, SFD Hostings, Snarf It, Torrent Rat and Newzmonster. He is known variously by the names "Coco", "The Shadow" and "FD", under which latter name Vickerman is attributed as a major participant and factor in the closure of the first major torrent site, SuprNova.

== SurftheChannel.com ==
Surfthechannel.com was a popular link website for people seeking TV shows and movies. It had over 400,000 visitors a day. While the site hosted no videos, it organised a collection of links to infringing content. At the site's peak in mid-2009 it generated up to £50,000 ($78,500) per month in advertising revenue. He ran the website through Scopelight, which sent earnings to a bank account using an assumed name in Latvia. It was described as more popular than Facebook, though Judge Evans cited that the website was shown to be ranked 514th most popular in the world.

== Prosecution by FACT ==
Federation Against Copyright Theft (FACT) is a trade organisation in the United Kingdom established to represent the interests of its members in the film and broadcasting business on copyright and trademark issues. In 2007, FACT and the British police shuttered TV Links, a linking website that contained a video directory for television programs, films, and music videos. Owner David Rock was arrested for offences of facilitating copyright infringement, even though they were later changed to trademark infringement. David Rock was released without trial.

=== Discovery and raid ===
In order for FACT to close the site, it had to uncover who was operating the website, but Vickerman had used an anonymising service and offshore server space to conceal his identity. FACT hired investigator Pascal Hetzscholdt to identify Vickerman. On 10 July 2008, Hetzscholdt met Vickerman at a London hotel. Hetzscholdt wrote a report stating that Vickerman discussed plans to "experiment with using the BitTorrent network as the infrastructure to offer popular current films through STC." Vickerman denies this. This meeting would later be used as evidence in the trial, though FACT claims that no audio record exists. Vickerman wrote, "I am firmly of the belief that such an audio recording did exist but that it was 'disappeared' by FACT Ltd. due to it containing nothing controversial."

On 12 July, another FACT agent with covert recording equipment went to Vickerman house, which was on the market, and gained entry as a potential buyer. Other private information about Vickerman was also obtained.

On 18 August 2008, Northumbria police raided the home and arrested both Vickerman and his wife. FACT's involvement in the raid is shown in court documents. Vickerman told investigators that he believed the website was legal and "exempt from liability". Shortly thereafter, the Vickermans were released on bail.

On 1 September, an investigator from Bedfordshire Trading Standards Financial Investigations Unit showed up with an "asset restraint order". The relationship between the Bedfordshire Trading Standards Financial Investigations Unit (BTSFIU) and FACT is a deep one. The agency's form for asset confiscation notes that "priority will be given to those referrals that involve cinematic piracy." Vickerman also filed a Freedom of Information Act and found that "BTSFIU had made 23 similar restraint order applications in 2008, all on behalf of FACT." The asset freeze was cancelled a month later because Bedfordshire Trading Standard could not legally operate outside of Bedfordshire County.

=== Crown Prosecution Service weighs in ===
The Crown Prosecution Service refused to prosecute Vickerman. On 12 December 2008, an agent explained in a letter, that Vickerman's alleged crime was not publishing infringing material, but making it easier to find said material. It also suggested that civil law could act as a remedy. The letter concluded that "the evidence provided is too vague to establish what actual offences are alleged and thus I cannot advise any charge at this stage."

=== Private party trial ===
Anton Vickerman was criminally prosecuted by FACT under the right of private prosecution in the United Kingdom. Under private prosecution, the prosecuting party must bear all costs of the prosecution. The case was delayed due to applications for dismissal, disclosure, a stay of indictment over abuse of process, and for the DPP to take over the case. Vickerman charges that FACT "withheld key documents" from him that would help with his case, including the CPS letter. He petitioned government prosecutors to take over the prosecution, but was denied. The case which was supposed to be for October 2010 was pushed back. The third time it was set was for November 2011. This too was delayed because Vickerman had travelled to Majorca, but was unable to return due to a claimed medical condition.

The trial finally commenced in May 2012. Vickerman was optimistic because of the TV-Links case, where another judge had ruled that TV-Links had not infringed copyright. The trial lasted for eight weeks. David Walbank defended Vickerman. Ari Alibhai prosecuted the case. Vickerman was found guilty of "conspiracy to defraud" instead of copyright infringement.

Judge Evans made a reference to TV-Links, saying Vickerman "pressed on, knowing that TV-Links had been taken down following the intervention of FACT on the basis that what it had been doing was unlawful." Judge Evans claimed that Vickerman was arrogant for not shutting down his website until days before the lawsuit. Judge Evans took into account the industry's claims of damages, calling them speculative, but believed the loss had been in the millions of pounds.

=== Response ===
Loz Kaye, the Leader of the Pirate Party UK, said that the prosecution should not have been brought and was driven by private interests.

Kieron Sharp, of the Federation Against Copyright Theft, said: "Let's be clear, this is fraud and about the jobs of people who service the film industry, not one or two highly-paid actors."

Concerns over FACT and the case have been widespread. Timothy Lee, writing for Ars Technica, chronicles FACT's involvement in the case, from hiring private investigators, to organising and being involved in the raid, hiring the forensic investigator, and using a government entity created and funded by FACT to impose an unlawful asset freeze.

Concerns have been raised as to the effect on ongoing cases, specifically, the Richard O'Dwyer extradition case. Jimmy Wales says, "There is no connection between the two. The extradition court does not look at the merit of the charges. I don't see how this has any negative impact at all for O'Dwyer. It shows the copyright charge would not stick."

Another link site, UKNova TV, was sent a cease and desist letter from FACT and subsequently scaled back its operations and prevented users from sharing links, in the wake of Vickerman's conviction.

== Notes ==
=== Charges ===
In papers such as The Irish Times and Screen Daily, the charge is described as "facilitating copyright infringement" instead of "conspiracy to defraud", though other sources correctly attribute the correct ruling. In November 2012 Anton Vickerman admitted Contempt of Court in relation to material he caused to be published on the Internet on sentencing, and he received a further term of imprisonment.
