= Stephanie Zimmermann =

German physicist (1973–2020)

- Born: October 29, 1973
- Died: November 10, 2020 (aged 47)
- Citizenship: Germany
- Education: University of Freiburg
- Scientific career
- Fields: High energy particle physics
- Workplaces: CERN
- Thesis: High Rate and Ageing Studies for the Drift Tubes of the ATLAS Muon Spectrometer

Stephanie Zimmermann (October 29, 1973-November 10, 2020) was a German physicist who worked on the ATLAS experiment at the Large Hadron Collider at CERN. As a researcher from the University of Freiburg, she was involved in the Muon Detector Control System activities, and she served as muon run-coordinator. She was elected and served as ATLAS Run-Coordinator in 2012–2014. She then became Project Leader of the New Small Wheel project (NSW), part of an extensive upgrade, the largest phase 1 upgrade project for the ATLAS detector.

== Education ==
Zimmermann studied physics at the University of Freiburg, where she earned Master's and Ph.D. degrees, supervised by R. Schneider, Gregor Herten, and A. Bamberger.

== Career ==
As a master's student in 1999, Zimmermann joined the ATLAS experiment, working on the muon system of the Large Hadron Collider at CERN. She continued her work in the ATLAS collaboration during her doctoral thesis, a research fellowship at CERN, and as a University of Freiburg researcher.

=== Muon Run-Coordinator ===
As research fellow she coordinated integration of the Monitored Drift Tube and Resistive Plate Chambers. This work ensured this task was completed on time for installation in the ATLAS underground hall. According to Andrew Millington she was "a leading member of the ATLAS muon group", with a major role in the Muon Detector Control System activities, and she served as muon run-coordinator.

=== ATLAS Run-Coordinator ===
"The discovery of the Higgs of course gave a huge push also to the operations side, because if your detector doesn't work well, you don't have data to do your analysis."

— Stephanie Zimmermann

As ATLAS Run-Coordinator she was in charge of running the detector. Zimmermann said, "It was a very interesting phase because my first half in that role was the main part of data taking during the period up to the discovery of the Higgs. It was then followed by the first half of the shutdown with all the improvement works and managing the maintenance, and now also managing the start of getting things back together into a state for the run of 2015..."

=== New Small Wheel Project Leader ===
Zimmermann had also served as New Small Wheel (NSW) Project Leader. Bernd Stelzer of the ATLAS Muon Collaboration wrote that ATLAS is "undergoing an extensive upgrade program over the coming decade. The largest phase 1 upgrade project for the ATLAS Muon System is the replacement of the present first station in the forward regions with the so-called New Small Wheels." Auriane Canesse wrote that NSW is designed to produce approximately a seven-fold "increase in rejection rate for fake muon triggers and an improved muon momentum measurement at HL-LHC. According to Cristina Agrigoroae, "The New Small Wheels will allow much more stringent selection criteria for muons and provide new detector technology to handle the high backgrounds and high pile-up rates — the two main requirements for the High-Luminosity LHC." Zimmermann co-authored the University of Freiburg Detector Group report which said, "The present ATLAS Muon Spectrometer chambers are not able to cope with the background rates expected in the High Luminosity LHC phase; an upgrade is therefore needed, and will happen in two steps — first with a replacement of the innermost endcap muon stations with a new detector assembly known as the 'New Small Wheels', and in a second phase a replacement of chambers in the inner part of the barrel and a complete overhaul of the Muon electronics."

== Awards and honors ==
Zimmermann received university awards for the best master's thesis and also for the best 2004 doctoral thesis, which was titled, High Rate and Ageing Studies for the Drift Tubes of the ATLAS Muon Spectrometer.

She was also awarded the 2006 Marc Virchaux Prize "for best Ph.D. thesis concerned with the design and construction of, and the analysis of data from, the ATLAS muon spectrometer."

Zimmermann was elected ATLAS run coordinator for a two-year term, March 2012 – March 2014.

== Selected publications ==
As an ATLAS collaboration member, Zimmermann was an author on more than 900 publications. Two of the most significant are:

- ATLAS Collaboration (2012-09-17). "Observation of a new particle in the search for the Standard Model Higgs boson with the ATLAS detector at the LHC". Physics Letters B. 716 (1): 1–29. arXiv:1207.7214. Bibcode:2012PhLB..716....1A. doi:10.1016/j.physletb.2012.08.020. ISSN 0370-2693.
- ATLAS Collaboration; CMS Collaboration (2015-05-14). "Combined Measurement of the Higgs Boson Mass in рр Collisions at √s = 7 and 8 TeV with the ATLAS and CMS Experiments". Physical Review Letters. 114 (19) 191803. arXiv:1503.07589. doi:10.1103/PhysRevLett.114.191803. PMID 26024162.
