= Patriarch Daniel of Romania =

Patriarch of Romania since 2007

Daniel
- By God's mercy, Archbishop of Bucharest, Metropolitan of Muntenia and Dobrogea, Locum tenens of the throne of Caesarea Cappadociae and Patriarch of the Romanian Orthodox Church, His Beatitude Patriarch Daniel, Patriarch of All Romania
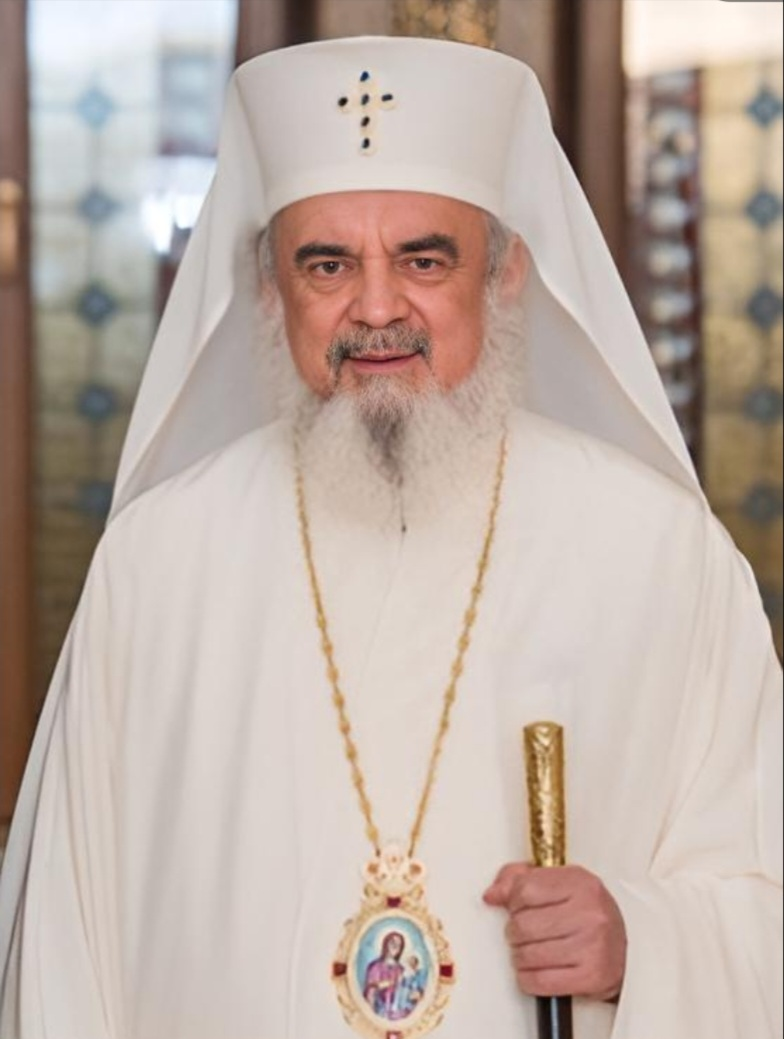
- Daniel in 2018
- Church: Romanian Orthodox Church
- See: Bucharest
- Installed: 30 September 2007
- Predecessor: Patriarch Teoctist of Romania
- Other posts: Archbishop of Iași and Metropolitan of Moldavia and Bukovina; Vicar bishop of Timișoara

Orders
- Ordination: 14 August 1987
- Consecration: 20 March 1990

Personal details
- Born: Dan Ilie Ciobotea; 22 July 1951 (age 75) Dobrești, Timiș County, Romanian People’s Republic
- Denomination: Eastern Orthodox Church
- Parents: Alexie Ciobotea; Stela Ciobotea
- Education: University Theologic Orthodox Institute of Sibiu; Bucharest Institute of Orthodox Theology; University of Strasbourg's Faculty of Protestant Theology; University of Freiburg's Faculty of Catholic Theology

Patriarch of the Romanian Orthodox Church
- Incumbent; Patriarch Daniel of Romania
- Style: His Beatitude
- Residence: Bucharest
- Formation: 1925
- First holder: Miron Cristea
- Website: patriarhia.ro

Daniel (Romanian pronunciation: [daniˈel]; born Dan Ilie Ciobotea [ˈdan iˈli.e tʃjoˈbote̯a] on 22 July 1951) is the Patriarch of the Romanian Orthodox Church.

The elections took place on 12 September 2007. Daniel won with a majority of 95 votes out of 161 against Bartolomeu Anania. He was officially enthroned on 30 September 2007 in the Patriarchal Cathedral in Bucharest. As such, his official title is "Archbishop of Bucharest, Metropolitan of Muntenia and Dobrogea, Locum tenens of the throne of Caesarea of Cappadocia, Patriarch of All Romania".

== Biography ==
Daniel Ciobotea was born in the village of Dobrești, Bara Commune, Timiș County, as the third son in the family of teacher Alexie and Stela Ciobotea.

He followed the Primary School in his home village (1958–1962) and the Gymnasium in Lăpușnic village (1962–1966), Timiș County. In 1966 he began the High School courses in Buziaș, which he then continued in Lugoj, at the "Coriolan Brediceanu" High School (1967–1970).

After passing his Baccalaureate exam, he then joined the university-level Theological Institute in Sibiu (1970–1974), where he obtained his degree in Theology with specialisation in the New Testament.

During the period 1974–1976 he followed the doctoral courses at the Theological Institute in Bucharest, Systematic Theology Section, under the supervision of Dumitru Stăniloae; he continued his studies abroad: two years at the Protestant Theology Faculty of the University of Strasbourg and another two years at the Albert Ludwig University in Freiburg im Breisgau, Catholic Theology Faculty.

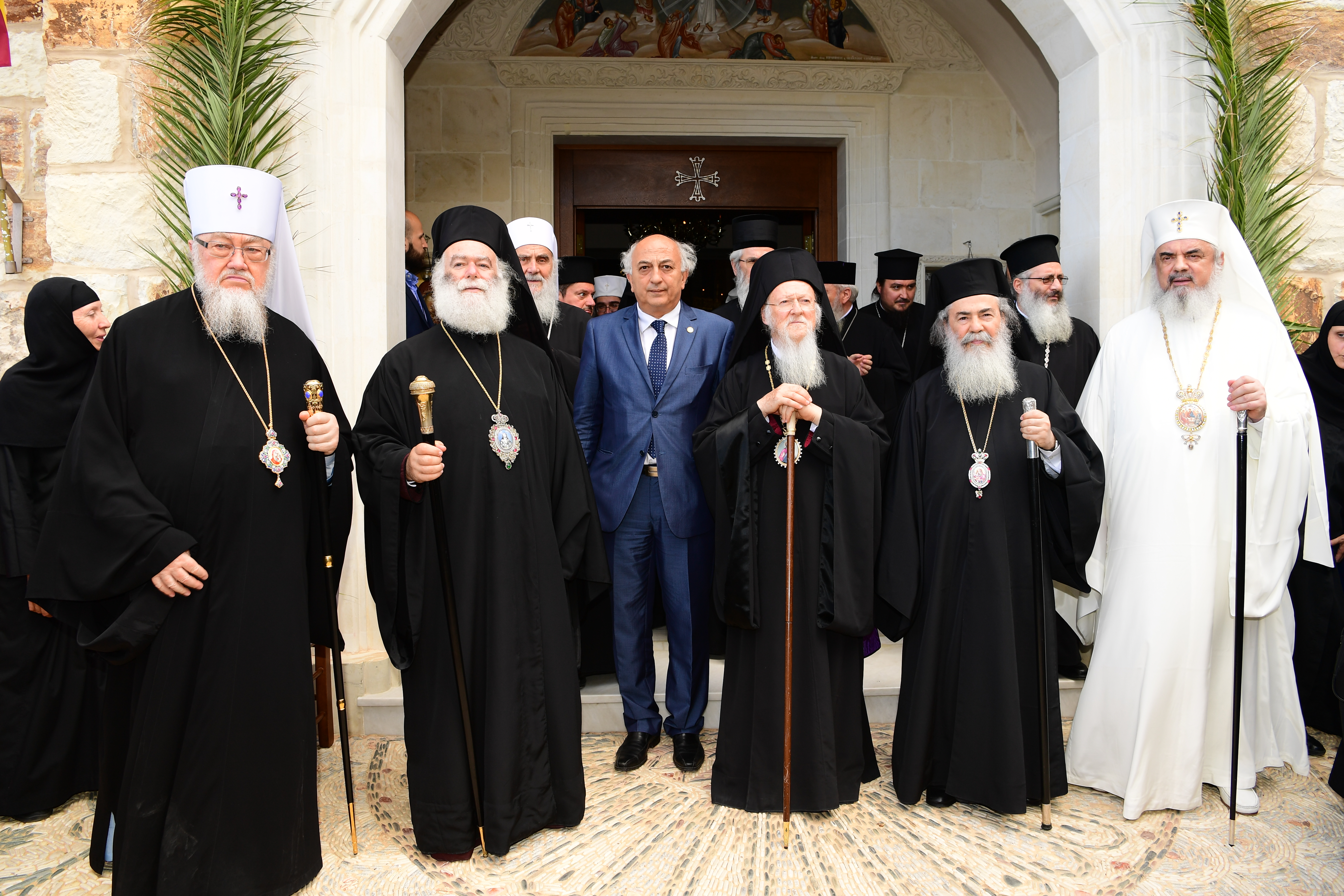
Patriarch Daniel of Romania and other leaders of the Eastern Orthodox Church with Deputy Minister of Foreign Affairs of Greece, Ioannis Amanatidis on the completion of the work of the Holy and Great Council of the Orthodox Church in Kolymvari, Crete, Greece.

His studies abroad prompted critics to argue that he collaborated with the Securitate, because during the rule of communist president Nicolae Ceauşescu, travelling and studying outside the Eastern Bloc was almost impossible for those who did not send informative notes to the Securitate. Mircea Dinescu of the CNSAS, however, said that his Securitate file was burnt in December 1989 and as such, it cannot be known whether he collaborated with it or not.

On 15 June 1979 he defended a Doctoral Dissertation at the Protestant Theology Faculty in Strasbourg, entitled: "Réflexion et vie chrétiennes aujourd'hui. Essai sur le rapport entre la théologie et la spiritualité, 424 pp." (Christian reflection and life today. Essay on the relationship between theology and spirituality, 424 pp) The dissertation was prepared under the supervision of two well-known French professors: Gerard Ziegwald and André Benoit and it received high praise. Thus he becomes Doctor of the Strasbourg University.

A more developed version of his doctoral dissertation was prepared under the guidance of his mentor, Dumitru Stăniloae and it was successfully defended on 31 October 1980 at the Orthodox Theological Institute in Bucharest under the title: "Teologie și spiritualitate creștină. Raportul dintre ele și situația actuală" (Theology and Christian spirituality. The relationship between them and the current situation).

Between 1980 and 1986, Dan Ilie Ciobotea served as lecturer at the Ecumenical Institute in Bossey, Switzerland, while from 1986 to 1988 he acted as the institute's Adjunct Director.

In 1987, he entered the monastic life in the Sihăstria Monastery in Romania and took the name Monk Daniel. He had the well-known spiritual Archimandrite Cleopa Ilie as his ‘monastic Godfather’.

In 1992, he started teaching theology at the Dumitru Staniloae Faculty of Orthodox Theology in the Al. I Cuza University in Iași.

Between 1 September 1988 – 1 March 1990, he was patriarchal counsellor and director of the Contemporary Theology and Ecumenical Dialogue Section in the Romanian Patriarchate.

In early 1990, he belonged to the short-lived Group for Reflection on Church Renewal where ironically he shared the same views for church reform with Bartolomeu Anania, who would become his rival in the race for patriarch in 2007.

In March 1990, Daniel was ordained as suffragan bishop of the Archbishopric of Timișoara. Three months later, in June 1990, he was appointed Metropolitan of Moldova and Bukovina.

He founded the influential Radio Trinitas in 1998. Daniel has also been questioned when using a paint-roller dipped in Holy Oil to bless new Radio and Television stations.

Between 5–8 October 2005, the Metropolitanate of Moldova and Bucovina co-organised with the Centre for Post-communist Studies (Canada, directed by Dr. Lavinia Stan and Dr. Lucian Turcescu) a prestigious international symposium on Church and State in Post-communist Eastern Europe.

On 12 September 2007, he was elected to take the lead of the Romanian Orthodox Church, after leading in all three rounds, ahead of the other candidates (Bartolomeu Anania, Metropolitan of Cluj and Ioan Selejean, Bishop of Covasna and Harghita).

Although appreciated for his intellectual skills and diplomacy, Daniel is regarded as a renovationist by traditionalists who accuse him of supporting ecumenism (considered a "heresy of our times"), and of planning to forcibly unite the Romanian Orthodox Church with the Roman Catholic Church, although he refuted the allegations in a public statement.

== Offices and honours ==
Styles of Patriarch Daniel of Romania
- Reference style: His Beatitude
- Spoken style: Your Beatitude
- Religious style: Patriarch

- 1980–1988 – Lector at the Ecumenical Institute in Bossey, Geneva and associate professor in Geneva and Fribourg, Switzerland;
- 1988 – Patriarchal Counselor, Director of the Sector of Contemporary Theology and Ecumenical Dialogue;
- 1988 – Conferent at the Catheder of Christian Mission of the Ecumenical Institute in Bucharest;
- 1990 (March) – elected and ordained Vicarius Bishop of the Archbishopric of Timișoara;
- 1990 (June) – elected as Archbishop of Iași and Metropolitan of Moldova and Bukovina;
- since 1992 – Theology professor at the Orthodox Theology Faculty "Dumitru Stăniloae" of the "Alexandru Ioan Cuza" University in Iași;
- Representative of the National Synodal Commission for Religious Education Bucharest;
- President of the Theology and Liturgics Commission of the Holy Synod of the Romanian Orthodox Church
- Honorary Member of the National Commission for Historical Monuments Bucharest;
- Member of the Central and Executive Committee of the Ecumenical Council of Churches (Geneva, 1991–1998);
- Member of the Presidium of Superior and Central Committee of the European Church Conference (since 1990);
- Vicepresident of the Second General Meeting of the European Churches Conference (Graz, 1997);
- Full Member of the International Academy of Religious Sciences in Brussels (2000).
- Honorary citizen of the city of Negrești-Oaș.
- 2022 – Honorary citizen of the city of Bucharest.

Eastern Orthodox Church titles
Preceded by Teoctist Arăpaşu	Patriarch of All Romania; 2007–present	Succeeded by incumbent
