= Magnus von Knebel Doeberitz =

Molecular oncologist and virologist

- Occupations: Physician and Professor of Molecular Oncology
- Awards: Ernst von Leyden Award for Cancer; Christoph-Wilhelm Hufeland Award for Cancer; Felix Burda Award

Academic background
- Education: M.D.
- Alma mater: University of Freiburg; University of Kiel

Academic work
- Institutions: Heidelberg University

Magnus von Knebel Doeberitz is a molecular oncologist and virologist, a professor of molecular oncology and medical director of the Department of Applied Tumor Biology at the Institute of Pathology at the University Hospital of Heidelberg. He also heads a Clinical Cooperation at the German Cancer Research Center.

Knebel Doeberitz has published over 300 research papers about viral and molecular carcinogenesis, early detection and prevention of cancer, novel prevention, and therapeutic concepts and tumor immunology.

Knebel Doeberitz received the Ernst von Leyden award in 1998, the Christoph-Wilhelm Hufeland award in 2000, the Distinguished Service Award for Cervical Cancer in 2006, and the Felix Burda award in 2015.

== Education ==
Knebel Doeberitz received his early academic education from the medical schools at Ghent in Belgium and then moved to Germany to study in the medical schools of Hamburg, Freiburg, and Kiel. From 1985 till 1994, he carried out his post-doctoral studies at the German Cancer Research Center in the Harald zur Hausen Laboratory. During this tenure, he received his Habilitation degree and teaching license for Medical Microbiology and Molecular Oncology.

== Career ==
After his post-doctoral studies, in 1995 Knebel Doeberitz joined the University of Heidelberg as a Professor of Molecular Oncology and Head of the Division of Molecular Diagnostics and Therapy in the Department of Surgery. In 2001, he was appointed as Medical Director of the Department of Applied Tumor Biology at the Institute of Pathology of the University Hospital Heidelberg.

Knebel Doeberitz served as a Scientific Advisor at Roche Diagnostics and Merck KGaA during the 1990s. In 1997, he co-founded LION bioscience Inc. and in 1999 he co-founded Molecular Tools in Medicine (MTM) Laboratories Inc. Since 2019 he has served as a member of the executive board of the Bioregion Rhein Neckar (BioRN).

== Research ==
Knebel Doeberitz's major scientific interests relate to mechanisms of human carcinogenesis by papillomaviruses and DNA mismatch repair deficiency, the identification of novel diagnostic markers and potential therapeutic targets as well as their clinical validation and translation into routine medical care.

Since the late 1980s, Knebel Doeberitz has investigated the role of human papilloma virus (HPV) encoded transcripts in cervical cancer cells and confirmed the oncogenic role of the viral E6 and E7 proteins in HPV associated human carcinoma cells.

In 1997, Knebel Doeberitz discovered that a cellular protein referred to as p16INK4a, is uniformly overexpressed in HPV-transformed cells and could be used as diagnostic tool to improve the early detection of cervical and other papillomavirus associated cancers. This work led to the development of the CINtec® product series at mtm-laboratories AG, a spin off company of the German Cancer Research Center co-founded by Knebel Doeberitz and later acquired by Roche.

=== DNA mismatch repair deficient cancers and Lynch syndrome ===
Knebel Doeberitz and his research team pioneered the role of insertion and deletion mutations (InDels) in cancers that arise via the loss of DNA-mismatch repair functions that are also referred to as microsatellite instable cancers (MSI+). He was the first to show that patients develop specific immune responses to altered proteins encoded by the genes affected by these InDels and demonstrated that MSI cancers in particular patients affected by the Lynch syndrome predominantly develop via immune evasion mechanisms. Based on these findings, Knebel Doeberitz and his team develops vaccination strategies against hereditary cancer syndromes like Lynch.

== Awards and honors ==
- 1998 - Ernst von Leyden Award for Cancer - Early Detection and Prevention
- 2000 - Christoph-Wilhelm Hufeland Award for Cancer - Early Detection and Prevention
- 2006 - Distinguished Service Award of Cervical Cancer, Eurogin Congress
- 2015 - Felix Burda Award

== Bibliography ==
=== Books ===
- Atlas of Histopathology of the Cervix Uteri (1991) ISBN 978-3540522959
- Color Atlas of Histopathology of the Cervix Uteri 2nd ed. (2006) ISBN 978-3642064333

=== Selected articles ===
- Klaes, R., Woerner, S.M., Ridder, R., Wentzensen, N., Duerst, M., Schneider, A., Lotz, B., Melsheimer, P. and Knebel Doeberitz, M. von, 1999. Detection of high-risk cervical intraepithelial neoplasia and cervical cancer by amplification of transcripts derived from integrated papillomavirus oncogenes. Cancer research, 59(24), pp. 6132–6136.
- Klaes, R., Friedrich, T., Spitkovsky, D., Ridder, R., Rudy, W., Petry, U., Dallenbach‐Hellweg, G., Schmidt, D. and Knebel Doeberitz, M. von, 2001. Overexpression of p16INK4A as a specific marker for dysplastic and neoplastic epithelial cells of the cervix uteri. International journal of cancer, 92(2), pp. 276–284.
- Klaes, R., Benner, A., Friedrich, T., Ridder, R., Herrington, S., Jenkins, D., Kurman, R.J., Schmidt, D., Stoler, M. and Knebel Doeberitz, M. von, 2002. p16INK4a immunohistochemistry improves interobserver agreement in the diagnosis of cervical intraepithelial neoplasia. The American journal of surgical pathology, 26(11), pp. 1389–1399.
- Wentzensen, N., Vinokurova, S. and Knebel Doeberitz, M. von, 2004. Systematic review of genomic integration sites of human papillomavirus genomes in epithelial dysplasia and invasive cancer of the female lower genital tract. Cancer research, 64(11), pp. 3878–3884.
- Zeller, G., Tap, J., Voigt, A.Y., Sunagawa, S., Kultima, J.R., Costea, P.I., Amiot, A., Böhm, J., Brunetti, F., Habermann, N. and Hercog, R., 2014. Potential of fecal microbiota for early‐stage detection of colorectal cancer. Molecular systems biology, 10(11), p. 766.
- Bergeron C, Ronco G, Reuschenbach M, Wentzensen N, Arbyn M, Stoler M, Knebel Doeberitz M. von, 2015. The clinical impact of using p16(INK4a) immunochemistry in cervical histopathology and cytology: an update of recent developments. Int J Cancer. 136(12). pp. 2741–51.
- Kloor M, Knebel Doeberitz M. von, 2016. The Immune Biology of Microsatellite-Unstable Cancer. Trends Cancer. 2(3), pp. 121–133.
