= Rob Vickerman =

English rugby union player

- Born: 25 September 1985 (age 41)
- Height: 1.80 m (5 ft 11 in)
- Weight: 89 kg (14 st 0 lb)

Rugby union career
Youth career
- Leeds Carnegie Academy
Senior career
Years	Team	Apps	(Points)
2005–2009	Leeds Carnegie		
2009-11	Newcastle Falcons		
National sevens team
Years	Team		Comps
2004–	England		32

Rob Vickerman (born 25 September 1985) is a rugby union player who played for the England Sevens team (Captain), Newcastle Falcons and Leeds Tykes. He played at centre.

Since finishing playing he has become a broadcaster for a range of channels including BBC, Radio 5 Live, Channel 5, Sky Sports and World Rugby. He commentates on both Sevens and Fifteens and has covered both the 2014 and 2018 Commonwealth Games, 2016 Rio and 2020 Olympics in Tokyo, as well as the 2019 Rugby World Cup in Japan. He commentated on both the Wrestling and Sport Climbing Olympic disciplines in Tokyo 2020 crossing into the different sports as a lead commentator.
