= Our Lady and St Edward's Church, Driffield =

Church in Driffield, East Riding of Yorkshire, England

Coordinates: 54°00′25″N 0°26′35″W

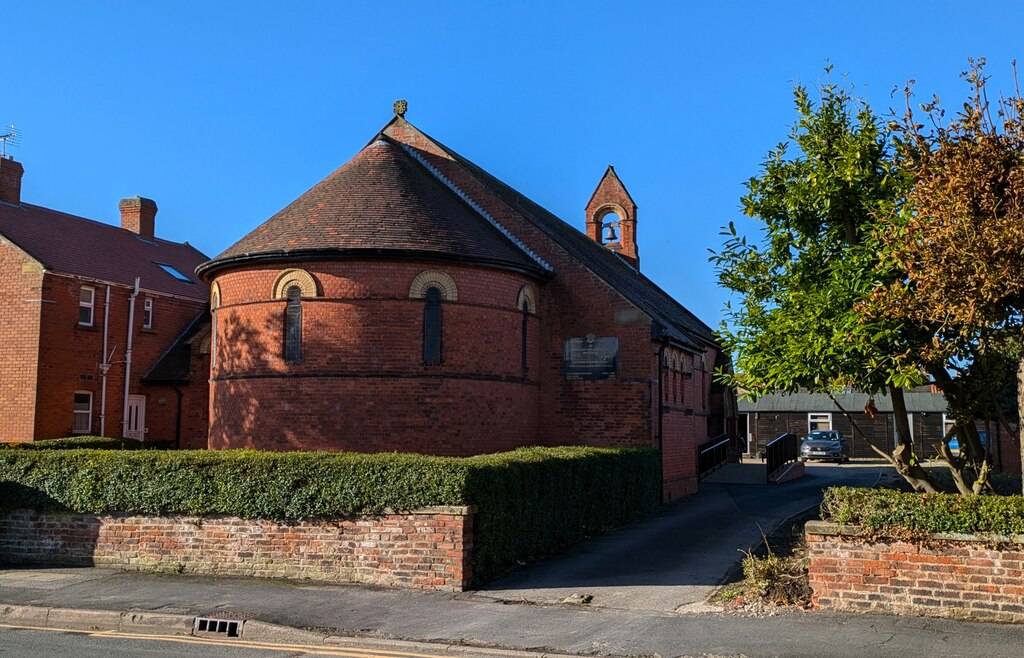
The church, in 2024

Our Lady and St Edward's Church is a Catholic church in Driffield, a town in the East Riding of Yorkshire, in England.

Catholics worshipped in a house in Driffield, then in Driffield Corn Exchange. In 1886, a church was constructed, to a design by Edward Simpson. Various stained glass windows were installed between 1893 and 1919. In the 1910s or 1920s, a presbytery was built, adjoining the church to the south. The church was grade II listed in 2015.

The church is built of red brick, with yellow terracotta dressings and a tile roof, and is in Romanesque style. It consists of a nave with a north porch and vestry, and a chancel with a north chapel and an apse. At the west end is a gabled bellcote. The entrance in the porch is round-arched, with three orders containing dogtooth, chevron and nail head decoration. Inside, the chancel and sanctuary arches are similarly decorated. The altar and altar rail are in stone, there are oak pews, and a large painting of the Virgin and Child, believe to be a copy of a 16th-century Italian painting. The interior brickwork is painted: cream in the nave, and turquoise in the sanctuary.

== See also ==
- Listed buildings in Driffield
