= Driffield Castle =

Former castle in the East Riding of Yorkshire, England

Coordinates: 54.010495°N 0.439334°W

Driffield Castle is located in the town of Driffield, approximately 12 miles (19 km) north of Beverley, East Riding of Yorkshire, England (grid reference TA 02372 58291).

It was a Norman earthwork motte and bailey fortress which was founded by Hugh d'Avranches, 1st Earl of Chester. It was re-fortified in the 13th century. The motte was damaged by 19th-century quarrying, and houses have encroached on the bailey.

The site listing in Historic England notes that excavations in the 19th century and in 1975 revealed the remains of a Roman occupation dating to the fourth century AD, underlying the motte. Driffield 19th-century archaeologist John Robert Mortimer noted fragments of medieval swords, spears and silver coins. A reference to Driffield in the Anglo-Saxon Chronicle suggests that this is also the site of a rare eighth-century Northumbrian palace, and the site is known to have been part of the royal demesne from the 11th to 15th centuries AD.

The castle and surrounding 2.33-acre site was sold at auction in 2011.

Only earthworks now remain and the site is known as Moot Hill.
