= Driffield Masonic Hall =

Building in Driffield, East Riding of Yorkshire, England

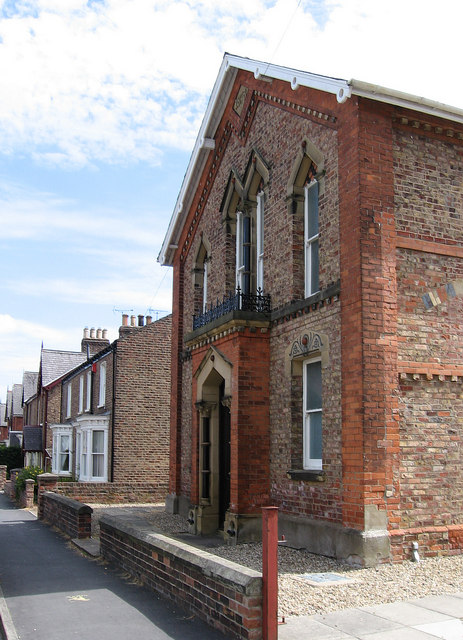
The building, in 2011

Driffield Masonic Hall is a historic building in Driffield, a town in the East Riding of Yorkshire, in England.

The building lies on the south side of Lockwood Street in Driffield. It was constructed in 1878 by John Robert Mortimer as a museum, to house his archaeological finds. Mortimer went bankrupt in 1887, but the museum operated until 1918, when the collection was sold to Hull City Council. The building was then converted into a masonic hall, and was altered later in the century. The building was grade II listed in 1996.

The hall is built of brick on a chamfered plinth, with dressings in orange brick and stone, pilasters between the bays, dentilled eaves and a Welsh slate roof. The gable end faces the street, and in the centre is a projecting porch with black marble columns and foliate capitals, an opening with a triangular head and a circular ornament in red marble, and above are ornate iron balcony railings. The windows are sashes with incised strapwork decoration, and circular red marble ornaments. The upper floor windows have triangular heads, those in the centre paired and separated by a black marble column. In the gable, which has ornate bargeboards, is a diamond-shaped plaque with a datestone.

== See also ==
- Listed buildings in Driffield
