= East Riding General Hospital =

Hospital in the East Riding of Yorkshire, England

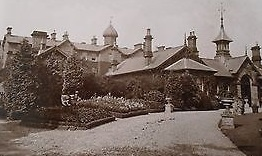
- East Riding General Hospital

- Shown in East Riding of Yorkshire

Geography
- Location: Bridlington Road, Driffield, East Riding of Yorkshire, England
- Coordinates: 54.0121°N 0.4244°W

Organisation
- Care system: NHS

Services
- Emergency department: No

History
- Founded: 1868
- Closed: 1990

Links
- Lists: Hospitals in England

East Riding General Hospital was a health facility in Bridlington Road, Driffield, East Riding of Yorkshire, England.

== History ==
The facility had its origins in the Driffield Union Workhouse which was designed by John Edwin Oates and opened in 1868. An infirmary was established at the north end of the site. It became the Driffield Public Assistance Institution in 1930. During the Second World War, an emergency medical service hospital known as Driffield Base Hospital was built on the site. It joined the National Health Service as the East Riding County Hospital in 1948 and became the East Riding General Hospital in 1950. As it expanded it took over many of the old workhouse buildings and modern operating theatre facilities were also built on the site in the 1960s. After local services had transferred to the Alfred Bean Hospital, East Riding General Hospital closed in 1990. The buildings were demolished in 1992 and the site was sold for residential development.
