= Bell Hotel, Driffield =

Hotel in Driffield, East Riding of Yorkshire, England

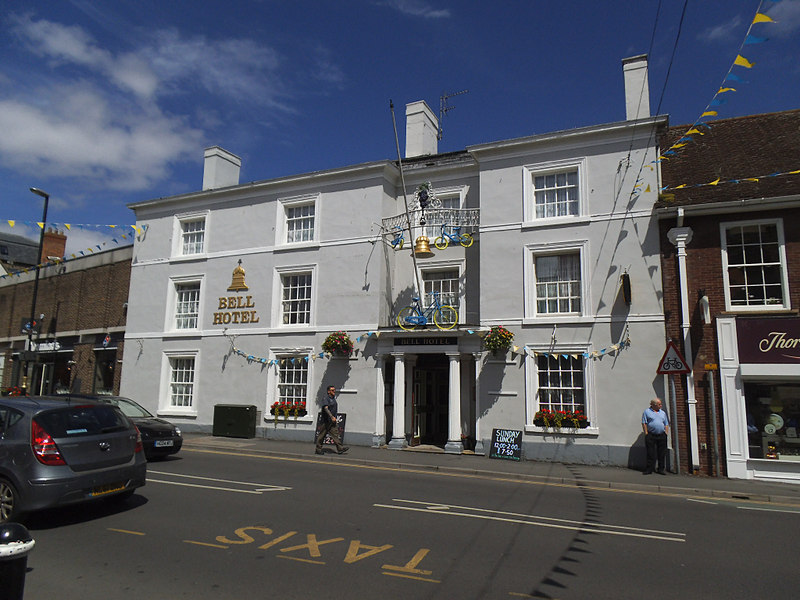
The building, in 2017

The Bell Hotel is a historic building in Driffield, a town in the East Riding of Yorkshire, in England.

The building operated as an inn and shop in the 18th century, and from 1772 housed the town's first post office. It was rebuilt in the early 19th century as a hotel. It also operated as a corn exchange until a purpose-built structure opened in 1841. From 1975 until 2025, it was owned by George and Rita Riggs, then in 2026 it was purchased by Clear Summer Hospitality. It has 22 bedrooms, a bar and restaurant, and leisure facilities. The building was grade II listed in 1985.

The hotel is built of rendered and colourwashed brick with stone dressings, sill bands, a moulded eaves cornice and a slate roof. It has two storeys and is four bays wide. The third bay is recessed, and contains a Doric porch with twin detached columns and flanking pilasters. The windows are sashes with architraves. Above the porch is a decorative wrought iron screen incorporating a bunch of grapes and vine leaves, and a suspended bell. Inside, the original staircase survives.

== See also ==
- Listed buildings in Driffield
