= Tiger Inn, Driffield =

Pub in Driffield, East Riding of Yorkshire, England

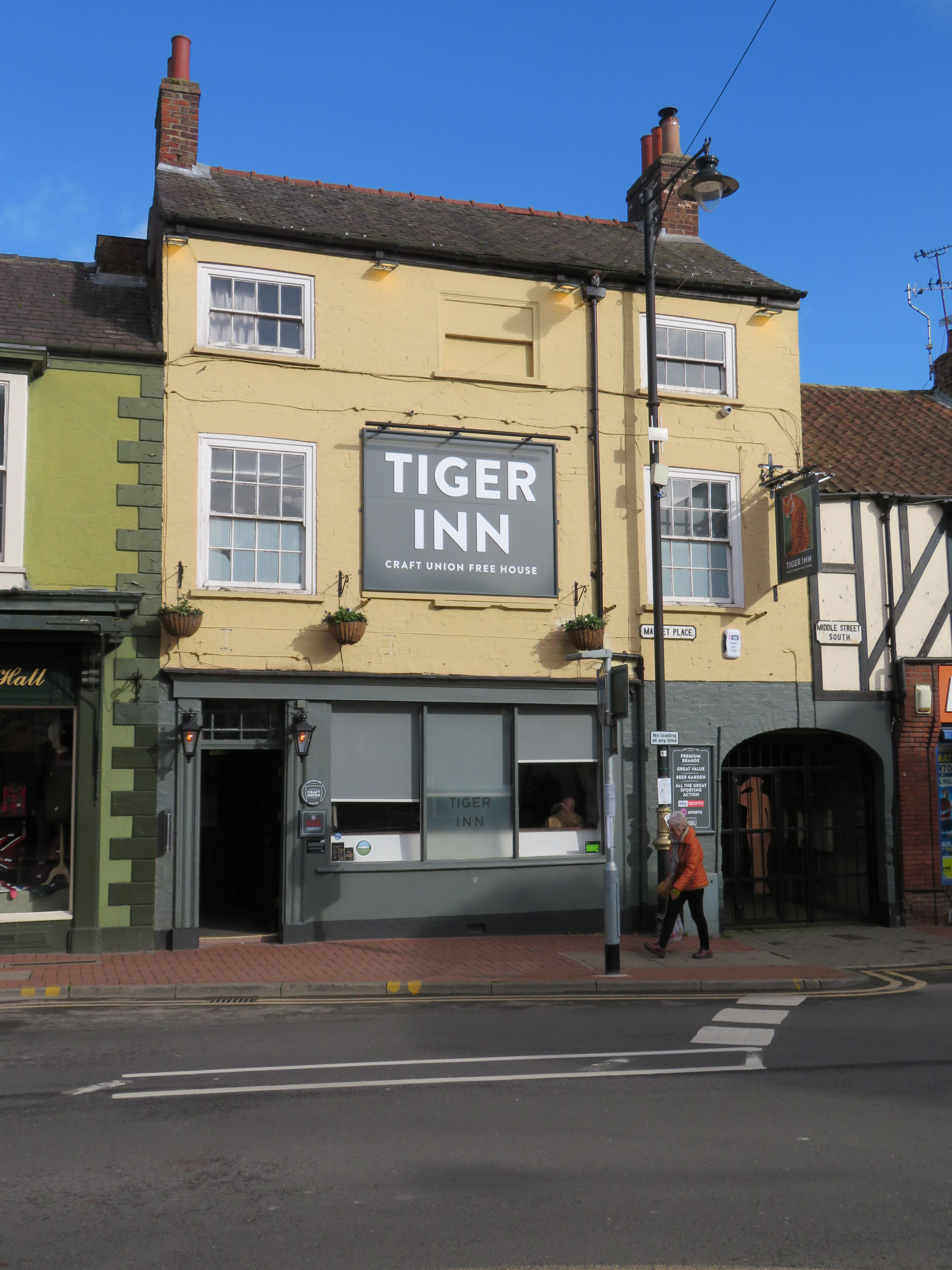
The pub, in 2024

The Tiger Inn is a historic pub in Driffield, a town in the East Riding of Yorkshire, in England.

The pub lies on the east side of the Market Place. It was built in 1823, and in the 20th century a shop front was inserted at ground floor level. It was grade II listed in 1985. In 2023, it was renovated by the Craft Union Pub Company, at a cost of £196,000. In addition to the square-shaped bar with bench seating at the rear, it has a beer garden, and hosts social events and darts matches.

The public house is built of whitewashed brick, with stone dressings and a slate roof. It has three storeys and is three bays wide. On the left is a doorway with flute pilasters and a rectangular fanlight. To its right is a shopfront, and further to the right is a segmental-arched carriage entrance. Above, the middle bay contains blocked openings, the outer bays have sash windows, and all have cambered wedge lintels.

== See also ==
- Listed buildings in Driffield
