= Riverhead Court =

Building in Driffield, East Riding of Yorkshire, England

Coordinates: 54°00′05″N 0°25′58″W

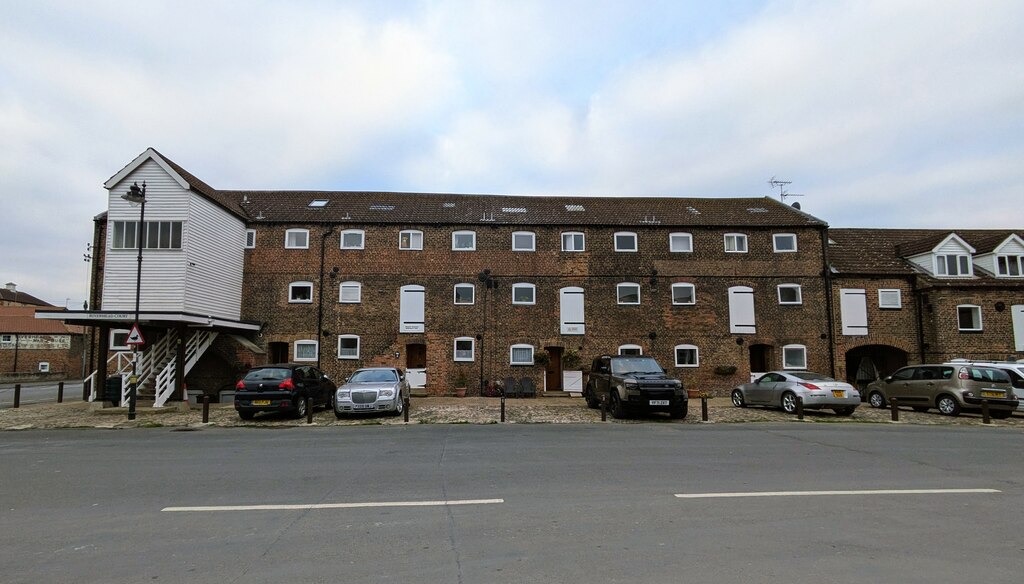
The building, in 2024

Riverhead Court is a historic building in Driffield, a town in the East Riding of Yorkshire, in England.

The Driffield Navigation was completed in 1770, connecting the town with the River Hull. A group of warehouses were constructed at the head of the canal over the next few decades, including a large granary, which was completed before the end of the century. The granary fell out of use in the 20th century, and in 1974 it was converted into 22 flats. The remodelling was commissioned by Riverton Properties and designed by MacCormac and Jamieson. The building was grade II listed in 1985.

The building is constructed of brick with a bracketed timber eaves cornice, and a pantile roof with raised coped gables. There are three storeys and a basement, a rectangular plan, and 13 bays. The ground floor contains doorways, on the middle floor are loading doors, and all the floors contain pivoted sash windows; all the openings have segmental heads. On the second bay is a gabled timber framed weatherboarded gantry approached by timber stairs.

== See also ==
- Listed buildings in Driffield
