= Towthorpe =

Towthorpe could be a community in England:

- Towthorpe, East Riding of Yorkshire
- Towthorpe, North Yorkshire
