= John Robert Mortimer =

English corn merchant and archaeologist

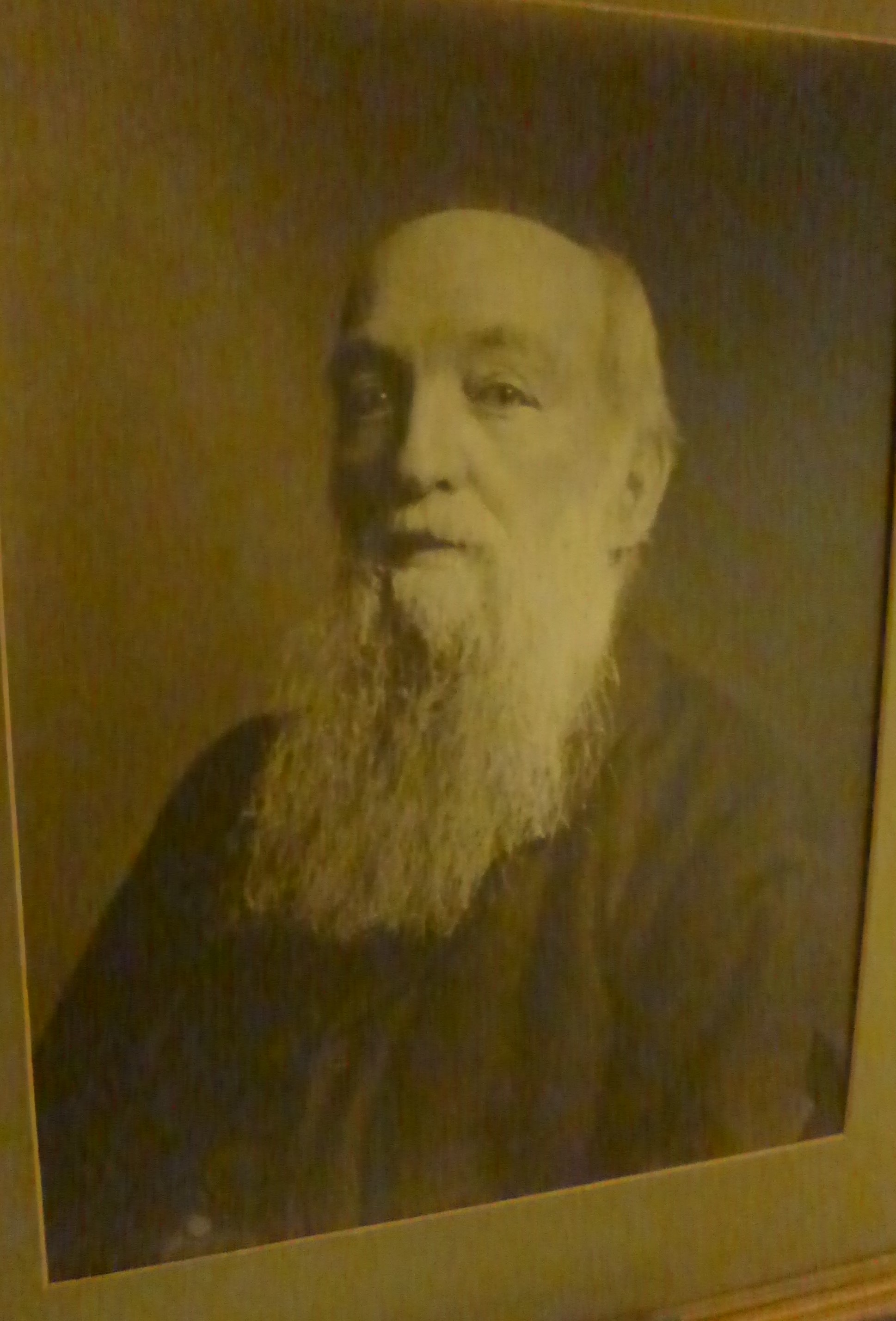
- Born: 15 June 1825; Fimber, East Riding of Yorkshire, England
- Died: 19 August 1911 (aged 86); Driffield, East Riding of Yorkshire, England
- Occupation: Corn chandler
- Known for: Archaeological excavations and museum

John Robert Mortimer (15 June 1825 – 19 August 1911) was an English corn-merchant and archaeologist who lived in Driffield, East Riding of Yorkshire.

He was responsible for the excavation of many of the notable barrows in the Yorkshire Wolds, including Duggleby Howe, recorded in the work Forty Years Researches in British and Saxon Burial Mounds of East Yorkshire.

He established a dedicated museum of archaeology at Driffield, one of the first of its kind. His excavations represent early examples of the application of scientific methods to the study of burial mounds; his written work and excavated finds remain a valuable resource in British archaeology.

== Biography ==
John Robert Mortimer was born at Fimber in the Yorkshire Wolds on 15 June 1825, the eldest of three children of a local farmer; he received a village school education at Fridaythorpe. In adult life he operated as a corn merchant, moving to the nearby larger town of Driffield in 1869; in the same year marrying Matilda née Mitchell, daughter of the vicar of Sancton and of Holme on the Wolds. His business included trade in seed, manure and fertiliser, and included Mortimer's Warehouse, malt kilns and a brewery as assets.

Mortimer's interest was stimulated by visits to the 1851 Great Exhibition, and the geological and archaeological exhibits in the British Museum, and by the private collection of Edward Tindall of Bridlington. (Note: Edward Tindall (d.1877), of Bridlington, collector of geologic and archaeologic specimens. Some of Tindall's collection were found to be modern, and from the hand of Edward Simpson (aka Flint Jack), a contemporary manufacturer of flint tools, also known as a forger. Tindall also excavated barrows in the Yorkshire Wolds, and investigated the fossil record of the area.) Together with his brother Robert, Mortimer assembled a small collection of fossil and antiquarian specimens; they also trained and instructed many local farm workers to collect any likely specimens they found; locally such artefacts became known colloquially as 'Mortmers'. During the latter part of the 19th century the area became a magnet for collectors, in part due to publicity from his collection; most sought ancient stone, flint and bronze weapons. Competition arose for these artefacts, causing a rise in their monetary value. Through their contacts with local agricultural workers the Mortimers were able to collect a great many thousands of specimens.

In the late 1850s, Mortimer began recording the linear earthworks of the local area. In the 1860s, he began to excavate barrows; his first excavation was 4 May 1863 at High Towthorpe. (Note: The site was designated as a scheduled monument in 1966) Many of his excavations took place between 1863 and 1879, and were self-financed from his own business; in 1878 Mortimer opened a purpose built museum in Driffield.

After the 1870s, an agricultural depression caused the price of grain to decrease (see Repeal of the 1846 Corn Laws), he became bankrupt in 1887 owing £1,800; the expenditure on the museum, and on excavation both contributing significantly. Mortimer continued to excavate, but often under the financial backing of other persons.

Over his archaeological career he excavated over 300 such mounds, the bulk of his work was recorded in his magnum opus "Forty Years' Researches in British and Saxon Burial Mounds of East Yorkshire" (1905). He also excavated the Iron Age graveyard known as Danes Graves, or Danesdale. Mortimer sometimes worked with his brother Robert, and also worked with the antiquarians Canon William Greenwell and Thomas Boynton.

John Robert Mortimer died at home in Driffield on 19 August 1911. He had six children, five of whom survived him.

== Scientific method and legacy ==
Mortimer's fieldwork and recording compares favourably with his contemporaries. His investigations include the recording of crop marks, and made plaster casts of post holes on site. He made stratigraphic observations, but these often lacked detail, some of his reporting has been shown to contain errors by later investigations. Mortimer made good records of his work, he was aided in Forty Years' Researches.. by his daughter Agnes Mortimer, an artist, who when she was still a teenager did the sketches of her father's antiquities later published in the book. Mortimer credits Agnes in the preface to his volume: "For the sketches of the specimens figured in this book, and for numerous illustrations used elsewhere, I am solely indebted to my daughter Agnes, who from the time she was thirteen years of age until she was nineteen, devoted many of her leisure hours to the completion of this, which at her age, must have been a tedious and irksome task.”

Mortimer applied the scientific method to his work in an attempt to infer the past, rather than being a pure collector of curiosities. Though initially driven by curiosity he was also motivated a desire to gain and preserve knowledge of ancient inhabitants of the land; he was concerned that much evidence was being increasingly rapidly destroyed by changes in farming methods, such as intensive ploughing. Harrison (2009) comments that "[Mortimer] can be regarded as one of the earliest rescue archaeologists".

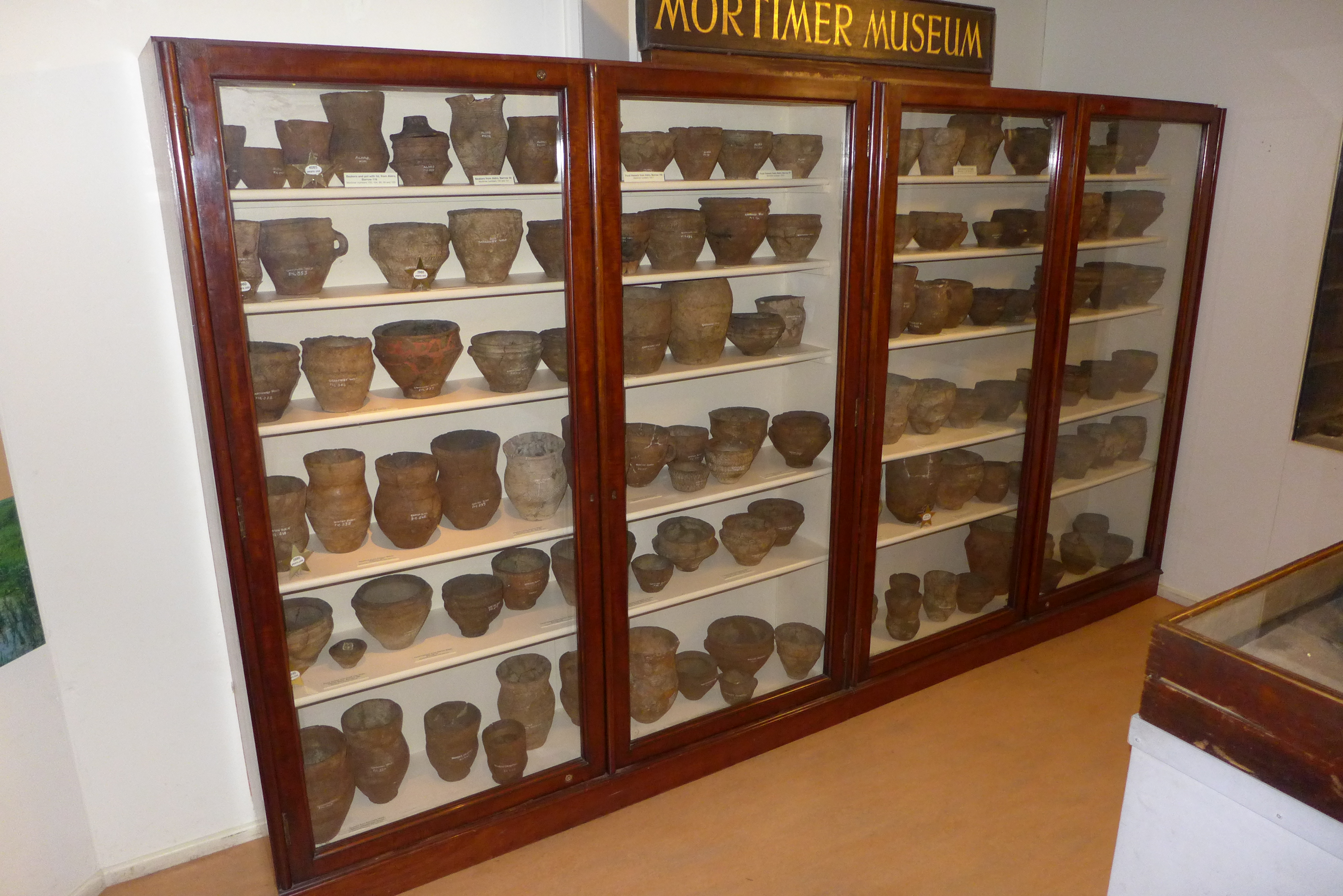
A Mortimer case in the Hull and East Riding Museum

In 1913, the Mortimer collection was acquired by Colonel G.H. Clarke and given to the City of Hull. From 1929, the collection was displayed in the Victoria Galleries (part of Hull City Hall), as the Mortimer Museum. It was transferred to the Transport and Archaeology Museum on High Street in 1956. (Note: Since 1989 named The Hull and East Riding Museum) It now forms an important part of the collection of the Hull and East Riding Museum, and remains an important contribution to British prehistoric archaeology. The Mortimer collection contains over 66,000 provenanced pieces from barrows, and a further several thousands of un-provenanced surface finds.

Masonic Hall, Lockwood Street, Driffield

Mortimer's Driffield museum was an early example of a purpose built museum, it later functioned as a Masonic Lodge, and is now known as the 'Masonic Hall'. It became a listed building in 1996.

=== Works ===
- Mortimer, J. R. (1897). "A Summary of What is Known of the so-called " Danes' Graves," near Driffield". Proceedings of the Yorkshire Geological Society. 13 (3): 286–298. Bibcode:1897PYGS...13..286M. doi:10.1144/pygs.13.3.286.
- Mortimer, J. R. (1898), Report on the opening of a number of the so-called "Danes' Graves," at Kilham, E.P. Yorks, and the discovery of a chariot-burial of the Early Iron Age
- Mortimer, J. R. (1900). "Notes on the History of the Driffield Museum of Antiquities and Geological Specimens". Proceedings of the Yorkshire Geological Society. 14 (1): 88–96. Bibcode:1900PYGS...14...88M. doi:10.1144/pygs.14.1.88.
- Mortimer, J. R., "Account of the discovery of Roman remains at Langton", East Riding Antiquarian Society Transactions (10)
- Mortimer, J. R., "Stature of early man in east Yorkshire", East Riding Antiquarian Society Transactions (17)
- Mortimer, J. R., "Danes' Graves", East Riding Antiquarian Society Transactions (18)
- Mortimer, J. R. (1903), "Notes on some pre-historic jet ornaments from East Yorkshire", The Naturalist
- Mortimer, J. R.; Mortimer, Agnes (1905), Forty Years Researches in British and Saxon Burial Mounds of East Yorkshire, A. Brown and Sons: London
- Mortimer, J. R. (1905), "Notes on British remains found near the Cawthorne camps, Yorks", The Naturalist
- Gomme; Mortimer, J. R. (1906), "Notes: on the history of the Driffield museum of antiquities and geological specimens", Hull Scientific and Field Naturalists' Club Transactions (1): 136–141
  - also in Yorkshire Geological Society Proceedings (14)
- Mortimer, J. R. (1908), "Note on a British burial at Middleton-on-the-Wolds", The Naturalist
- Mortimer, J. R. (1910), "Opening of a Barrow near Borrow Nook", Opening of a Barrow Near Borrow Nook (20), ISSN 0084-4276
- Mortimer, J. R. (1911), "The evolution of the millstone", The Naturalist
- Mortimer, J. R. (1911), "Notes on the stature, etc., of our ancestors in east Yorkshire", The Naturalist

Memoirs

- Mortimer, J. R. (1978) [1903], Hicks, John D. (ed.), "A Victorian Boyhood on the Wolds: The Recollections of J. R. Mortimer", East Yorkshire Local History Series, no. 34, unpublished until 1978

== See also ==
- William Greenwell, Augustus Pitt Rivers, Thomas Bateman, Heywood Sumner John Lubbock, 1st Baron Avebury, John Evans, contemporary archaeologists, geologists, and antiquarians
- List of archaeologists
