= Listed buildings in Driffield =

Driffield is a civil parish in the county of the East Riding of Yorkshire, England. It contains 38 listed buildings that are recorded in the National Heritage List for England. Of these, one is listed at Grade I, the highest of the three grades, one is at Grade II*, the middle grade, and the others are at Grade II, the lowest grade. The parish contains the market town of Driffield, the village of Little Driffield and the surrounding area. The Driffield Navigation runs through the parish, and the listed buildings associated with it are a lock, two cranes, and warehouses, one converted for residential use. Most of the other listed buildings are houses, cottages and associated structures, and the rest include three churches, a hotel and public houses, a pinfold, a shop and a former museum.

== Key ==
Grade	Criteria
I	Buildings of exceptional interest, sometimes considered to be internationally important
II*	Particularly important buildings of more than special interest
II	Buildings of national importance and special interest

== Buildings ==
Name and location	Photograph	Date	Notes	Grade
All Saints' Church; 54.00780°N 0.44194°W		12th century	The church has been altered and extended through the centuries, including alterations by George Gilbert Scott junior in 1878–80. It is built in stone, with roofs of slate and lead, and consists of a nave with a clerestory, north and south aisles, a south porch, a chancel with a north chapel, and a west tower. The tower has three stages, a moulded plinth, string courses, angle buttresses, a south pointed window with a hood mould, clock faces, three-light bell openings with hood moulds and crocketed ogee gablets, and an embattled parapet with eight crocketed pinnacles. The south doorway dates from the early 13th century and has three orders, with colonnettes and mouldings, and the clerestory windows are round-headed and date from the 12th century.	I
St Mary's Church, Little Driffield; 54.00638°N 0.46062°W		12th century	The nave and chancel were largely rebuilt in 1889–90 by Temple Moore, incorporating some earlier material. The church consists of a nave with a north porch, a chancel and a west tower. The tower has two stages, a chamfered plinth, diagonal buttresses, a chamfered string course, a two-light west window, two-light bell openings, a corbel table with masks, a parapet, and a pyramidal roof with a weathercock. The blocked south doorway dates from about 1200, and has colonnettes and a pointed arch.	II*
Leason House; 54.00736°N 0.44241°W	—	1711	The house is in brick, and has a pantile roof with raised tumbled gables. There are two storeys and an attic, and one bay. The doorway has a moulded surround and a three-light fanlight, and above is a bow window.	II
Bridge House; 54.00815°N 0.43927°W		Early 18th century	The house, which has been remodelled and extended, is in rendered brick on a chamfered plinth, with stone dressings, rusticated quoins, a sill band, a dentilled eaves cornice, and a pantile roof with a coped gable on the left, and oversailing eaves on the right. There are two storeys and attics, three bays, and a recessed bay to the right. The doorway has attached fluted columns, a rectangular fanlight in panelled reveals, and a dentilled pediment. It is flanked by canted bay windows, the upper floor windows are in architraves, and there are two gabled dormers.	II
22 Middle Street North; 54.00748°N 0.44104°W	—	18th century	The house is in whitewashed brick, with stone dressings, and a pantile roof with tumbled-in brick to the gables. There are two storeys and three bays. The central doorway has fluted pilasters with rosettes, a rectangular fanlight and a hood. The windows are sashes with channelled wedge lintels.	II
Pritchett House; 54.00744°N 0.44243°W	—	1751	The house, which has been used for various purposes in the past, is in red brick, and has a pantile roof with raised and tumbled gables. There are two storeys and three bays, The central doorway has pilasters, a semicircular fanlight, panelled reveals, and an open pediment. It is flanked by tripartite casement windows and above it is a sash window flanked by bow windows.	II
Canal lock, Driffield Navigation; 53.99796°N 0.42873°W		c. 1768	The lock is in red brick with gritstone dressings, The chamber has parallel sides, narrowing towards the gates.	II
58 Middle Street North; 54.00802°N 0.44178°W	—	Late 18th century	The house is in brick with a pantile roof. There are two storeys and three bays, and a lower extension to the right. The doorway has attached fluted columns, a semicircular fanlight in panelled reveals, and a projecting moulded cornice. The windows are sashes under cambered brick arches.	II
24 Saint John's Road; 54.00328°N 0.44044°W	—	Late 18th century	The house is in brick, with stone dressings and a pantile roof. There are two storeys, three bays, a cross-wing and a rear wing. The doorway has fluted pilasters with roundels, a blocked fanlight and an open dentilled pediment. To its left is a giant sash window, to the right is a canted bay window, and the upper floor contains sash windows; all the sash windows have channelled cambered wedge lintels.	II
Cobblestones; 54.00159°N 0.43230°W		Late 18th century	The house is in brick, with stone dressings, and a pantile roof with tumbled-in brick to the plain close verges. There are two storeys and three bays. The central doorway has moulded pilasters, a semicircular fanlight with radial glazing in panelled reveals, and a low pediment. The windows are sashes under flat gauged brick arches.	II
Riverhead Court; 54.00137°N 0.43279°W		Late 18th century	The warehouse, which has been converted into flats, is in brick with a bracketed timber eaves cornice, and a pantile roof with raised coped gables. There are three storeys and a basement, a rectangular plan, and 13 bays. The ground floor contains doorways, on the middle floor are loading doors, and all the floors contain pivoted sash windows; all the openings have segmental heads. On the second bay is a gabled timber framed weatherboarded gantry approached by timber stairs.	II
2–4 River Head; 54.00157°N 0.43341°W		Late 18th to early 19th century	A terrace of three brick houses, with stone dressings, a stepped eaves cornice, bracketed eaves, and a pantile roof. There are two storeys and attics, and six bays. Each house has a round-headed doorway with pilasters, a blocked fanlight in panelled reveals, and a dentilled pediment, and there is a small service door. The windows are sashes with wedge lintels, and there are two gabled roof dormers.	II
27 River Head; 54.00127°N 0.43331°W		Late 18th to early 19th century	The house is in brick, with stone dressings and a pantile roof. There are two storeys and attics, and three bays. The central doorway has a rectangular fanlight under a flat gauged brick arch. The windows are sashes with wedge lintels, and there are two gabled roof dormers.	II
Mortimer's Warehouse; 54.00102°N 0.43247°W		Late 18th to early 19th century	The warehouse is in brick, with paired eaves brackets and a pantile roof. There are three storeys, a rectangular plan, and six bays. On the front is a carriage entrance with a segmental head, and the other openings have square pivoted boarded shutters under segmental arches. Between the upper two floors is a painted panel with the name of the warehouse.	II
Beechwood and The Beeches; 54.00139°N 0.42858°W	—	c. 1813	The house was considerably enlarged to the south and east by Temple Moore in about 1880., and later divided into two. It is in brick, with roofs in tile and slate. The original range has two storeys and an east front of three bays. The central doorway has a rusticated surround and a large fanlight, it is flanked by canted bay windows, and on the upper floor are sash windows. To the left is a single-bay extension with an ornate front. The later part is larger, and has two storeys and attics. The northwest front contains five tall mullioned and transomed windows, above which are three canted oriel windows, over which are three canted gabled dormers. On the southwest front is a central projecting porch with a canted bay window above.	II
Easterfield House and walls 54.00742°N 0.43517°W		c. 1820	The house is in brown brick, with stone dressings, sill bands, and a hipped pantile roof. There are two storeys and three bays. In the centre is a Roman Doric porch with detached columns, and a fanlight with radial glazing in a panelled soffit and reveals. The windows are sashes under channelled wedge lintels with raised keystones. The wing walls are ramped with stone copings, and end in square pillars with moulded caps. There is a round-headed niche in the centre of each wall, and a sill band.	II
The Butcher's Dog and 56 Market Place; 54.00513°N 0.43891°W		c. 1820	A public house and a shop in red and light brown brick on a stone plinth, with sill bands and a pantile roof. There are three storeys and three bays. In the centre is a round-headed carriage arch with a keystone. The left bay has a shopfront above which is a two-storey canted bay window, and on the right bay is a three-storey canted bay window. Above the carriage arch are sash windows under channelled wedge lintels.	II
18–21 Bridge Street; 54.00804°N 0.43971°W	—	Early 19th century	A terrace of four houses in brick, with a stepped brick eaves cornice, and a pantile roof with tumbled-in brick on the right gable. There are two storeys and eleven bays. The right doorway has pilasters, fluted reveals, a semicircular fanlight with radial glazing, and a segmental pediment. The other doorways have plain surrounds, divided rectangular fanlights, and flat gauged brick arches, and there is a smaller service door. The windows are sashes in architraves, with flat gauged brick arches.	II
23 Exchange Street; 54.00561°N 0.43907°W	—	Early 19th century	The house is in brick on a plinth, with stone dressings, a timber eaves cornice and a pantile roof. There are two storeys and four bays. The main doorway has fluted pilasters, a semicircular fanlight with curved radial glazing in panelled reveals, and a dentilled pediment, and to the right is a smaller doorway. The windows are sashes with wedge lintels.	II
6 New Road; 54.00700°N 0.43612°W	—	Early 19th century	The house is in painted brick, with stone dressings, a timber eaves cornice, bracketed eaves and a pantile roof. There are two storeys and three bays. The central doorway has fluted pilasters, a fanlight in panelled reveals, a frieze, and a dentilled pediment. The windows are sashes with wedge lintels; the window above the doorway is blocked.	II
31 and 32 New Road; 54.00776°N 0.43527°W	—	Early 19th century	A pair of houses in brick, with stone dressings, a timber eaves cornice and a hipped slate roof. There are three storeys and two bays. The doorways on the outer parts have Doric pilasters, panelled soffits and reveals, and triglyph friezes. The windows are sashes under flat brick gauged arches.	II
Bell Hotel; 54.00568°N 0.43982°W		Early 19th century	The hotel is in rendered and colourwashed brick with stone dressings, sill bands, a moulded eaves cornice and a slate roof. There are two storeys and four bays. The third bay is recessed, and contains a Doric porch with twin detached columns and flanking pilasters. The windows are sashes with architraves. Above the porch is a decorative wrought iron screen incorporating a bunch of grapes and vine leaves, and a suspended bell.	II
Buck Inn and 2 Market Place; 54.00464°N 0.43863°W		Early 19th century	The public house and shop are roughcast, with stone dressings, a moulded floor band with a Greek key motif, and a slate roof. There are three storeys and six bays, the left four bays forming the public house. In the middle of this is a doorway, it is flanked by bow windows, to the right is a shopfront, and the upper floors contain sash windows in architraves.	II
Burnside; 54.00715°N 0.44074°W		Early 19th century	The house is in brick, with stone dressings, a floor band, a timber eaves cornice, and a hipped slate roof. There are two storeys and three bays, and flanking single-storey single-bay wings with coped parapets. In the centre is a Roman Doric porch with detached columns, a fanlight, a frieze, and a moulded cornice. The windows are sashes with wedge lintels and projecting moulded keystones.	II
Tiger Inn; 54.00473°N 0.43828°W		Early 19th century	The public house is in whitewashed brick, with stone dressings and a slate roof. There are three storeys and three bays. On the left is a doorway with flute pilasters and a rectangular fanlight. To its right is a shopfront, and further to the right is a segmental-arched carriage entrance. Above, the middle bay contains blocked openings, the outer bays have sash windows, and all have cambered wedge lintels.	II
Sunnycroft; 54.00864°N 0.43431°W	—	1826	The house is in white brick, with stuccoed dressings, a patterned floor band, an eaves cornice, and a hipped slate roof. There are two storeys, and three bays flanked by pilasters. In the centre is an Ionic porch, and a doorway with a radial fanlight in panelled reveals. The windows are sashes with wedge lintels.	II
Linderhof; 54.00165°N 0.43217°W		c. 1830	The house is in brick on a chamfered plinth, with stone dressings and a pantile roof. There are two storeys and three bays. The central doorway has pilasters, a rectangular fanlight in a panelled soffit and reveals, and a shallow moulded cornice. The windows are sashes under flat gauged brick arches.	II
Rose Garth; 53.99991°N 0.44060°W	—	c. 1830	The house is in brick, with a timber eaves cornice on paired brackets, and a hipped slate roof. There are two storeys and two bays. In the centre is a Doric porch with pilasters and a moulded cornice, and a doorway with a rectangular fanlight in panelled reveals. To its right is a canted bay window, and the other windows are sashes under channelled wedge lintels.	II
62 Middle Street North; 54.00859°N 0.44234°W	—	1838	The house is in brick, with stone dressings, a floor band, and a hipped slate roof. There are two storeys and five bays. In the centre is a porch with Tuscan columns and pilasters, and an entablature, and a doorway containing a semicircular fanlight with radial glazing in panelled reveals. The windows are sashes in cambered wedge lintels.	II
Crane east of 5 River Head; 54.00158°N 0.43272°W		19th century	The hand-operated swivel crane has wrought iron stays, a timber jib, and a cast iron frame and machinery.	II
Crane southeast of Mortimer's Warehouse; 54.00003°N 0.43133°W		19th century	The hand-operated swivel crane has wrought iron stays, a timber jib, and a cast iron frame and machinery.	II
Pinfold; 54.01112°N 0.43974°W	—	Mid-19th century	The pinfold is in brick. It has a circular plan, with a diameter of about 13 metres (43 ft), and there is an entrance on the southwest.	II
Riverhead Mill; 54.00121°N 0.43200°W		Mid-19th century	The warehouse, later converted for residential use, is in brown brick with a pantile roof. There are four storeys and nine bays. It contains various openings with segmental heads, and there is a weatherboarded gantry with a gabled roof. Between the upper two floors is a painted panel with the name of the mill.	II
Headmaster's House; 54.00509°N 0.44170°W	—	1854	The house, designed by Cuthbert Brodrick, is in brick on a chamfered plinth, with a moulded string course, a moulded eaves cornice with grotesques, and a slate roof with raised coped gables, and ridge cresting. There are two storeys and a front of two bays. The left bay has a projecting two-storey porch containing a doorway with a pointed chamfered surround, above which is a lancet window, and a parapet with a quatrefoil. On the right bay is a three-light window with a chamfered pointed arch on each floor, over which is a gablet with a cinquefoil.	II
51 Market Place; 54.00537°N 0.43934°W	—	1856	A shop, at one time a bank, designed by Cuthbert Brodrick, it is in stone and brick on a stepped plinth, with a moulded string course ending in foliated finials, a full entablature to the eaves, a shallow moulded architrave, a frieze with rosettes, a dentilled cornice with rosettes to the cymatium, and a hipped slate roof. There are two storeys and three bays. The doorway on the right bay has a round-arched head, transverse fluting to the reveals, moulded capitals, and transverse fluting and a roundel to the soffit. The other ground floor bays contain similar windows, and the bays are demarcated by pilasters with transverse fluting. On the upper floor are round-arched sash windows with moulded surrounds.	II
High Field Country Club; 54.01125°N 0.44051°W	—	1865	The large house that was altered and extended from the 1880s to designs by Temple Moore, and later used for other purposes. It is in white brick on the ground floor and applied timber framing above, with tile roofs, two storeys and attics. The north entrance front has eight bays and five gables. The porch has two storeys, a segmental arch and a fanlight, and above it is a jettied square bay window. The windows are casements, and on the wings are square bay windows, oriel windows and dormers.	II
Masonic Hall; 54.00201°N 0.43836°W		1878	Originally a museum, the hall is in brick on a chamfered plinth, with dressings in orange brick and stone, pilasters between the bays, dentilled eaves and a Welsh slate roof. The gable end faces the street, and in the centre is a projecting porch with black marble columns and foliate capitals, an opening with a triangular head and a circular ornament in red marble, and above are ornate iron balcony railings. The windows are sashes with incised strapwork decoration, and circular red marble ornaments. The upper floor windows have triangular heads, those in the centre paired and separated by a black marble column. In the gable, which has ornate bargeboards, is a diamond-shaped plaque with a datestone.	II
Our Lady and St Edward's Church; 54.00685°N 0.44301°W		1886	The church is in red brick, with yellow terracotta dressings and a tile roof, and is in Romanesque style. It consists of a nave with a north porch and vestry, and a chancel with a north chapel and an apse. At the west end is a gabled bellcote. The entrance in the porch is round-arched, with three orders containing dogtooth, chevron and nail head decoration.	II
