= Mortimer's Warehouse =

Warehouse in Driffield, East Riding of Yorkshire, England

Coordinates: 54°00′04″N 0°25′57″W

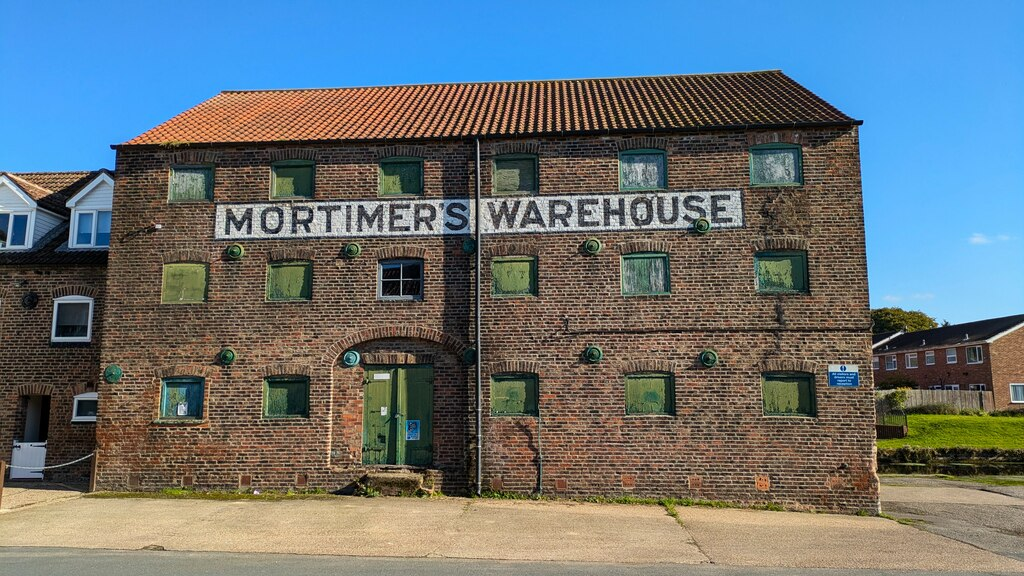
The building, in 2024

Mortimer's Warehouse is a historic building in Driffield, a town in the East Riding of Yorkshire, in England.

The Driffield Navigation was completed in 1770, connecting the town with the River Hull. A group of warehouses were constructed at the head of the canal over the next few decades, including a warehouse. In 1869, John Robert Mortimer founded a grain and seed merchant, which later became known as James Mortimer. From the 1870s, it used the warehouse as a granary. After a few years, it purchased the building, which became known as "Mortimer's Warehouse". The company sold the building in 2016. In 2022, plans were submitted for its conversion into a shop, offices, and public meeting space. The building has been grade II listed since 1985.

The warehouse is built of brick, with paired eaves brackets and a pantile roof. It has three storeys, a rectangular plan, and is six bays wide. On the front is a carriage entrance with a segmental head, and the other openings have square pivoted boarded shutters under segmental arches. Between the upper two floors is a painted panel with the name of the warehouse.

== See also ==
- Listed buildings in Driffield
