= Alfred Bean Hospital =

Hospital in the East Riding of Yorkshire, England

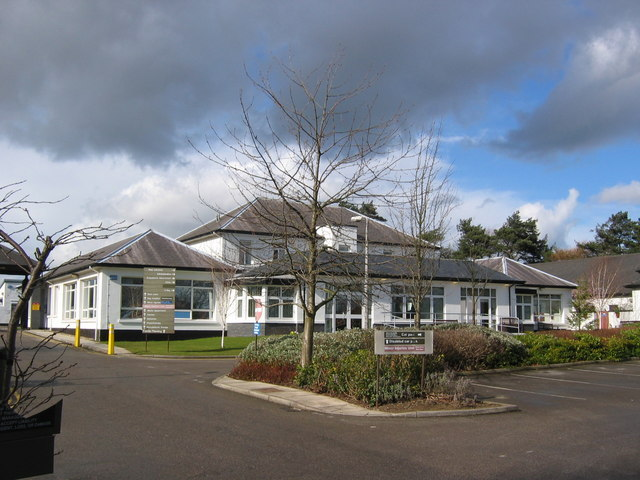
- Alfred Bean Hospital

- Shown in the East Riding of Yorkshire

Geography
- Location: Bridlington Road, Driffield, East Riding of Yorkshire, England
- Coordinates: 54.0122°N 0.4232°W

Organisation
- Care system: NHS

Services
- Emergency department: No

History
- Founded: 1873

Links
- Lists: Hospitals in England

Alfred Bean Hospital is a health facility in Bridlington Road, Driffield, East Riding of Yorkshire, England.

== History ==
The facility has its origins in the Driffield Cottage Hospital on Bridlington Road which was completed in 1873. When the cottage hospital became rather decrepit, a new facility, entirely funded by Alfred Bean, a local businessman, was commissioned. It was built further east along the Bridlington Road and was completed in 1931. It joined the National Health Service in 1948 and, after the East Riding General Hospital closed in 1990, the Alfred Bean Hospital became the main hospital in the area.
