= Driffield Show =

Coordinates: 53.9953°N 0.4504°W

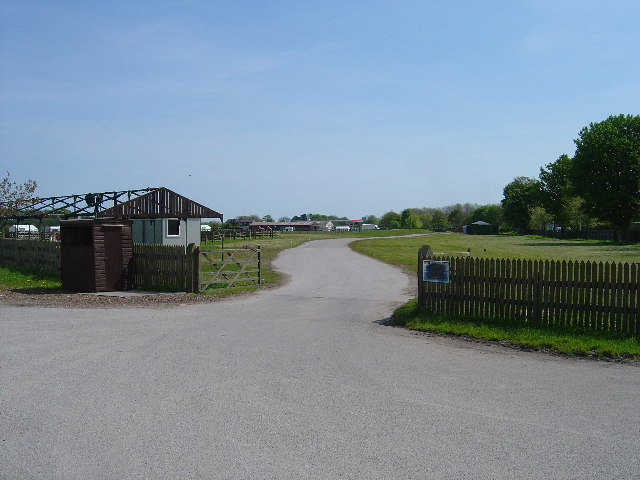
Entrance to the showground

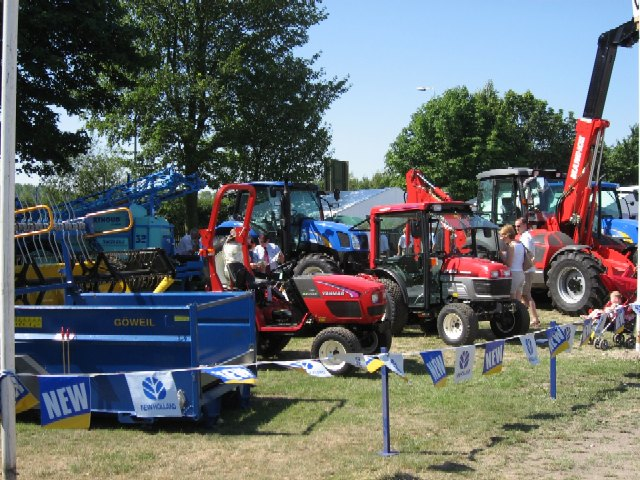
Farm machinery on Driffield Show in 2006

Driffield Show is a one-day agricultural show held in mid-July in the town of Driffield. The showground is located southwest of the town near Kelleythorpe, and hosts other events throughout the year such as a steam and vintage rally.

As of 2017, the show is in its 142nd year and is the largest one-day agricultural show in Yorkshire.
