= St Mary's Church, Little Driffield =

Church in the East Riding of Yorkshire, England

Coordinates: 54°00′23″N 0°27′38″W

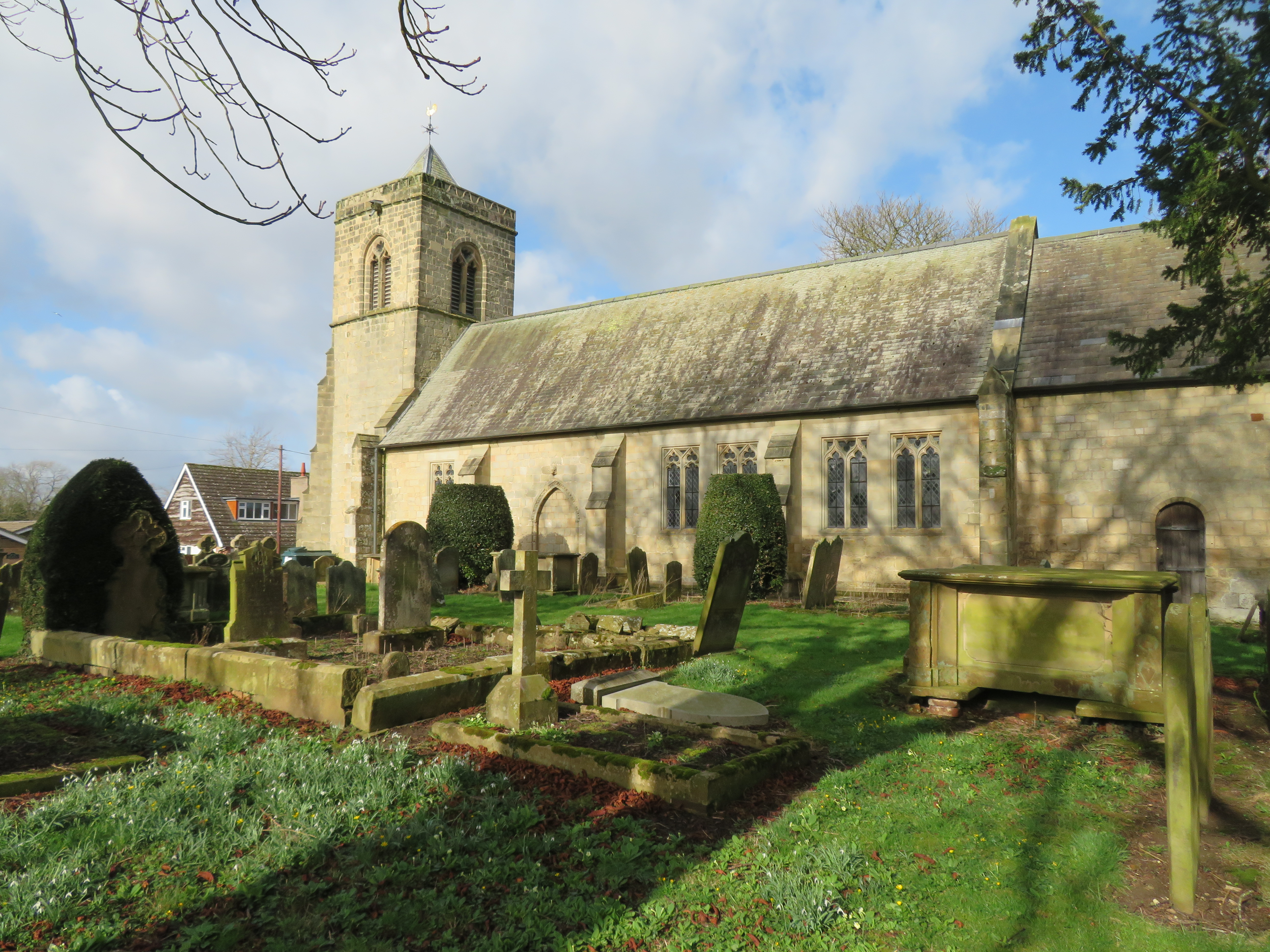
The church, in 2024

St Mary's Church is an Anglican church in Little Driffield, a village in the East Riding of Yorkshire, in England.

The church was built in the 12th century, and the tower was heightened in the 15th century. The church was heavily restored in the early 19th century, then largely rebuilt by Temple Moore between 1889 and 1890. The building was grade II* listed in 1985. Inside the church, a plaque claims it is the burial place of Alhred of Northumbria.

The church consists of a nave with a north porch, a chancel and a west tower. The tower has two stages, a chamfered plinth, diagonal buttresses, a chamfered string course, a two-light west window, two-light bell openings, a corbel table with masks, a parapet, and a pyramidal roof with a weathercock. The blocked south doorway dates from about 1200, and has colonnettes and a pointed arch. Inside, the chancel arch is 12th century in perhaps earlier stonework and incorporates carved human faces. There is a nine-sided font and an early-18th century pulpit.

== See also ==
- Grade II* listed buildings in the East Riding of Yorkshire
- Listed buildings in Driffield
