= Driffield Times =

Defunct newspaper from Yorkshire, England

- Type: Weekly
- Format: Tabloid since 1988
- Owner(s): Johnston Press
- Editor: Hellen Gardner
- Associate editor: Jill Pick
- Founded: 1869
- Language: English
- Ceased publication: 2016
- Circulation: 4,915 (2012)
- Website: www.driffieldtoday.co.uk/ (Archive Copy)

The Driffield Times & Post was a weekly newspaper in Driffield, East Riding of Yorkshire, England. It was owned by Yorkshire Regional Newspapers Ltd a subsidy of the Johnston Press publishing empire.

== History ==
The Driffield Times paper was founded in 1869 originally it was in a broadsheet format but in 1988 switched to the tabloid format. In September 2011, the Times merged with another local newspaper, the Driffield Post. It was announced on 10 August 2016 that the Driffield Times and Post along with the Beverley Guardian would cease publication. The last issue of the Driffield Times and Post went on sale on Thursday 15 September 2016 bringing to an end almost 150 years of publication.
