= Driffield Town Hall =

Commercial building in Driffield, East Riding of Yorkshire, England

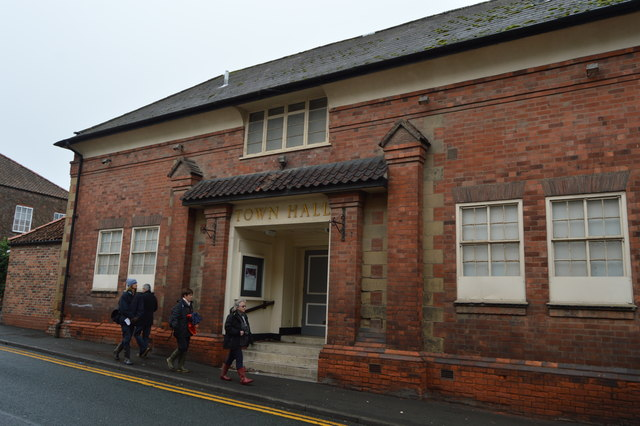
- Driffield Town Hall

- Shown in the East Riding of Yorkshire
- 54.0060°N 0.4388°W
- Location: Exchange Street, Driffield

History
- Built: 1841

Site notes
- Architect: Henry Francis Lockwood
- Architectural style: Neoclassical style

Driffield Town Hall is a former municipal building in Exchange Street, Driffield, East Riding of Yorkshire, England. The structure is now used as an annex to a local hotel.

== History ==
In the early 18th century, the local corn traders and farmers still conducted their trade in the open air at the rear of the Bell Hotel. In the late 1830s, after finding this arrangement unsatisfactory, a group of local businessmen decided to form a company to finance and commission a purpose-built corn exchange for the town. The site chosen was on the northwest side of New Street, which was subsequently renamed Exchange Street.

The building was designed by Henry Francis Lockwood in the neoclassical style, built in ashlar stone at a cost of £2,000, and was completed on 1841. The design involved a symmetrical main frontage facing onto Exchange Street. Internally, the principal rooms were they main trading hall and a room to read newspapers. However, many of the corn merchants and farmers continued to conduct their trade at the rear of The Bell Hotel causing the company which had developed the corn exchange to get into financial difficulties. Also, the use of the building as a corn exchange declined significantly in the wake of the Great Depression of British Agriculture in the late 19th century.

Following significant population growth, largely associated with the growing importance of Driffield as a market town, the area became an urban district in 1894. The old corn exchange was conveniently sited on the opposite side of the street to the newly established council offices at 18 Exchange Street. The old corn exchange was therefore re-purposed as a town hall and used for public meetings. It also became the venue for the announcement of general election results for the Buckrose constituency; it was there that the Unionist candidate, Admiral Sir Guy Gaunt, was declared the local member of parliament in November 1922.

The neoclassical facade of the building was demolished and replaced by a red brick frontage in the mid-1930s. The new design involved a symmetrical main frontage of five bays facing onto Exchange Street. The central bay featured an opening flanked by two short pilasters supporting a canopy and two taller pilasters surmounted by small pediments. There was a central casement window protruding into the eaves and there were sash windows in the outer bays. The building was officially re-opened on 8 May 1937.

The building also served as a concert venue; the drummer, Mick Woodmansey, performer there with the rock band, The Mutations, in the mid-1960s. Following local government reorganisation in 1974, the offices at Exchange Street ceased to be the local seat of government and the town hall ceased to be used for public meetings. It was acquired by The Bell Hotel in 1986 and was subsequently used as an annex for large functions.

== See also ==
- Corn exchanges in England
