= Towthorpe, East Riding of Yorkshire =

Hamlet in the East Riding of Yorkshire, England

Coordinates: 54.054187°N 0.624789°W

Towthorpe
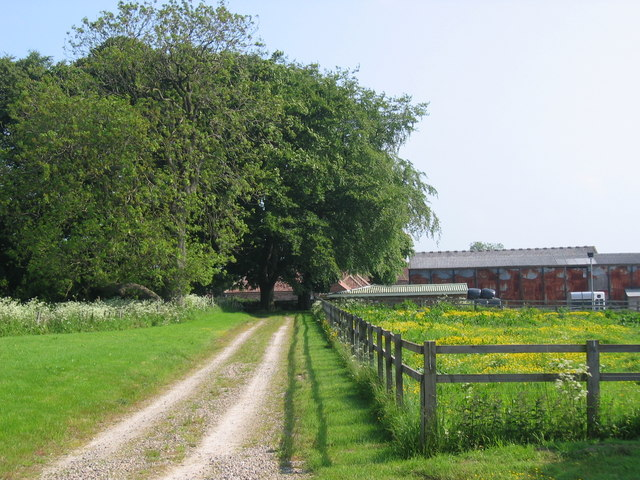

- Location within the East Riding of Yorkshire
- OS grid reference: SE901629
- Civil parish: Fimber
- Unitary authority: East Riding of Yorkshire
- Ceremonial county: East Riding of Yorkshire
- Region: Yorkshire and the Humber
- Country: England
- Sovereign state: United Kingdom
- Post town: DRIFFIELD
- Postcode district: YO25
- Dialling code: 01377
- Police: Humberside
- Fire: Humberside
- Ambulance: Yorkshire
- UK Parliament: Bridlington and The Wolds

Towthorpe is a hamlet and former civil parish, now in the parish of Fimber, in the East Riding of Yorkshire, England. It is situated in the Yorkshire Wolds just north of the B1248 road, approximately 8 miles (13 km) north-west of Driffield and 2 miles (3 km) south-west of Sledmere. In 1931 the parish had a population of 66. The deserted medieval village is a scheduled monument. The name Towthorpe derives from the Old Norse Toveþorp or Tofiþorp, meaning 'Tove/Tofi's secondary settlement'.

== Governance ==
Towthorpe was formerly a township in the parish of Wharram Percy, in 1866 Towthorpe became a civil parish, on 1 April 1935 the parish was abolished and merged with Fimber.
