= Little Driffield =

Village in the East Riding of Yorkshire, England

Coordinates: 54°00′26″N 0°27′40″W

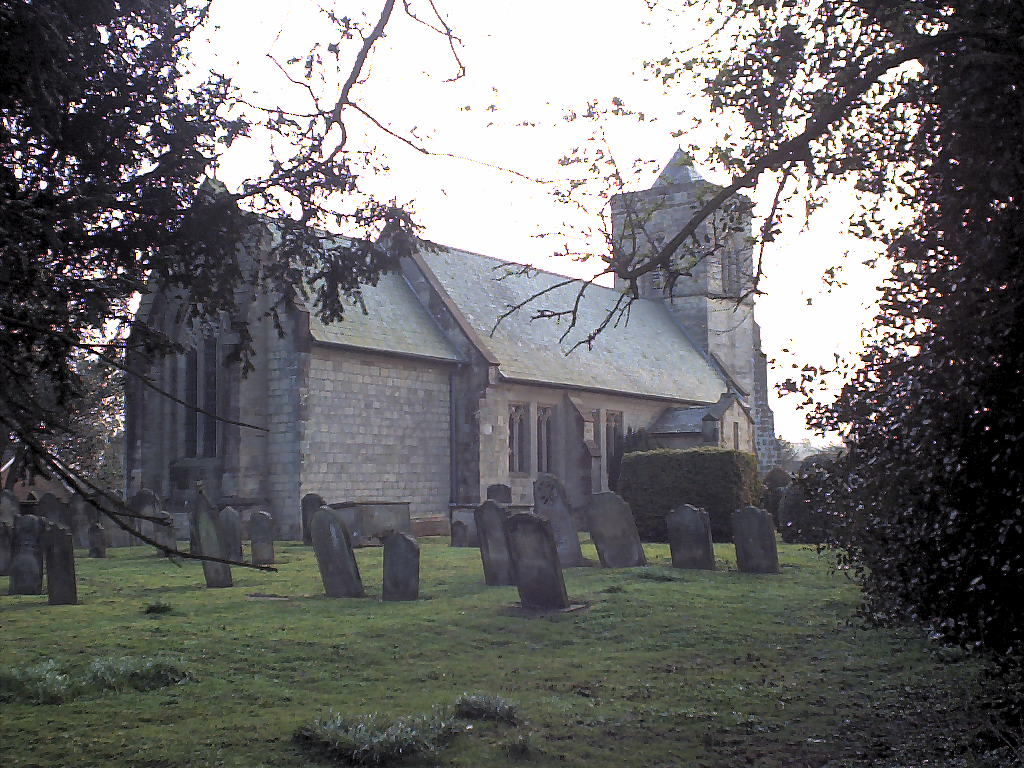
- St Mary's Church, Little Driffield

- Location within the East Riding of Yorkshire
- OS grid reference: TA009577
  - London: 170 mi (270 km) S
- Civil parish: Driffield
- Unitary authority: East Riding of Yorkshire
- Ceremonial county: East Riding of Yorkshire
- Region: Yorkshire and the Humber
- Country: England
- Sovereign state: United Kingdom
- Post town: DRIFFIELD
- Postcode district: YO25
- Dialling code: 01377
- Police: Humberside
- Fire: Humberside
- Ambulance: Yorkshire
- UK Parliament: Bridlington and The Wolds

Little Driffield is a small village in the civil parish of Driffield, in the East Riding of Yorkshire, England. It is situated on the western outskirts of Great Driffield, to the west of the A614 road and south of the A166 road.

== History ==
The name Driffield probably derives from the Old English drīffeld meaning 'stubbly field'. Another suggestion is that it derives from dritfeld meaning 'dirty field'.

The village once had a large pond and green. The pond was reduced to about half its size when Brendan Green was built in the 1960s. The majority of the green is now walled in and privately owned, belonging to one of the most prominent houses in the village – Springfield House, (now Church House) which lost its iron railings, together with those from the churchyard, to help the war effort. A chapel built in 1878 was demolished recently and replaced by a house. The village school was demolished about 40 years ago.

Horsefair Lane was for many years the home and factory of clothing manufacturers, Dewhirst's. The factory later became Arcadia Clothing which closed some years ago. The site is now occupied by an industrial unit and 6 new houses. The last horse fair was held in 1918.

The A166 previously ran through the village until the construction of the town bypass (part of the A614), about 1982. Through traffic runs to the nearby Kelleythorpe Industrial Estate about half a mile south.

Little Driffield was formerly a township and chapelry in the parish of Driffield, in 1866 Little Driffield became a civil parish, on 25 March 1885 the parish was abolished to form "Emswell with Little Driffield", part also went to Great Driffield. In 1881 the parish had a population of 218.

== Landmarks ==
The Church of St Mary was designated a Grade II* listed building in 1985 and is now recorded in the National Heritage List for England, maintained by Historic England. King Aldfrith of Northumbria (685 – 705) is supposedly buried in the church. However, no evidence of this was found when the nave and chancel were rebuilt and the floor excavated in 1807 (the 14th-century tower remained untouched). The church was restored in the 1890s by architect Temple Moor.

The village previously contained two public houses: The Rose & Crown and The Downe Arms, (named after the lady of the manor). The Downe Arms became a restaurant and is now a private house. The Rose and Crown remains in use.

Elmswell Beck runs through the southern edge of the village and joins with Little Driffield Beck (from the pond). These are tributaries of the River Hull.

== Housing ==
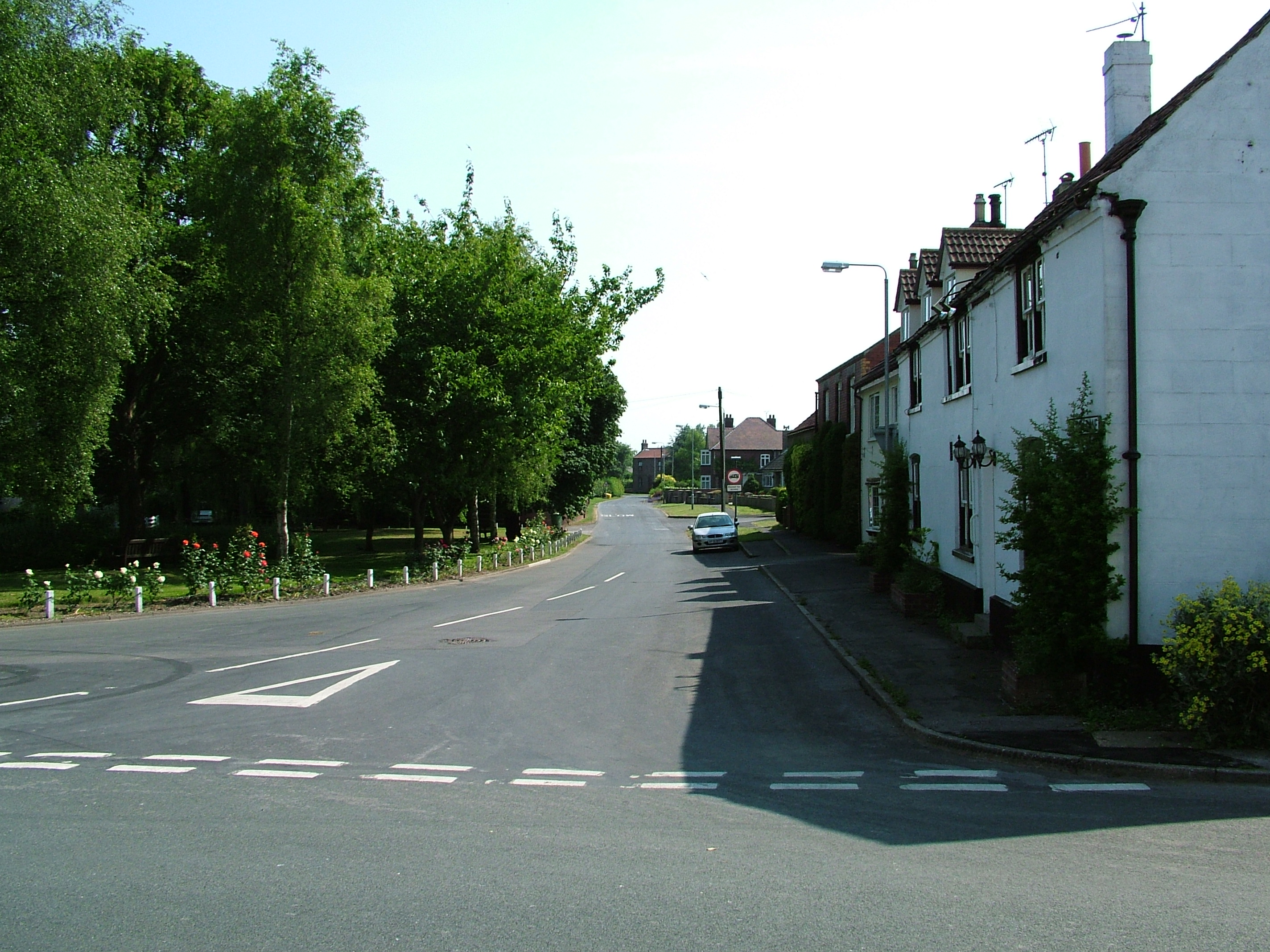
Church Lane

New housing has been built since the 1990s, particularly Londsborough Court, which was a milk tanker storage yard and before that an abattoir which adjoined Brendan Green, previously the site of a tannery. There were two tanneries in the village in the 19th and early 20th centuries. Another development from the 1990s comprises nine homes on Church Walk. Six new houses were built in 2006 on Horsefair Lane.
