= Driffield =

Town and civil parish in the East Riding of Yorkshire, England

Coordinates: 54°00′18″N 0°26′17″W

- Town and Civil Parish
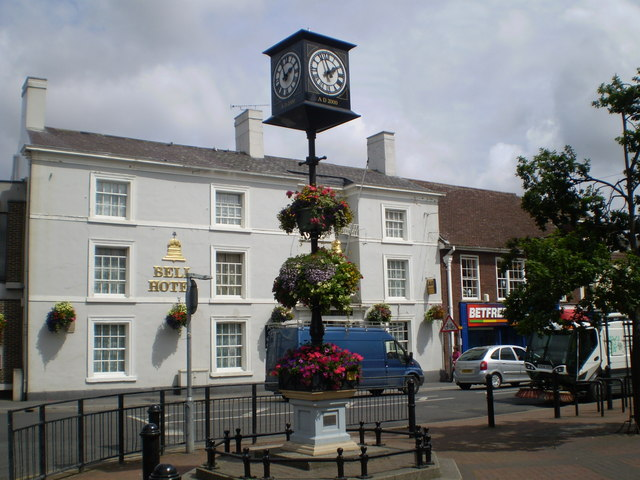
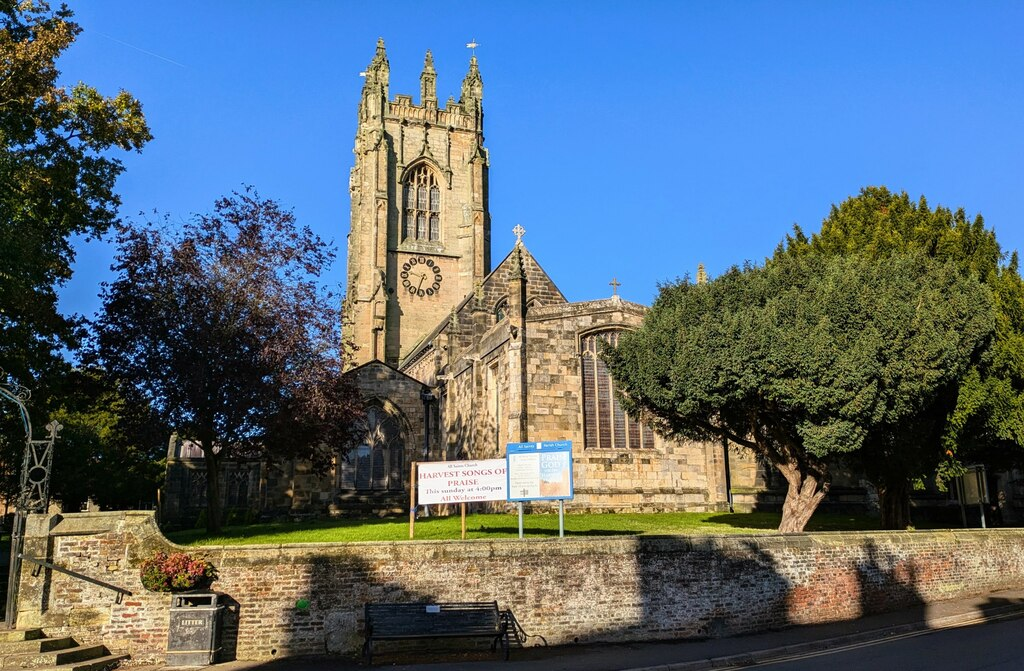
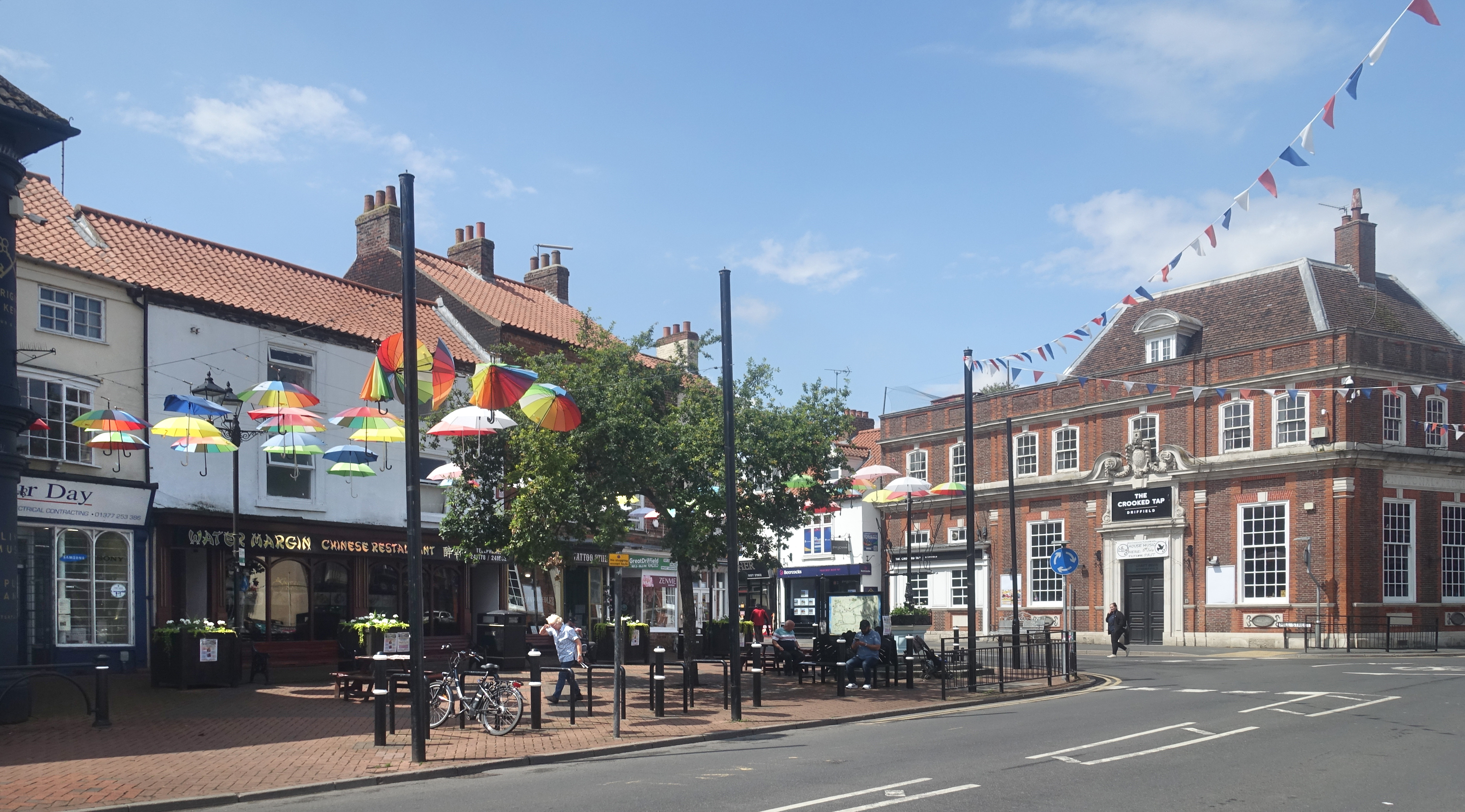
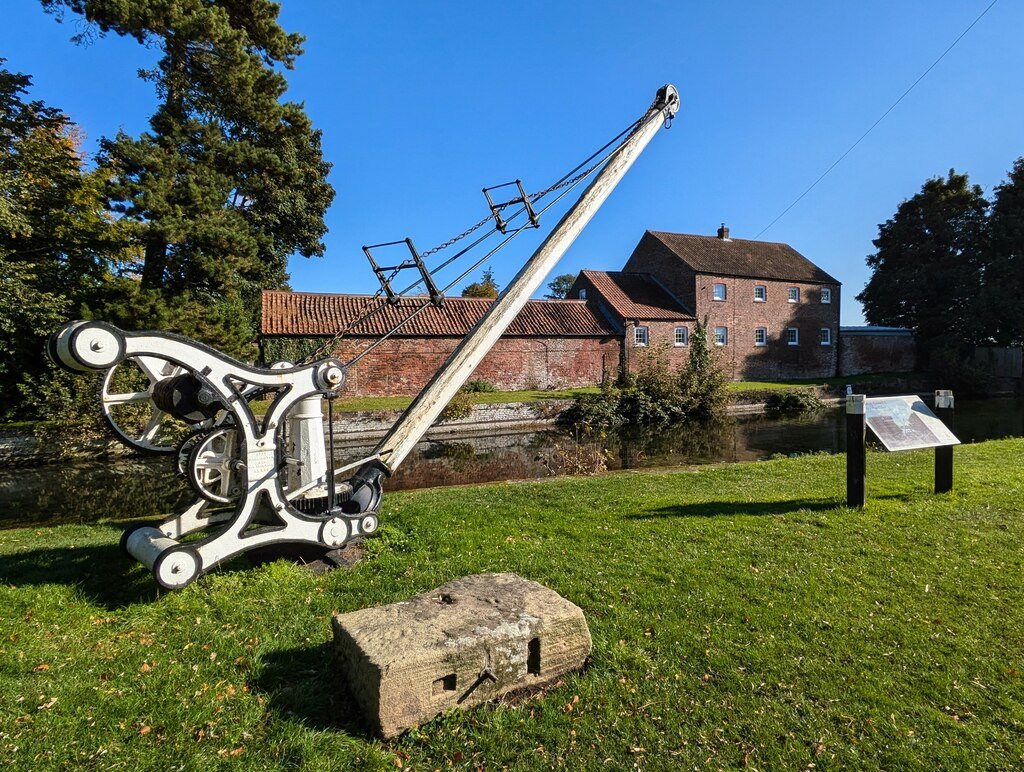
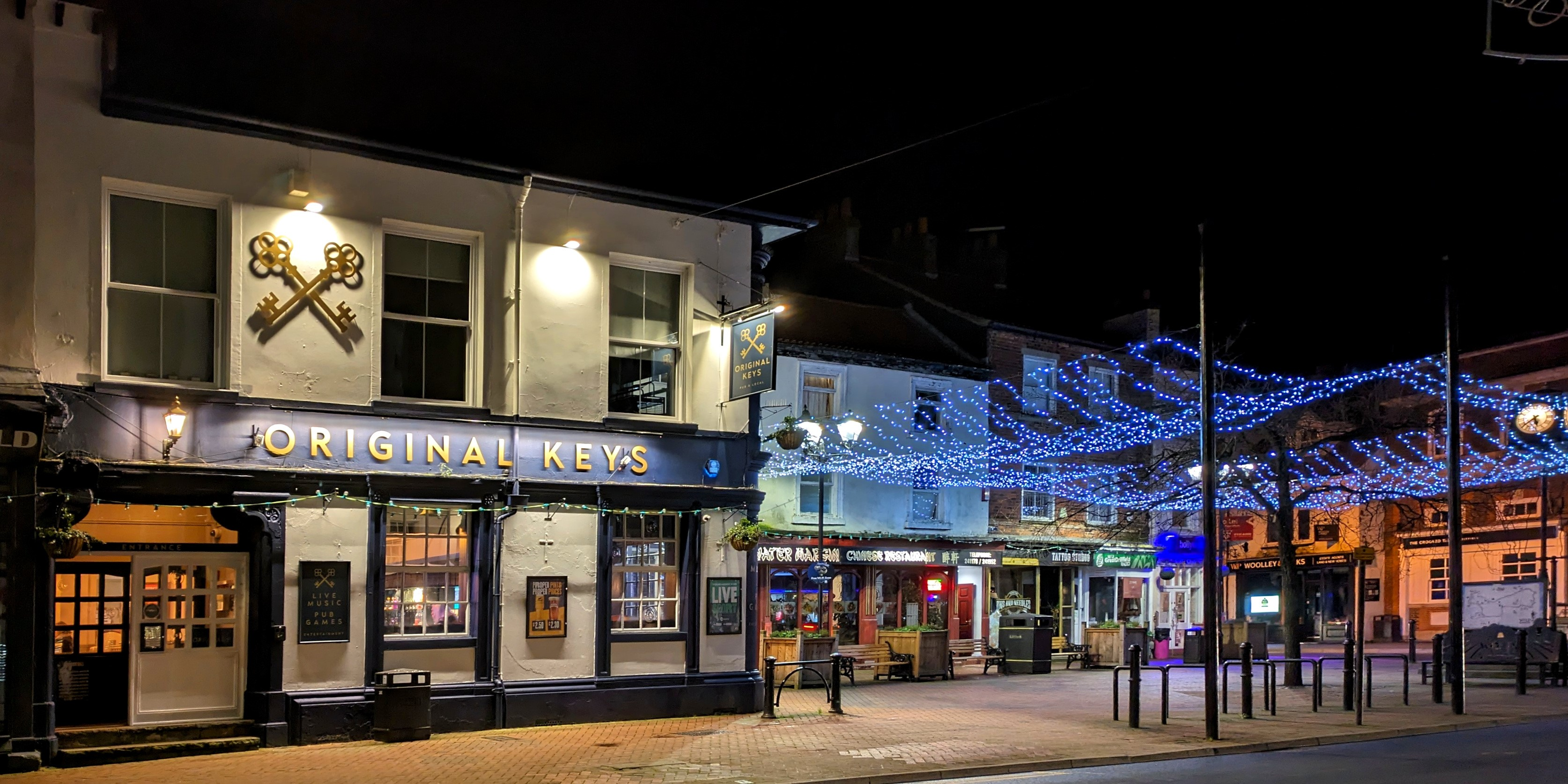
- Town Clock All Saints Church The Marketplace The Canal Original Keys

- Arms of Driffield Town Council

- Location within the East Riding of Yorkshire
- Population: 13,457 (2021 Census)
- OS grid reference: TA023577
  - London: 175 mi (282 km) S
- Civil parish: Driffield
- Unitary authority: East Riding of Yorkshire
- Ceremonial county: East Riding of Yorkshire
- Region: Yorkshire and the Humber
- Country: England
- Sovereign state: United Kingdom
- Post town: DRIFFIELD
- Postcode district: YO25
- Dialling code: 01377
- Police: Humberside
- Fire: Humberside
- Ambulance: Yorkshire
- UK Parliament: Bridlington and the Wolds

Driffield, also known as Great Driffield (neighbouring Little Driffield), is a market town and civil parish in the East Riding of Yorkshire, England. The civil parish is formed by the town of Driffield and the village of Little Driffield. By road, it is 53 miles (85 km) north-east of Leeds, 29 miles (47 km) east of York and 23 miles (37 km) north of Hull.

Driffield, being near the centre of the Yorkshire Wolds, is named The Capital of the Wolds.

At the 2021 census, Driffield parish had a population of 13,457, an slight increase on the 2011 UK census figure of 13,080.

The town was listed in the 2019 Sunday Times report on the Best Places to Live in northern England.

== History ==
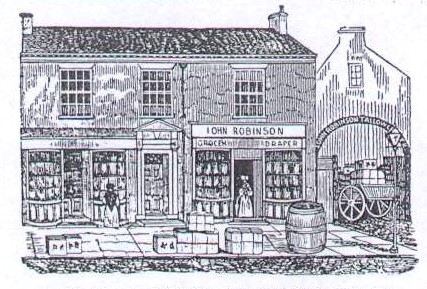
Driffield c. 1838

Driffield is of Anglo-Saxon origin, and the name is first attested in the Anglo-Saxon Chronicle where King Aldfrith of Northumbria died on 14 December 705. It is also found in the Domesday Book of 1086, meaning "dirty (manured) field".

A Bronze Age mound outside Driffield was excavated in the 19th century, the contents of which are now kept in the British Museum. It includes a knife, a dagger, a beaker and a greenstone wrist-guard all dating to between 2200 and 1500 BC.

The remains of Driffield Castle, a motte-and-bailey castle, sit at Moot Hill.

RAF Driffield was targeted by the Luftwaffe during the Second World War. On 15 August 1940, a raid by Junkers Ju 88s resulted in 14 deaths and many injuries. RAF Driffield was the site of the first death in the WAAF during the Second World War.

== Governance ==
The town is a major part of the Driffield and Rural electoral ward. This ward stretches north-west to Sledmere with a total population taken at the 2011 Census of 15,199. It is part of the Bridlington and the Wolds constituency for elections to Westminster. Driffield Town Hall is no longer used for public events and was acquired by The Bell Hotel in 1986.

On 1 April 1935 the parish of "Great Driffield" was abolished to form "Driffield", part also went to Nafferton. At the 1931 census (the last before the abolition of the parish), Great Driffield had a population of 5915.

== Economy ==
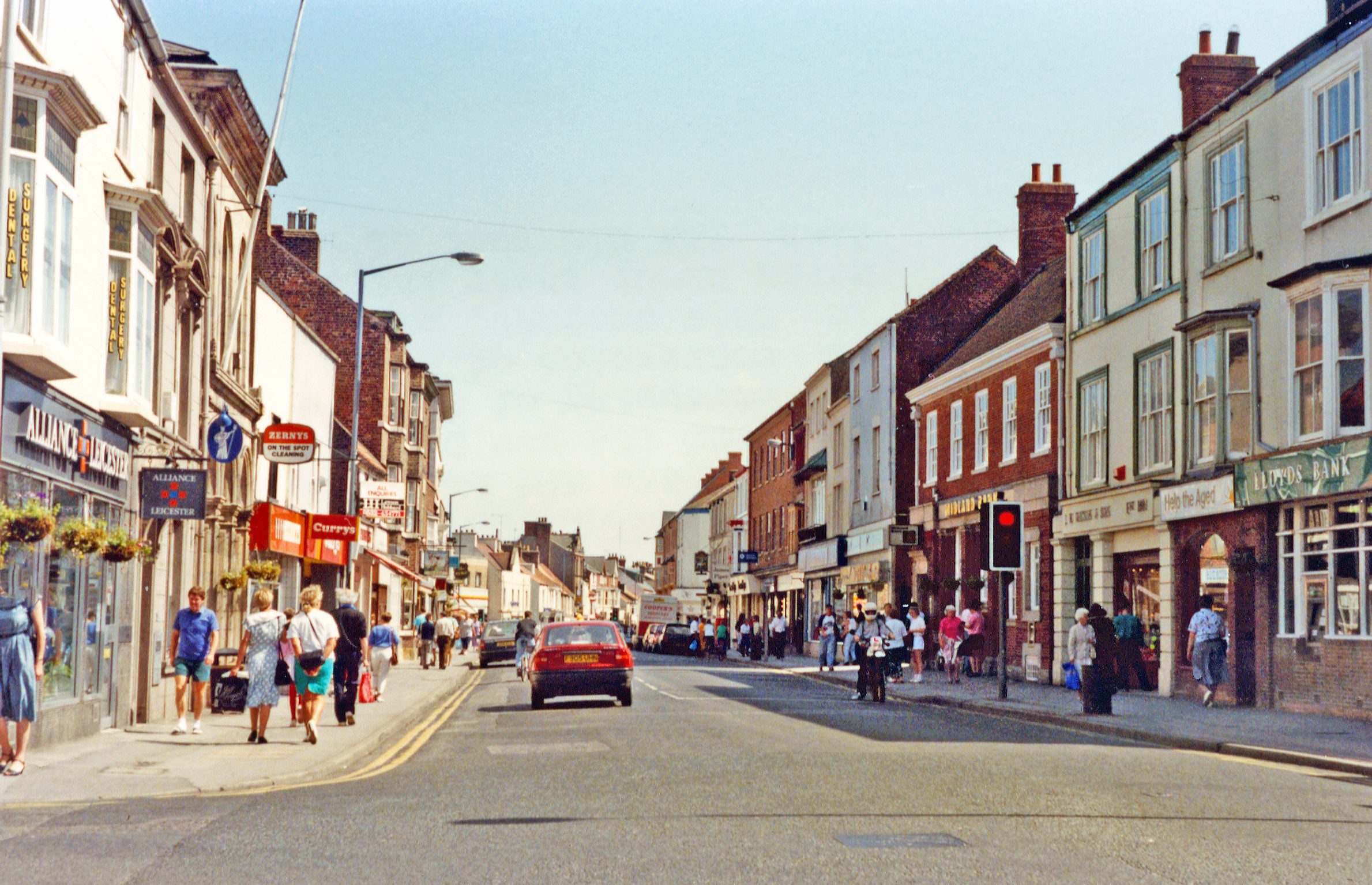
Driffield Middle Street 1992

Driffield is centred around Middle Street, its main high street, which hosts both independent retailers and chain stores. On a Thursday, a market is held in the town centre. The original cattle market is thought to have been established in the late 19th century and was located off Eastgate South. It closed in 2001.

== Culture and amenities ==
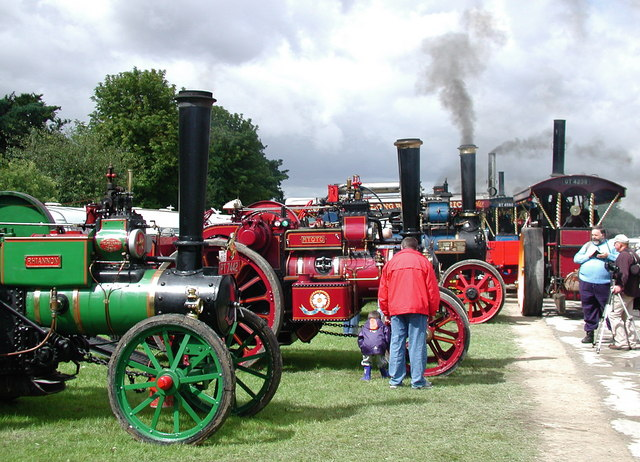
The Driffield Showground

The town is home to Driffield Show, the United Kingdom’s largest one-day annual agricultural show, as well as the Driffield Steam and Vintage Rally – an event held each August showcasing historical vehicles including traction engines, fairground organs, tractors and vintage cars and trucks. A particular focus is placed upon agricultural history, with demonstrations of ploughing and threshing often taking place. The rally is particularly known for the Saturday evening road-run of the steam engines and other vehicles into Driffield town centre, an event which invariably attracts large crowds of spectators.

Driffield also has a small community hospital (known as Alfred Bean Hospital), a fire station, a local police station, and several churches.

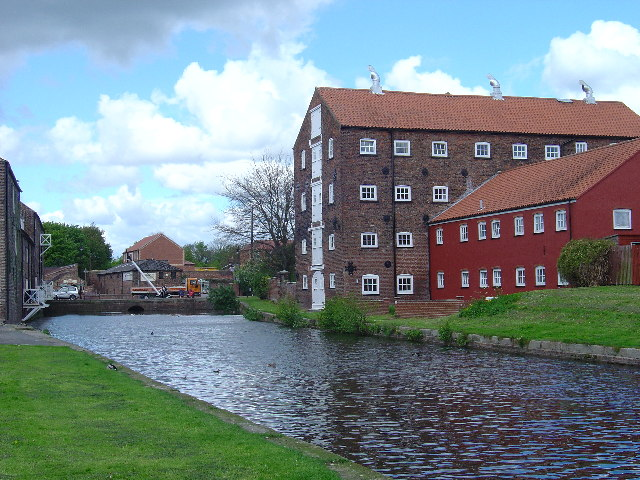
Driffield Canal

Driffield lies in the Yorkshire Wolds, on the Driffield Navigation canal, and near the source of the River Hull. This is maintained by the Driffield Navigation Trust and the group hosts an annual raft race and open day gala at the River Head.

The Driffield Beck runs roughly parallel to the main high street. Some stretches of Driffield Beck are popular for fishing, particularly for brown trout and grayling.

== Education ==
There are two infant schools (Driffield Northfield Infant School and Driffield Church Of England Voluntary Controlled Infant School), and one larger junior school (Driffield Junior School), which caters for children aged 7–11. Driffield School & Sixth Form is a large secondary school that also contains a sixth form, and so offers education up to A level standard. The town also includes Kings Mill Special School. The nearest independent school is Pocklington School.

== Transport ==
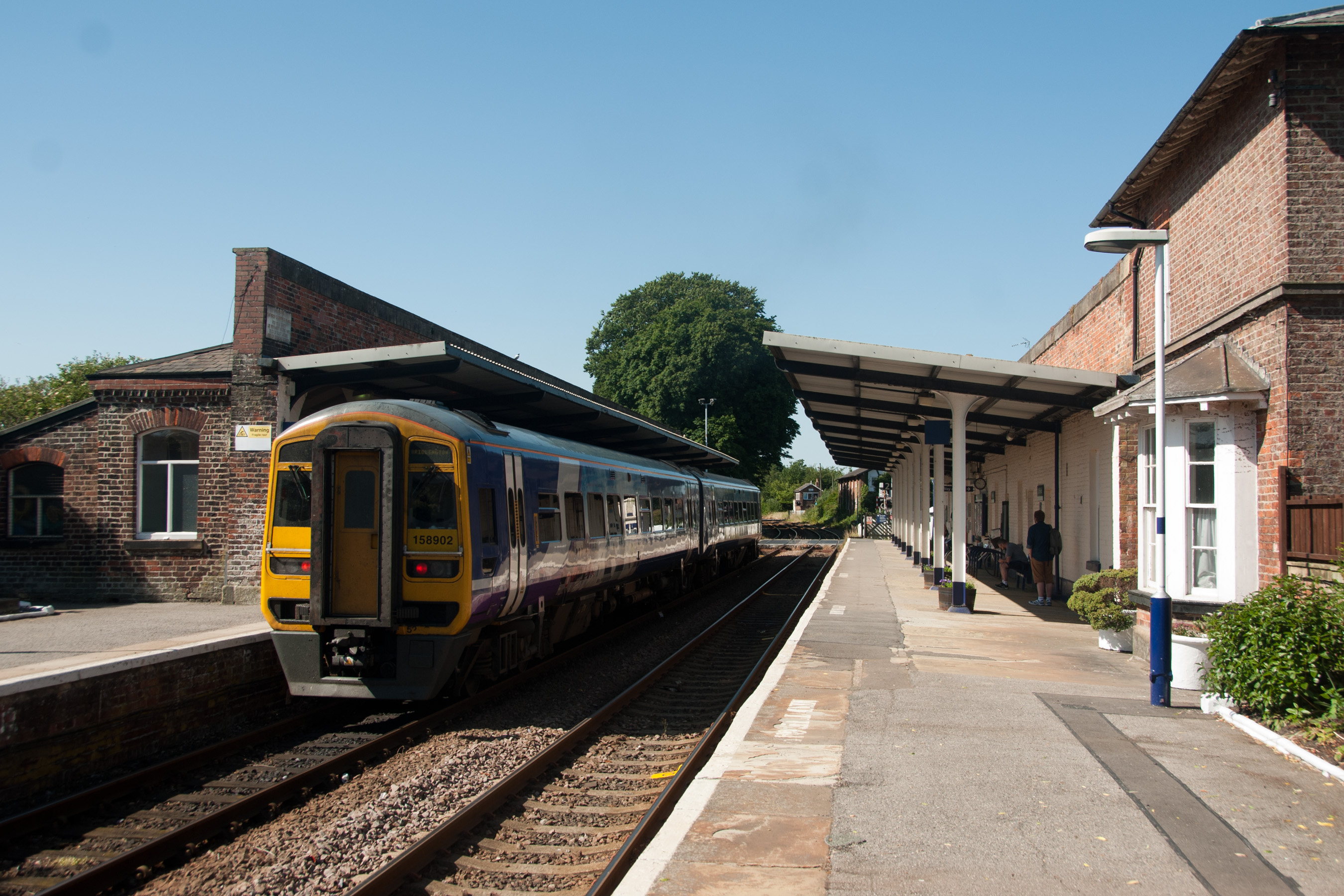
Driffield Railway Station

Driffield lies on the A614, A166 and B1249.

The town is served by Driffield railway station on the Yorkshire Coast Line, with services currently run by Northern and has direct trains to Sheffield, Doncaster, York, Hull, Beverley, Bridlington, and Scarborough.

East Yorkshire Motor Services provide regular services to Hull, Pocklington, Beverley, Bridlington, and Scarborough.

== Demography ==
Population
Year	1801	1811	1821	1831	1841	1851	1881	1891	1901	1911	1921	1931	1951	1961	1971	1981	1991	2001	2011	2021
Total	1,411	1,857	2,303	2,660	3,223	3,963	5,937	5,700	6,036	5,676	5,791	6,040	7,006	6,892	7,895	9,100	10,062	11,477	13,080	13,457

== Religion ==
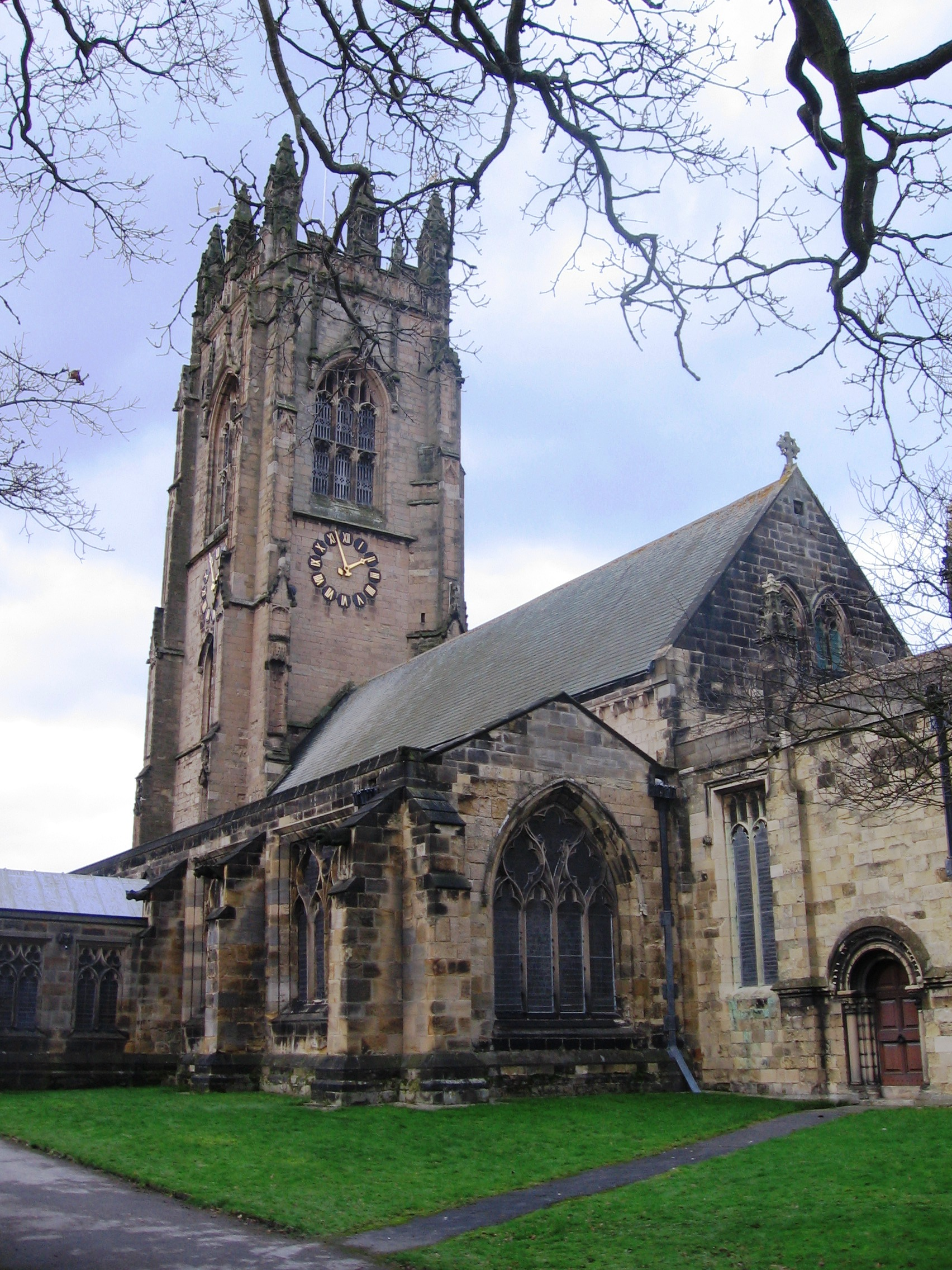
All Saints' Church

There are nine churches in Driffield, which work together as 'Churches Together in Driffield'.

The Anglican All Saints' Church, Driffield was designated a Grade I listed building in 1963 and is now recorded in the National Heritage List for England, maintained by Historic England. St Mary's Church, Little Driffield is within the same benefice as All Saints. There was once a second Anglican Church in Driffield itself, dedicated to Saint John and located on St Johns Road, but it has been demolished.

The small Roman Catholic Our Lady and Saint Edward's Church, Driffield was built in 1886. The Methodist Church stands on Middle Street North. The former 1880 building, was demolished in November 2018 and replaced by a modern building. Bourne Methodists is a Primitive Methodist Church, sited on Westgate. The Salvation Army have a building on The Mount.

Driffield Christian Fellowship is an Elim Pentecostal church who have a building on Wansford Road. Their church service is held in the Performing Arts Hall at Driffield School. The Congregational Church is situated on Exchange Street. The Revive Church meets in the Community Centre on Mill Street.

== Traditions ==
The age-old tradition of Scrambling is unique to the town of Driffield and has its origins in the 18th century. The event takes place a couple of days into the New Year. Children walk through the main street shouting an ancient rhyme to shopkeepers in return for money and goodies. The cry is "Here we are at our town's end...With a shoulder of mutton and a crown to spend...Are we downhearted?..No!...Shall we win?...Yes!..."

It is also tradition for the townspeople of Driffield to congregate in the market place on New Year's Eve and listen for the church bells ringing in the new year.

== Climate ==
The climate in Driffield is warm and temperate, with higher than average rainfall. This climate is considered to be Cfb according to the Köppen-Geiger climate classification. In Driffield, the average annual temperature is 9.5 °C. The average annual rainfall is 719 mm.

Climate data for Climate data for Driffield
Month	Jan	Feb	Mar	Apr	May	Jun	Jul	Aug	Sep	Oct	Nov	Dec	Year
Mean daily maximum °C (°F)	—	5.8 (42.4)	8.2 (46.8)	10.7 (51.3)	14.0 (57.2)	16.8 (62.2)	19.6 (67.3)	19.7 (67.5)	16.6 (61.9)	12.4 (54.3)	8.4 (47.1)	5.8 (42.4)	12.0 (53.6)
Mean daily minimum °C (°F)	0.6 (33.1)	0.6 (33.1)	1.9 (35.4)	3.4 (38.1)	6.0 (42.8)	8.6 (47.5)	10.9 (51.6)	11.0 (51.8)	9.4 (48.9)	6.6 (43.9)	3.4 (38.1)	1.0 (33.8)	5.3 (41.5)
Record low °C (°F)	−5 (23)	−9 (16)	−6 (21)	−3 (27)	1 (34)	2 (36)	5 (41)	5 (41)	−1 (30)	−4 (25)	−8 (18)	−11 (12)	−11 (12)
Average precipitation mm (inches)	65.7 (2.59)	51.6 (2.03)	56.8 (2.24)	58.9 (2.32)	49.9 (1.96)	69.8 (2.75)	58.3 (2.30)	64.1 (2.52)	62.9 (2.48)	68.4 (2.69)	74.0 (2.91)	71.0 (2.80)	751.1 (29.57)
Average precipitation days	13.0	10.7	11.0	10.0	9.6	10.5	9.9	10.6	9.4	12.0	13.3	12.4	132.3
Mean monthly sunshine hours	52.3	76.6	110.0	149.5	198.8	179.1	191.9	178.4	139.4	104.8	64.4	46.6	1,491.7
Source: Met Office

== Sport ==
Driffield was formerly home to Driffield Mariners Football Club, who won three Hull Sunday League titles in recent years. Now to this present day, there are two men's teams: Great Driffield AFC, who play in the Humber Premier League Premier Division, and Great Driffield Rovers, who play in the East Riding County League Championship. Driffield used to have its own football league, Driffield and District League which was founded in 1919 before its final season was declared null and void due to the COVID-19 pandemic in 2020.

The town has a cricket club, the first team of which play in the ECB Yorkshire Premier League North. First class cricketers Andrew Gale, Rich Pyrah, Steven Patterson, Jonny Bairstow, Ishara Amerasinghe and Abid Ali have all played for the club.

Driffield RUFC is a member of the RFU and Yorkshire RFU, playing its senior fixtures in the Regional 1 North East and Women's Championship North 2 leagues. The club field five senior teams (four men's and a women's), a colts team (both boys and girls) and mini/juniors (at every age group from under 7's to under 17's).

Driffield Hockey Club play their home matches at Driffield Sports Centre and currently field three men's teams and four ladies' teams, as well as juniors and vets sections. For a catchment area the size of Driffield, the club is relatively successful, with both the men's and ladies first XIs being promoted from their respective YHA Yorkshire Premier Divisions at the end of the 2013–14 season (6th tier of English Hockey) to the North League Division 2 East and North League Division 2 South East respectively (5th tier of English Hockey).

Driffield has an 18-hole golf club that has been at its present location since 1934.

Driffield featured on the route of the 2017 Tour de Yorkshire.

Driffield has a sports centre located on Bridlington Road, which opened in 2009 replacing the old sports centre (now owned by Driffield School). The new sports centre includes a main pool and learner pool, sports hall, a 50-piece gym, and a studio/multi-use room.

== Media ==
Driffield and the Wolds are served by the local newspaper, Driffield & Wolds Weekly, launched in August 2015. The Driffield Times ceased publication in 2016.

Local news and television programmes are provided by BBC Yorkshire and Lincolnshire and ITV Yorkshire. Television signals are received from the Belmont TV transmitter.

The town's local radio stations are BBC Radio Humberside on 95.9 FM, Nation Radio East Yorkshire on 99.8 FM, Capital Yorkshire on 105.8 FM, Hits Radio East Yorkshire & North Lincolnshire on 96.9 FM and Great Driffield Radio, launched in November 2018 on 107.2 FM, broadcasts across the town and surrounding villages.

== In popular culture ==
Slaughterhouse Studios was a recording studio in the town between 1985 and 1992. Bands including Napalm Death, The Mission, and most notably Happy Mondays would record there.

== Twin towns ==
Driffield is twinned with Saint Affrique, France.

== Notable people ==
- Benjamin Fawcett, 19th century woodblock colour printer
- Hazel Gaynor, author
- Edwina Hayes, musician
- Alexander Francis Lydon, woodblock colour printer who worked with Benjamin Fawcett
- James Mosley, British librarian, preservationist and historian
- Curtis Woodhouse, former professional footballer and boxer
- Mick Woodmansey, drummer with David Bowie's band the Spiders from Mars

== See also ==
- Listed buildings in Driffield
