= Agde =

- Commune
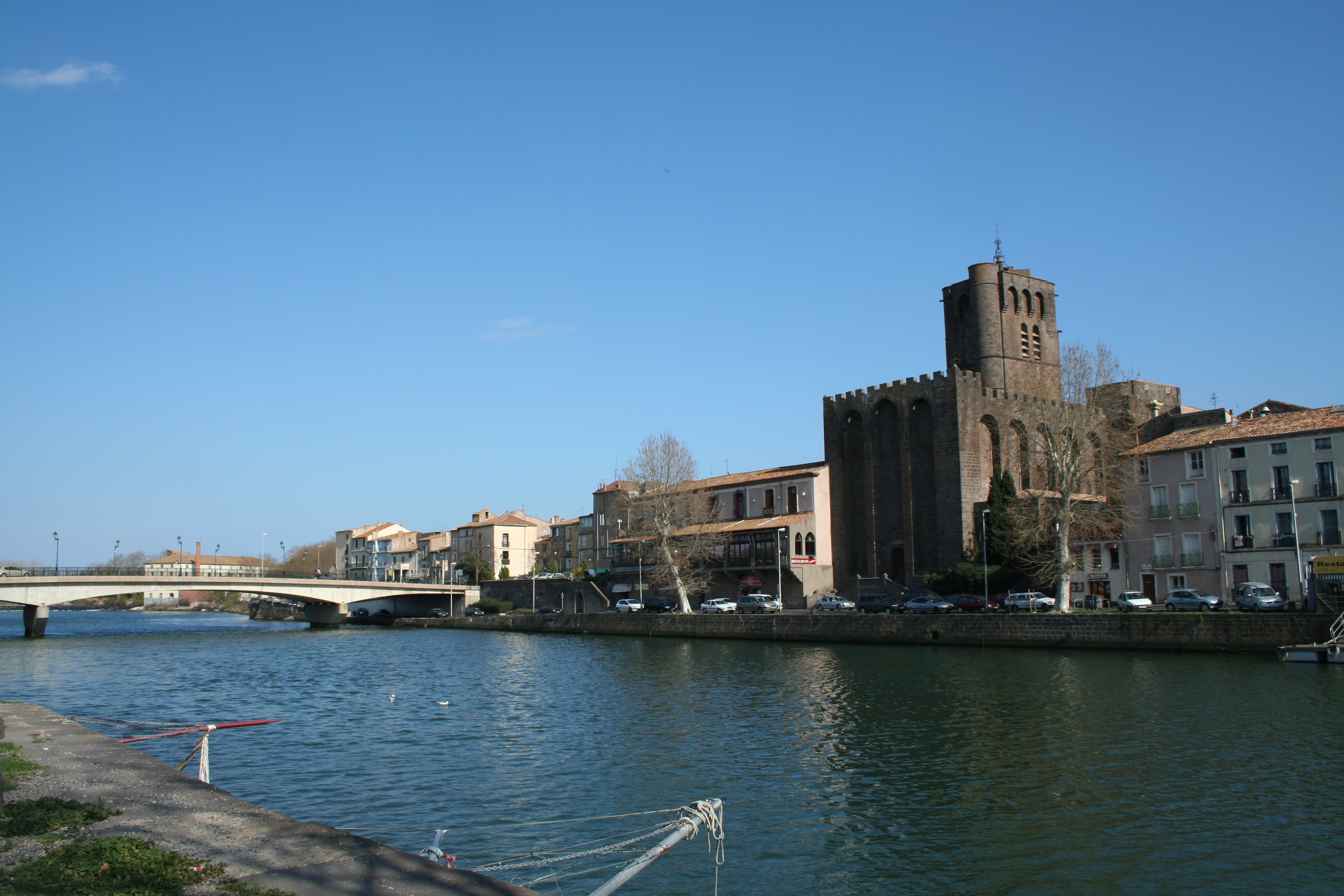
- The cathedral

- Coat of arms
- Location of Agde
- Location within France Location within Occitanie
- Coordinates: 43°18′39″N 3°28′33″E
- Country: France
- Region: Occitania
- Department: Hérault
- Arrondissement: Béziers
- Canton: Agde
- Intercommunality: CA Hérault Méditerranée

Government
  - Mayor (2026–32): Aurélien Lopez-Liguori
- Area^{1}: 50.81 km^{2} (19.62 sq mi)
- Elevation: 5 m (16 ft)
- Highest elevation: 110 m (360 ft)
- Lowest elevation: 0 m (0 ft)
- Population (2023): 29,939
  - Density: 589.2/km^{2} (1,526/sq mi)
- Demonym(s): Agathois, f. Agathoise (French) dagdenc/agatenc, f. dagdenca/agatenca (Occitan)
- Time zone: UTC+01:00 (CET)
  - Summer (DST): UTC+02:00 (CEST)
- INSEE/Postal code: 34003 /34300
- ^{1} French Land Register data, which excludes lakes, ponds, glaciers > 1 km^{2} (0.386 sq mi or 247 acres) and river estuaries.

Agde (French: [aɡd], Occitan: [ˈadːe, ˈatːe]) is a resort town and commune in the southern French department of Hérault, Occitania. It is the Mediterranean port of the Canal du Midi. It is situated on an ancient basalt volcano, hence being nicknamed "Black Pearl of the Mediterranean".

== Location ==
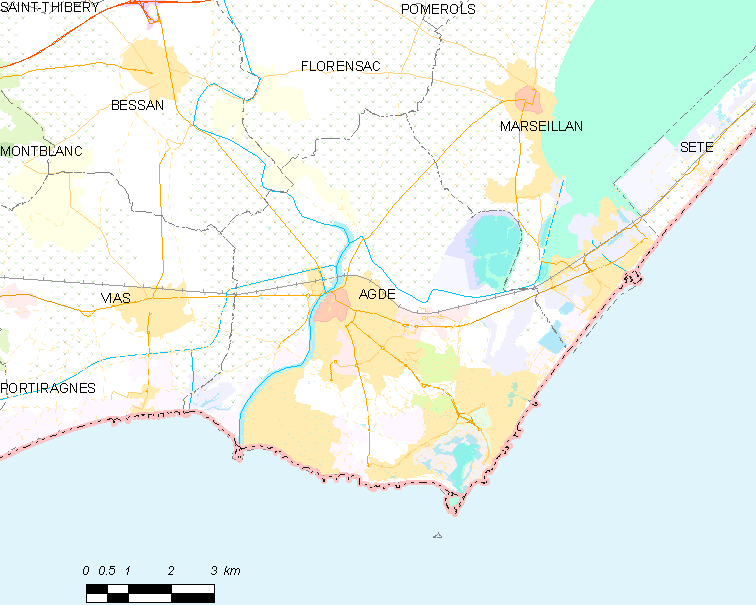
Map

Agde is located on the Hérault river, 4 kilometres (2 miles) from the Mediterranean Sea, and 750 kilometres (466 miles) from Paris. The Canal du Midi connects to the Hérault river at the Agde Round Lock ("L'Écluse Ronde d'Agde") just north of Agde, and the Hérault flows into the Mediterranean at Le Grau d'Agde. Agde station has high-speed rail direct connections northbound to Paris, Lille, Geneva, southbound to Perpignan as well as Spain. Agde has regional services to Narbonne, Montpellier, Nimes and Avignon.

== History ==
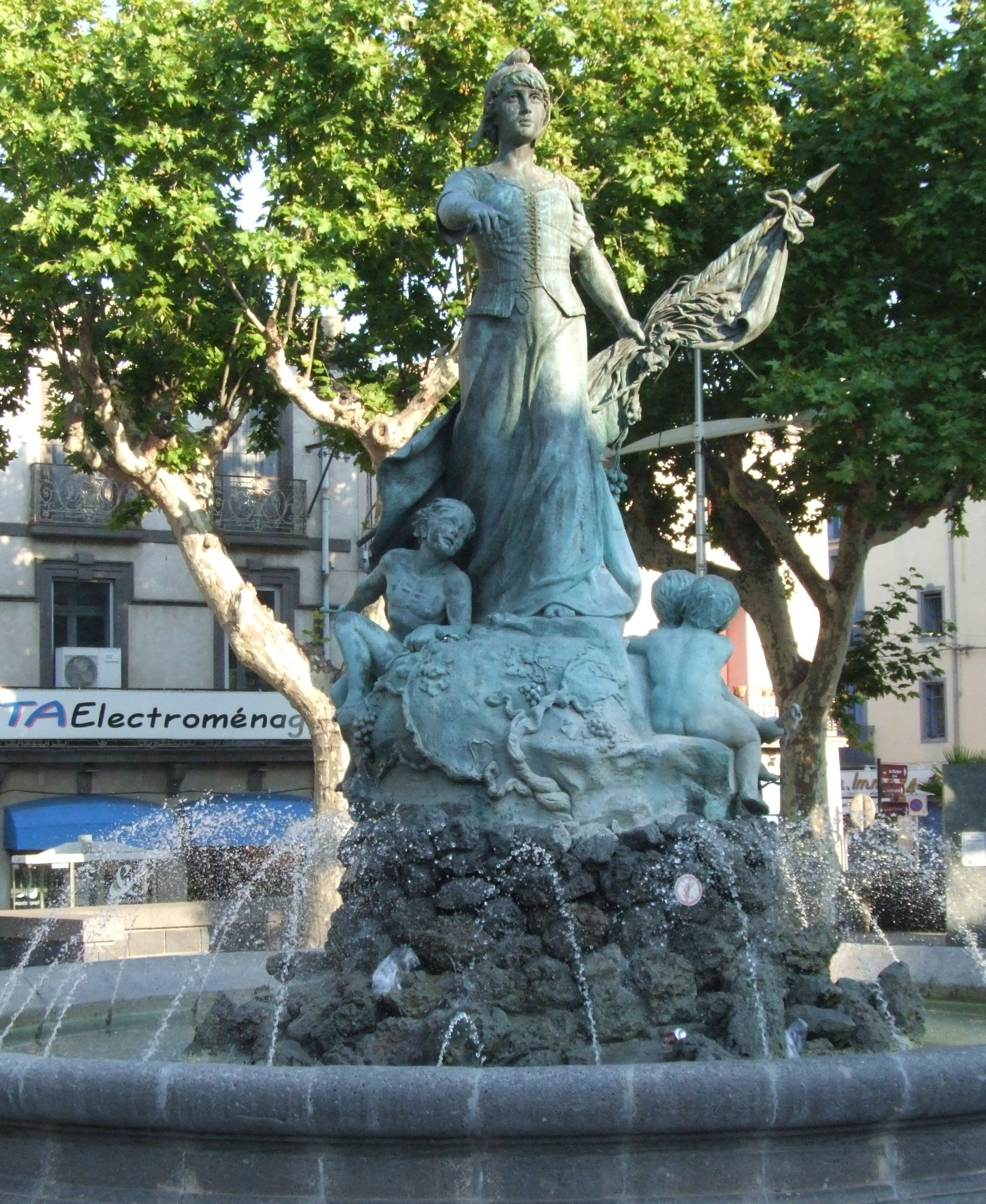
Fountain of the Republic in town centre

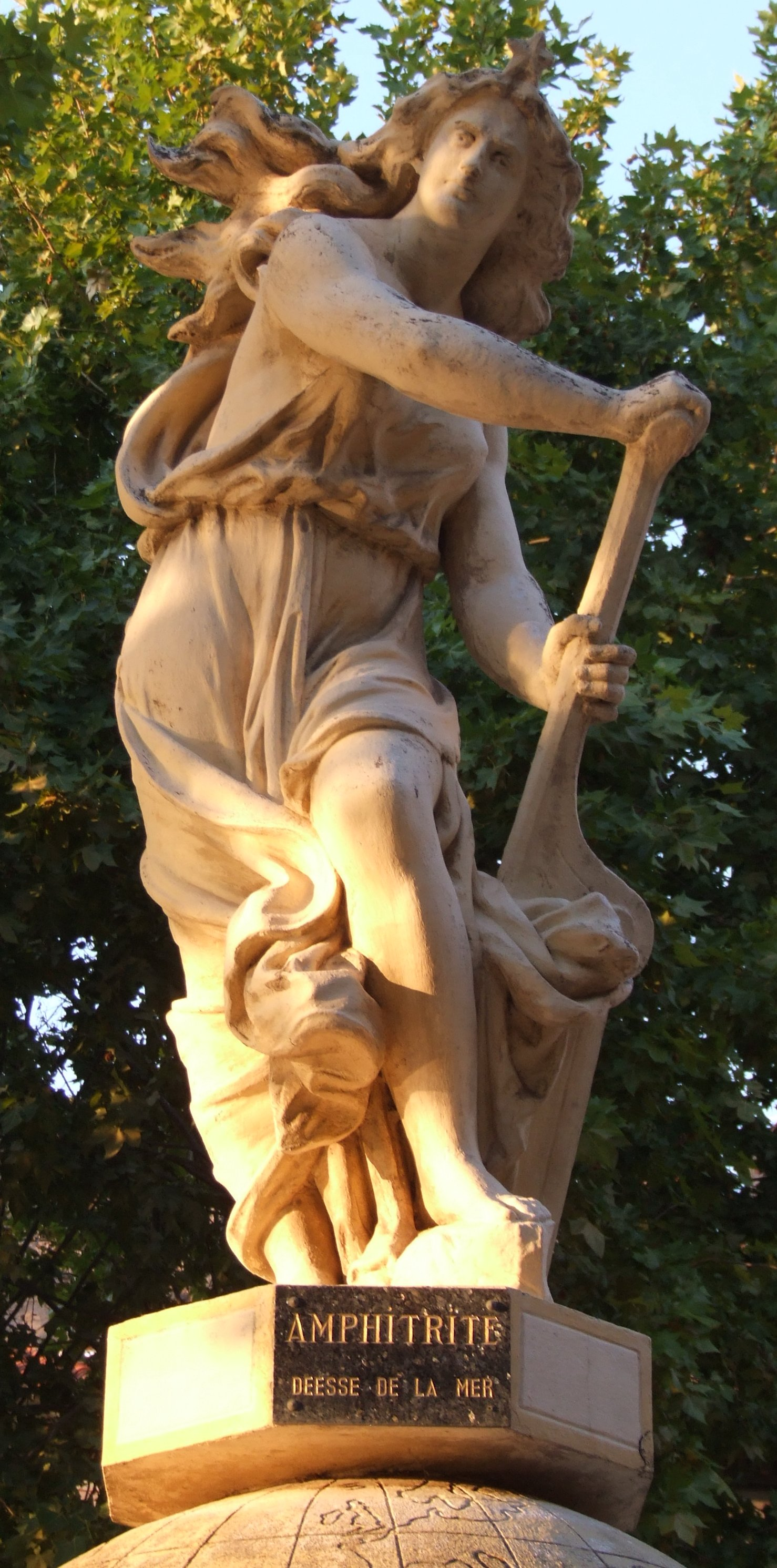
Amphitrite in the place de la Marine at the river, by Léon François Chervet

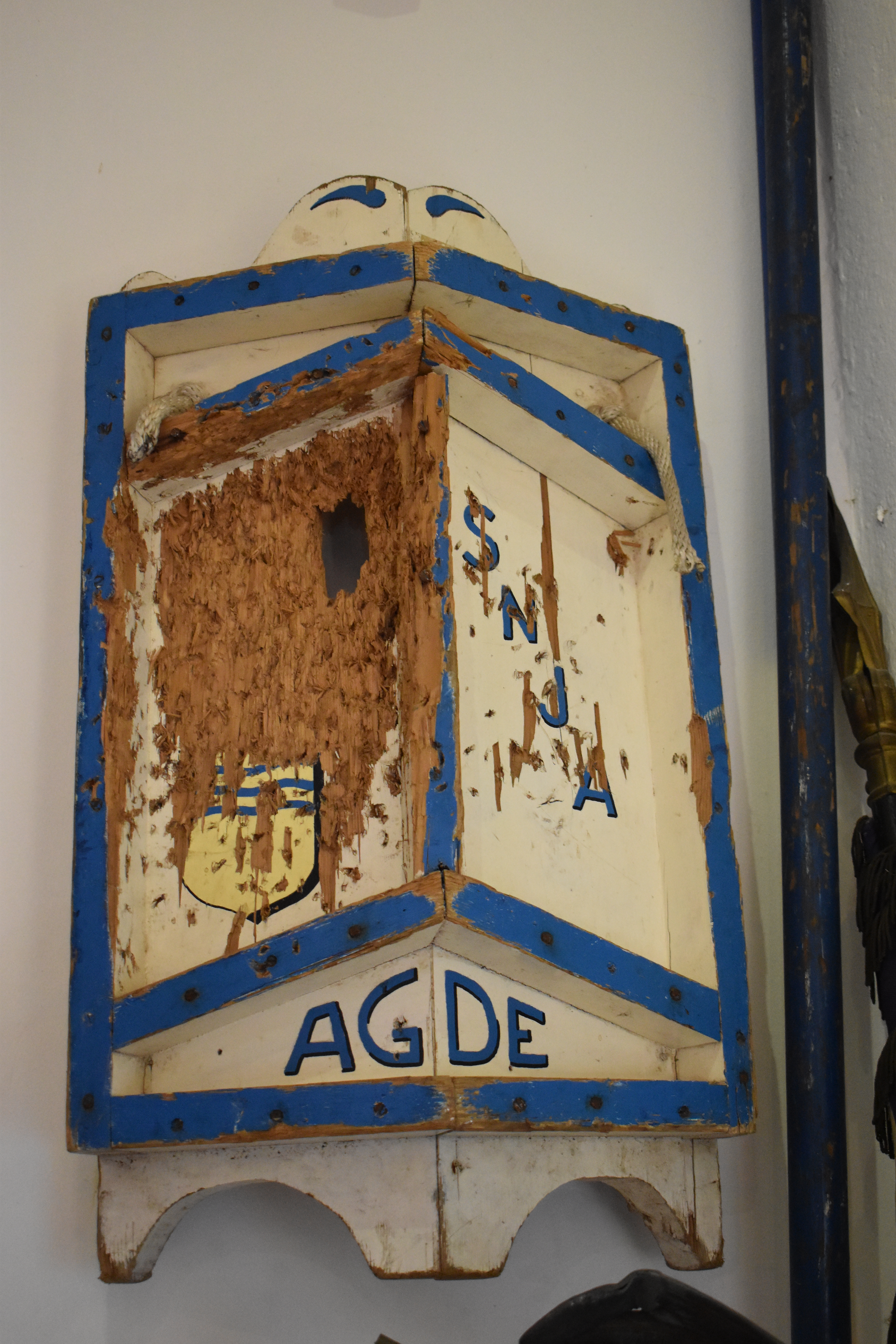
Joust shield

=== Foundation ===
Agde (525 BCE) is one of the oldest towns in France, after Béziers (575 BCE) and Marseille (Massilia; 600 BCE). Agde (Agathe Tyche, "good fortune") was a 5th-century BCE Greek colony settled by Phocaeans from Massilia.

2,500 years ago, the Hérault river had three arms : "grau de Vias", "grau d'Agde", "grau d'Ambonne"; a delta was formed in the middle of Agde volcanoes, and the eastern arm was leading to the Bagnas pond (occitan name Banhas), which was largely drained in the Middle Ages when mills were built with constant flow on the main arm (the bishop's mill still remains).

The Greek name was Agathe (Ancient Greek: Ἀγάθη). The symbol of the city, the bronze Ephebe of Agde, of the 4th century BCE, recovered from the fluvial sands of the Hérault, was joined in December 2001 by two Early Imperial Roman bronzes, of a child and of Eros, which had possibly been on their way to a villa in Gallia Narbonensis when they were lost in a shipwreck.

=== Development ===
The inlet in the Hérault river, Grau d'Agde, became from the Antique to the Eighteenth century period the most important port in this occitanian region of the Mediterranée for trade.

From the beginning of the fifth century (until the French Revolution), the city of Agde developed in the upstream area that was not subject to flooding and was the seat of a bishopric. But "It was subjugated by the Roman Empire, the Visigoths [from Italy] and the Saracens [from Spain] before becoming definitively Christian in 759."

Around the beginning of the 13th century, the town was administered by consuls, a forerunner of modern municipalities. Development took place on the main rock, sheltered from flooding, and urban districts appeared, with the concept of the urban island, named after the person who paid the highest tax to the king and the bishopric. The town was divided into two parts: the part on the rock and the part around the rock, where farmland was divided into hamlets of properties around churches.

The fortifications appeared in the 12th century around the rock, in the 14th century extended around the town; During the French Revolution of 1848 the fortifications were demolished except for the small part next to the current Tourist Office.

At the end of the 16th century the lieutenant-general of Languedoc Joyeuse built Fort Brescou. Later Cardinal Richelieu undertook the construction of a roadstead for an Harbour, a strategic point in the Mediterranean area. The work, made difficult by the gradual silting up of the coastline, was abandoned after the death of the Cardinal. Fort Richelieu remains in place.

The paths and squares are named in Occitan, with French added over time, streets have existed since the French Revolution, when the population and birthplaces were registered.

Until the French Revolution, Agde was owned by the bishopric: through the wars of religion all seigniorial possessions become the property of the episcopate. And until then Vias was part of the commune and until the seventeenth century, the part of the Étang de Thau up to and including Sète was part of the diocese; further north it is the diocese of the bishop of the most important Maguelone cathedral. Today only the chapter house remains in Agde.

At the end of the 18th century, when tall sail ships gave way to motor merchant ships, Agde changed its activity towards the exploitation of the land, market gardening, olives and fruits. The local viticulture then experienced is one of its greatest moments of prosperity until the phylloxera.

With the transition to the steam engine, the port of Agde became a shipping point for foodstuffs, it was connected to the railway on a state planning decision concerning the Canal du Midi; The floating bridges before the suspension iron bridge 1836 are the solution to the overflow of the Hérault (the entry carries a tax for 9 years). The episcopal palace is cut in two for the passage of the bridge - the right part became the actual Hôtel de la Galiote, the left part the gendarmerie and the prison (which were demolished in 1982).

In the 19th century the old 17th century ice houses of Agde became reservoirs allowing the distribution of water by pumping through cast iron pipes. But because of the sometimes brackish water pumped into the town from the Hérault river (depending on the season and the drought), the municipal water supply sometimes failed; In 1966, an alluvial resource from the bed of the coastal river was installed 4 km upstream from the town. This was necessary because of the new development of the modern seaside resort.

Public lighting using electricity (from the Moulin des Evèques) in Agde was planned in 1890 (electricity in a low head dam was also installed by Laurens in his Château). In 1929 the Compagnie de Distribution Electrique du Midi took over the municipal and private contract. In 1946 Électricité de France manages the electricity factory (production stops in 1951).

During the late 19th century Belle Epoque, at the Mediterranean shore, the development of the French Riviera with the Train Bleu, instituted winter aristocratic cosmopolitan tourism starting in 1880 around Monaco and its grand hotels; An Agde native, Emmanuel Laurens, an heir to a fortune, bought the "St Gervais Villa" in Saint-Raphaël, Var (1898). At the same time he built in Agde "Belle-Isle" the "Château Laurens", the marquant concrete Art Nouveau building in Occitania, with its private train station.

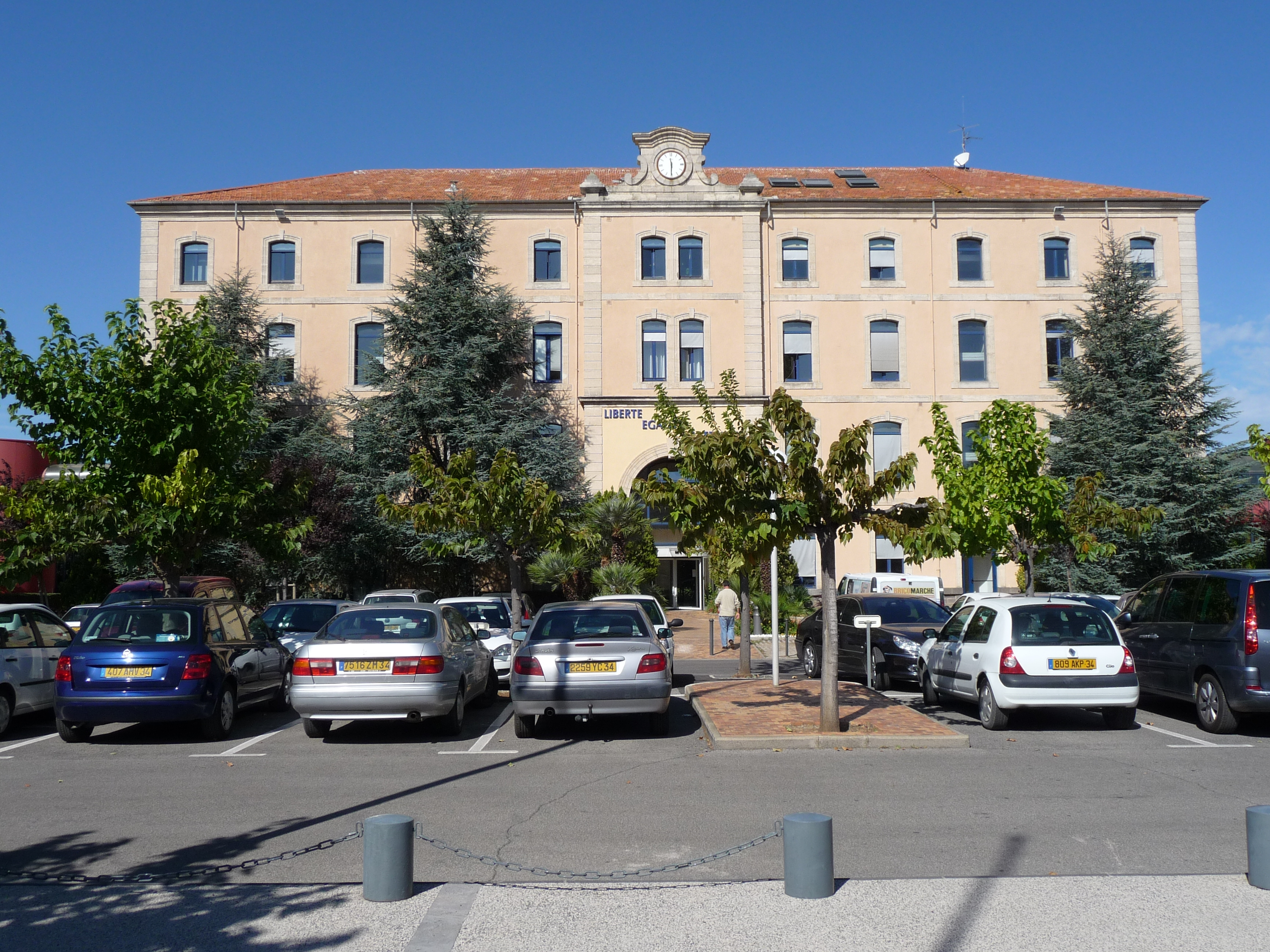
The Hôtel de Ville

The Hôtel de Ville (town hall) was erected as a military barracks in 1892.

In the old town center, the 1960s municipality had to rebuild the entire infrastructure due to decrepitude and population growth. 1969, the local abbatoirs are closed.

After immediate World War II the summer mass tourism was created in campsites and in 1960s' some very large and high residences were integrated in the "new urbanism". Actual shore development in Occitania began in the 60's following first waterfront in Grau d'Agde with numerous campsites.

The Mission Racine aimed to revitalize the economy of the region between Béziers and Sète, and make Cap d'Agde "the holiday port of Toulouse", the decrepit little town of Agde fully depends on Béziers.

The main marina (Port) was designed next to the location of the cape small fishing port (Cap d'Agde). It replaces the former salt marsh, in use 1912–1916. The fishing port of the Hérault river has been modernised with its professional fish market hall. The river's shipyards, which are mixed with pleasure boats and small fishing boats, succeeded the wooden boat yards. "1960: The president's plan is actually to make from the coast of Occitania the "French Florida".

The heads of the inter-ministerial mission developed collective facilities to attract the greatest number of tourists: holiday centres and camps of the nationalised PTT, EDF, SNCF; holiday village houses with Belgian, Netherlands, German investments. Campsites are created, one with the first naturist settlement in France. About leisure, tennis courts, discotheques, amusement parks (an aquatic park) are built. The National Forestry Office with arboriculturists (e.g. Vilmorin) contributed to the creation of green spaces in the resort, and reforestation. Hundreds of thousands of seedlings are then distributed free of charge to individuals.

The naturist campsite became an important tourist complex outside the city, and in its vicinity the tennis courts was the major theme for the development of housing estates.

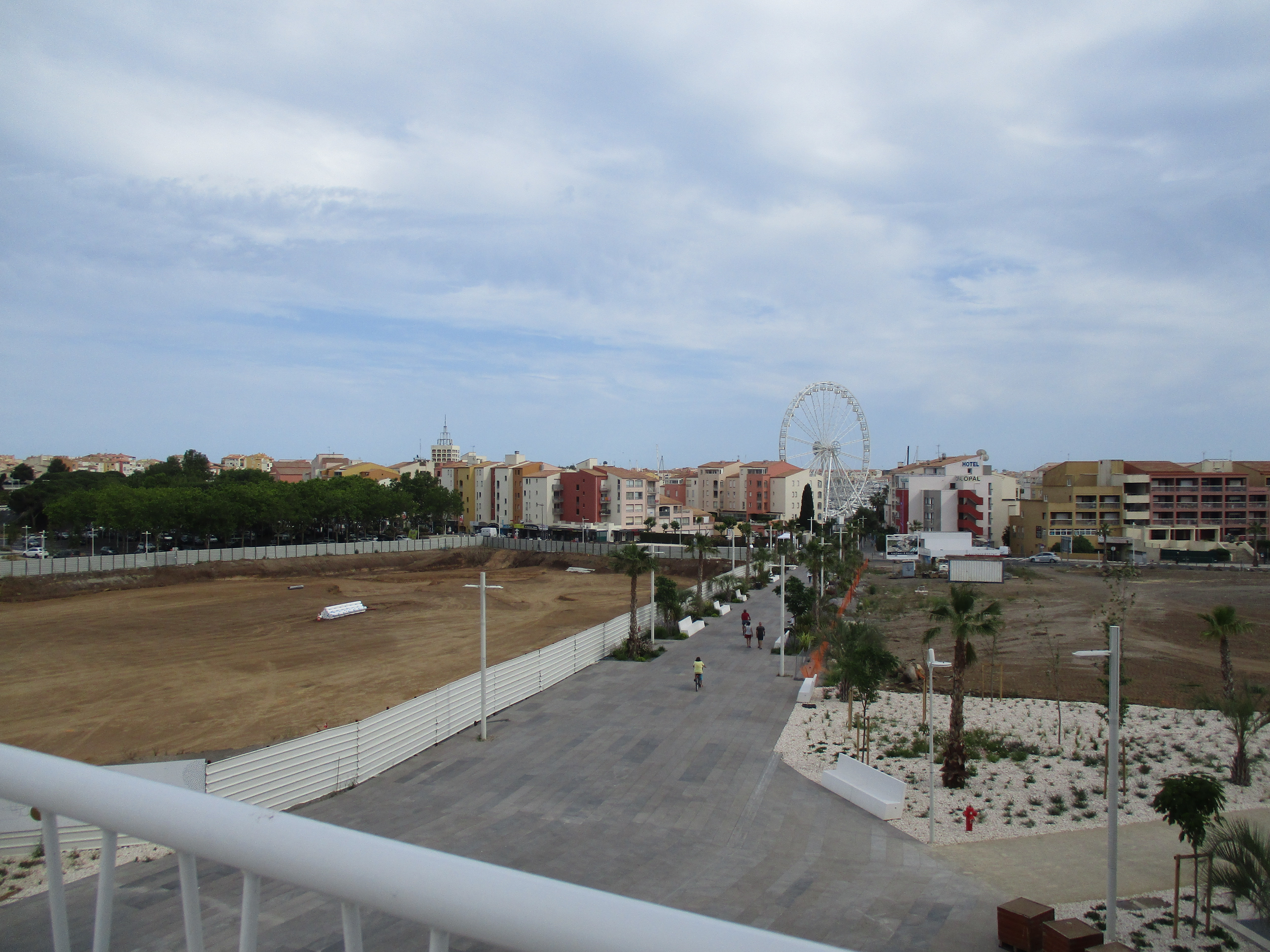
Cap d'Agde 2019: construction of the new Centre-Cap, image of the new valuable residences district taken from the new Palais des Congrès, (and behind the new Barrière casino).

Since 2007 the Sodéal (Economic development society of Agde and the coast (70% of capital owned by the town) ammenages the marinas on the Hérault river and the shore, main one Le Port de Cap d'Agde.

Urban sprawl has been taking place for first twenty years of the 21st century between Le Cap and Grau d'Agde, and this latter place is densifying from its postwar existing hollydays habitat on small plots among large empty ones. In the 21st century, green spaces are reduced to housing and are no longer accessible to the public.

After the installation of basic urban networks, going further, in the same time, cycling infrastructure is reamenaged because of car traffic jams in the 2010s. And municipal car parks receive solar panels in 2017 2019.

2021-2024 Project for extended railway station and the new marina on the Canal du Midi started with destroying the retail buildings around Hôtel Riquet, the Agde offices of the canal's founder.

Access to the city tunnel under the railroad line was opened in 2023, after two years of construction, while the most central space, the Promenade and its market, is transformed with the digging of a scheduled car parking lot that began in 2023.

=== Historical act in Agde : French Clergy and property ===
In the history of Roman Catholicism in France, the Council of Agde was held 10 September 506 at Agde, in Saint-André church, under the presidency of Caesarius of Arles. It was attended by thirty-five bishops, and its forty-seven genuine canons dealt "with ecclesiastical discipline". One of its canons (the seventh), forbidding ecclesiastics to sell or alienate the property of the church from which they derived their living, seems to be the earliest mention of the later system of benefices.

== Population ==
Agde's inhabitants are called Agathois in French. 10% permanent residents, the population goes up to 200,000 inhabitants in the summer (fourth of a year).

Historical population

Year	Pop.	±% p.a.
1793	6,744	—
1800	6,744	+0.00%
1806	7,639	+2.10%
1821	7,726	+0.08%
1831	8,202	+0.60%
1836	8,230	+0.07%
1841	8,251	+0.05%
1846	8,884	+1.49%
1851	9,115	+0.51%
1856	9,439	+0.70%
1861	9,747	+0.64%
1866	9,586	−0.33%
1872	8,829	−1.36%
1876	8,251	−1.68%
1881	8,170	−0.20%
1886	8,446	+0.67%
1891	7,389	−2.64%
1896	8,478	+2.79%
1901	9,533	+2.37%

Year	Pop.	±% p.a.
1906	8,435	−2.42%
1911	9,265	+1.89%
1921	8,325	−1.06%
1926	9,360	+2.37%
1931	9,605	+0.52%
1936	9,242	−0.77%
1946	7,592	−1.95%
1954	7,897	+0.49%
1962	8,751	+1.29%
1968	10,184	+2.56%
1975	11,605	+1.88%
1982	13,107	+1.75%
1990	17,583	+3.74%
1999	19,988	+1.43%
2007	21,104	+0.68%
2012	24,651	+3.16%
2017	28,609	+3.02%
2023	29,939	+0.76%

Source: EHESS and INSEE (1968-2023)

== Wine, wineyards and winemakers ==
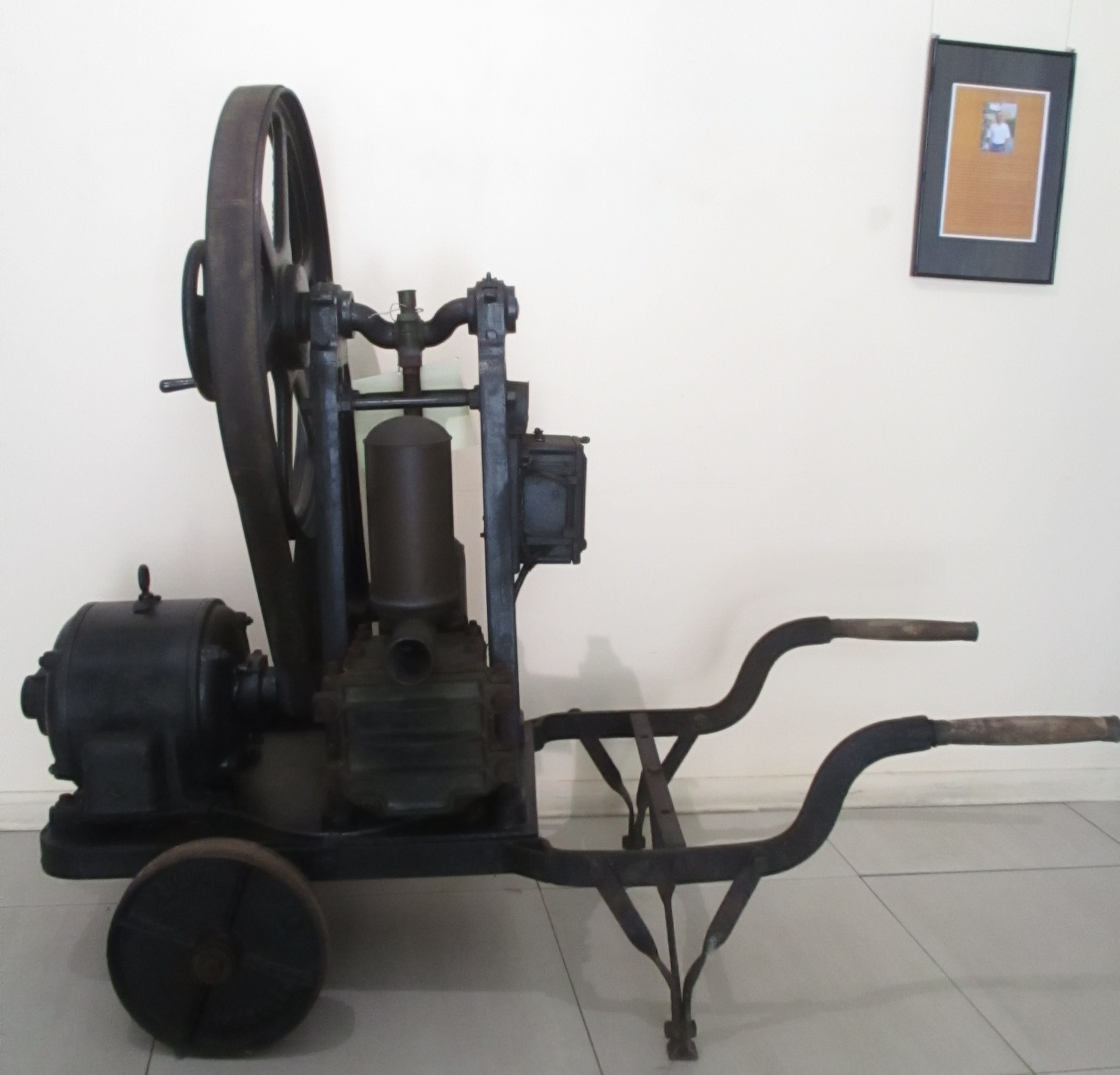
Electric wine pump "Catalane" Agde Model, (1891-92)

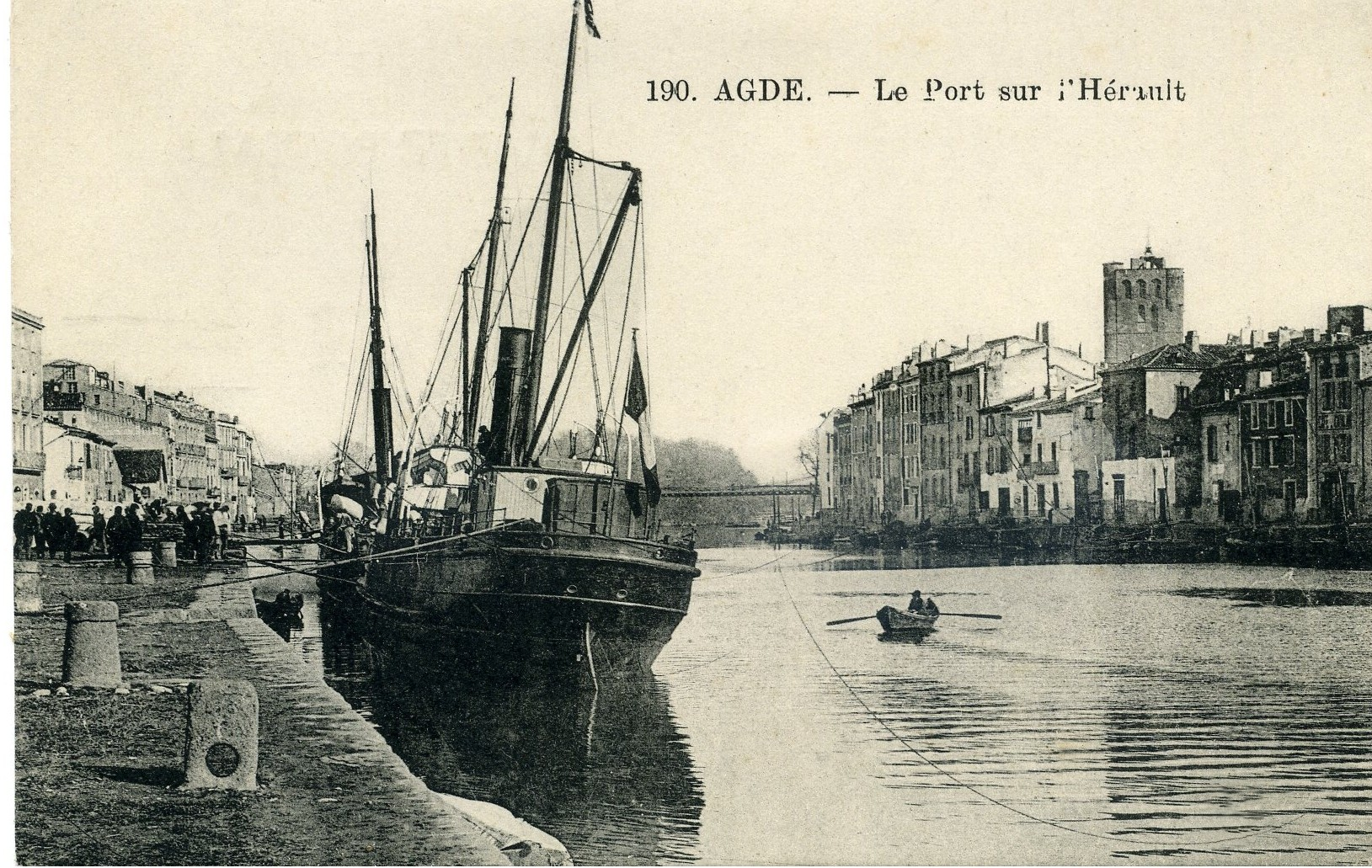
Old port in city-center (Background old bridge over Hérault river)

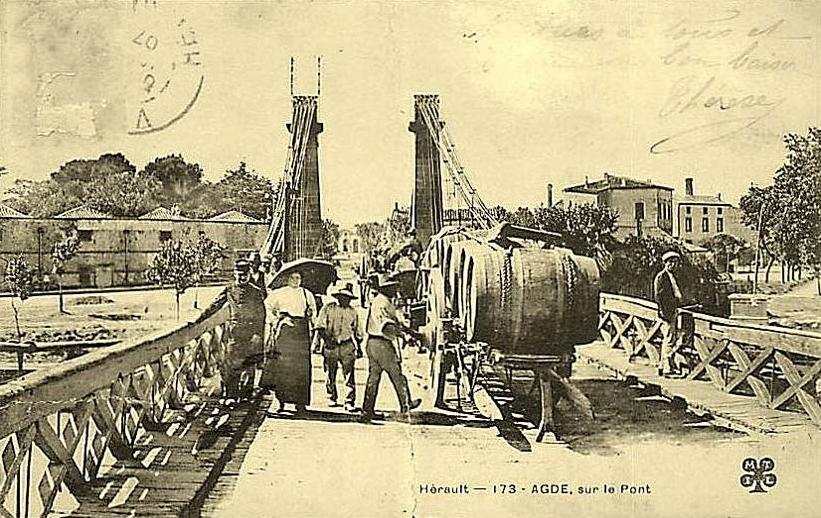
Old suspension bridge (on it trucks of wine barrels for shipping)

"À la Belle Epoque"

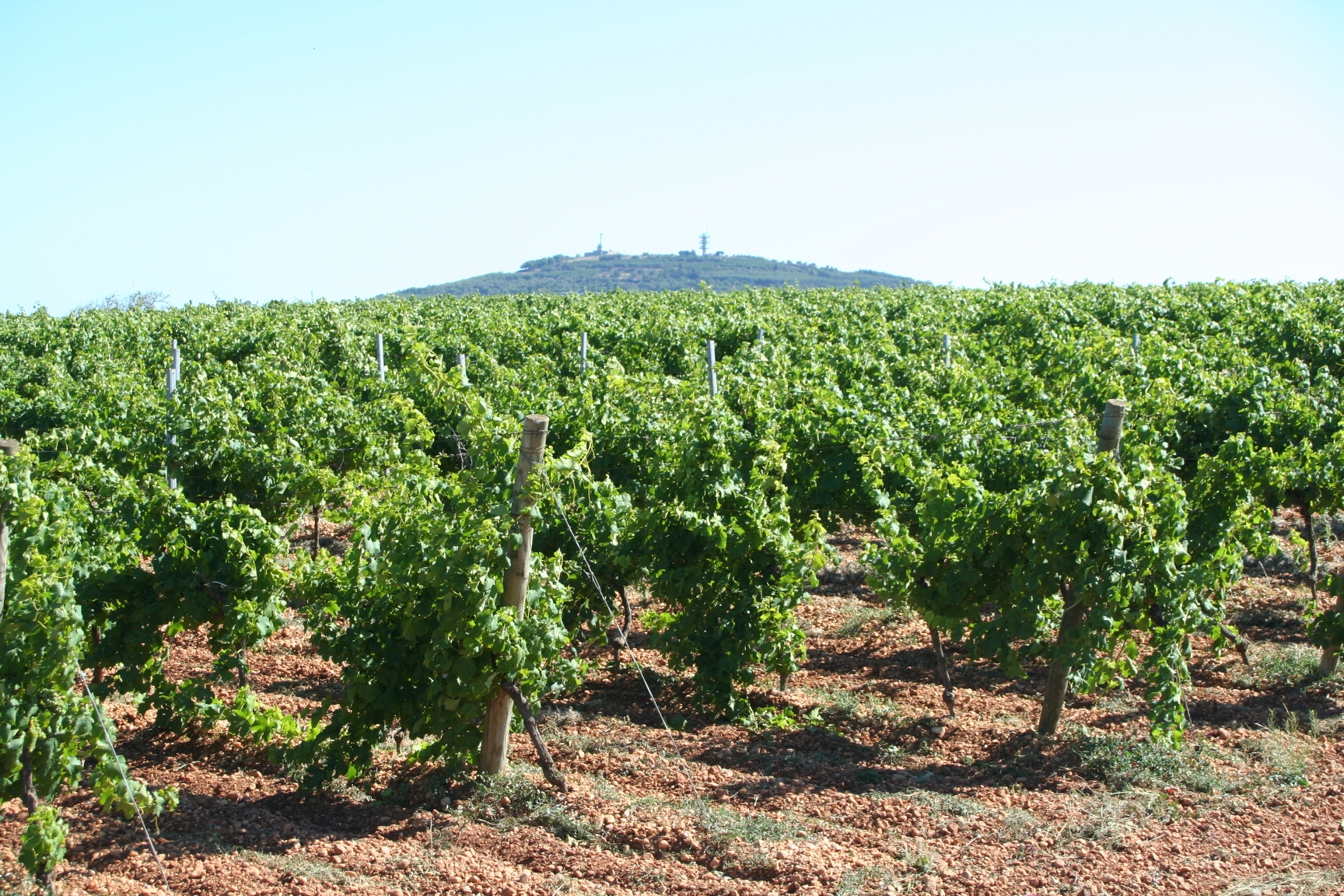
Wineyards in La Roquille, foreground Mont St Loup

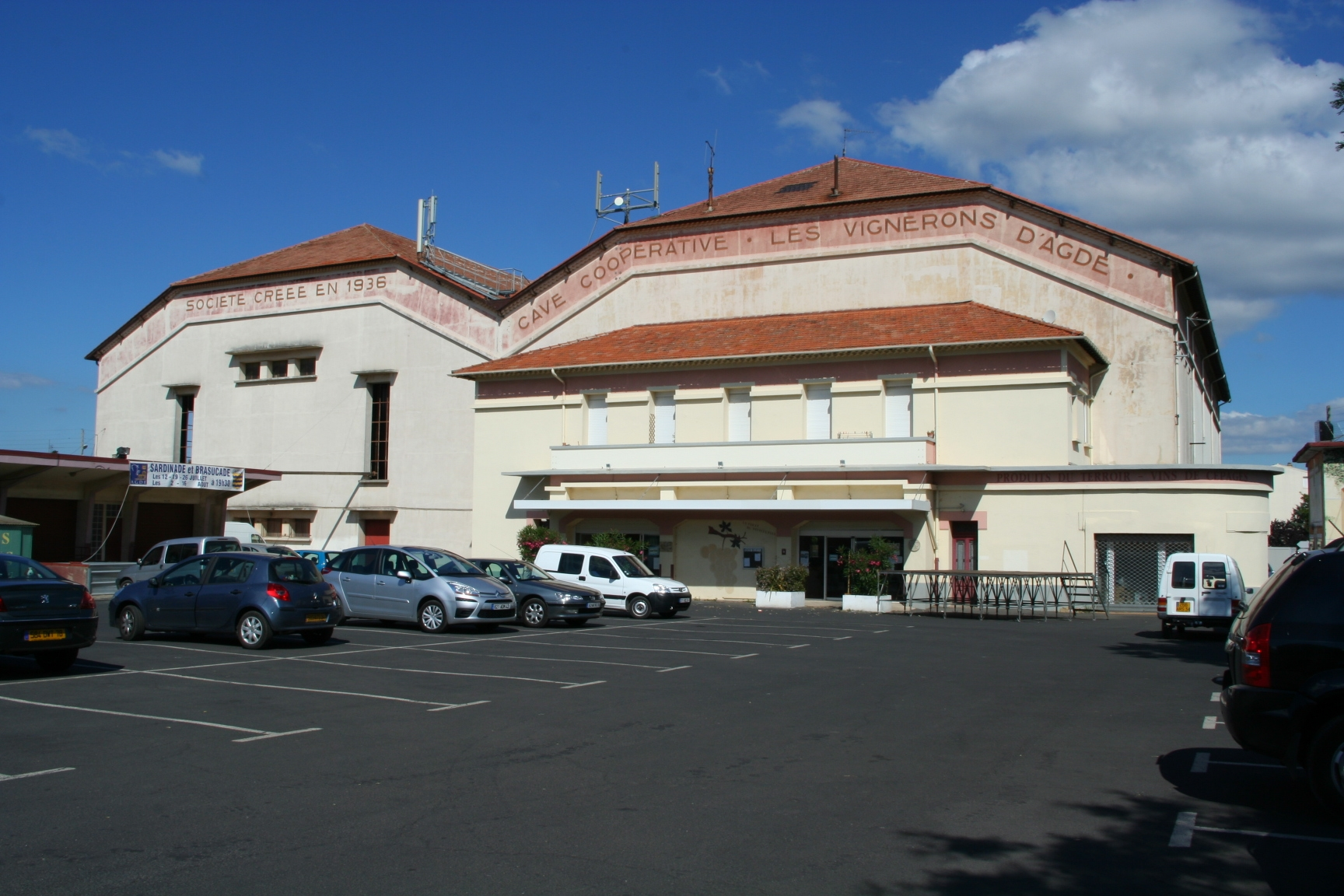
Cooperative winery, (1936-1998). 2022 West facade maintained, rehabilitated into résidence, offices

The vineyards in Agde are among the oldest in France. Viticulturists, winegrowers experienced the problems of viticulture in the 19th century with diseases. However, while Aramon was able to save the production situation (see the electric pump) in the region by cultivation near the sea, the intensive production of wine in the colony of Algeria caused both the low profitability and the low quality of Agde wines among Languedoc zone. Production began to decline. And production has plummeted since the sea-resort was planned, as housing needs space. The Richemer Cellars were born from the merger of the cooperative cellars of Agde (1936) and Marseillan (1934). However, tourist festivals are still present in the 21st century, including the Vinocap trade show, which brings together a hundred winegrowers. Stores supply wine for tourists. And if the last vineyard of Bagnas is now very small below Château Maraval with the Meyer distillery in ruins, walking in is a planned tourist-office leisure nowadays; its wine is better for "connoisseurs", old grape varieties producing piquette have been abandoned. This "Wine tourism" has been in full development for several years.

The wine-growing area of the Bagnas reserve was reduced in 2019 with the urbanization of the border running from Château Maraval down to the naturist camp: the most expensive detached villas in the town are here, as well as those at the top of the Mont St Martin with panoramic sea views, which also had vineyards starting at Richelieu beach that disappeared with the urbanisation of 1970.

== Retail parks suburb belt ==
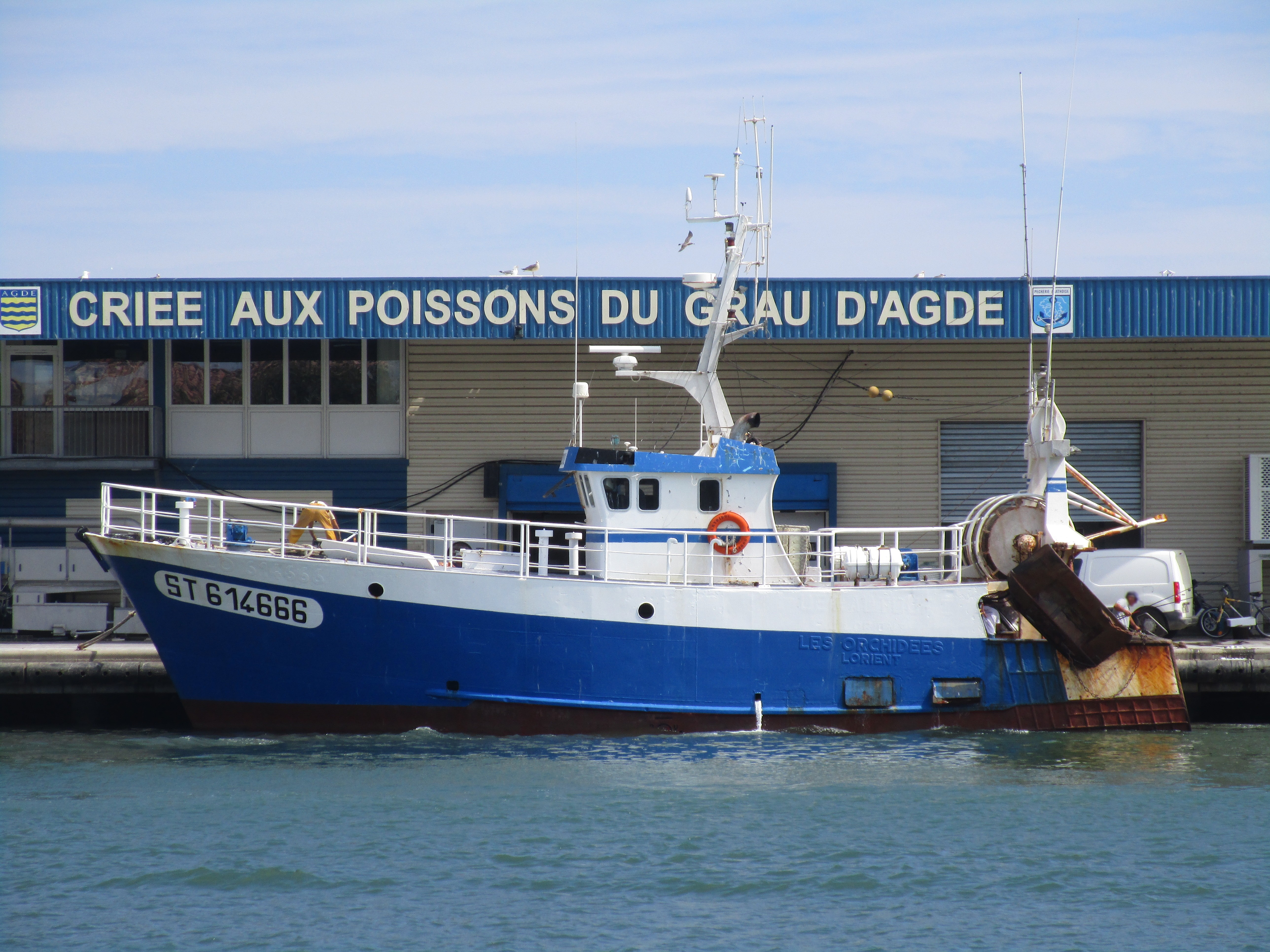
Professional fish market Grau d'Agde.

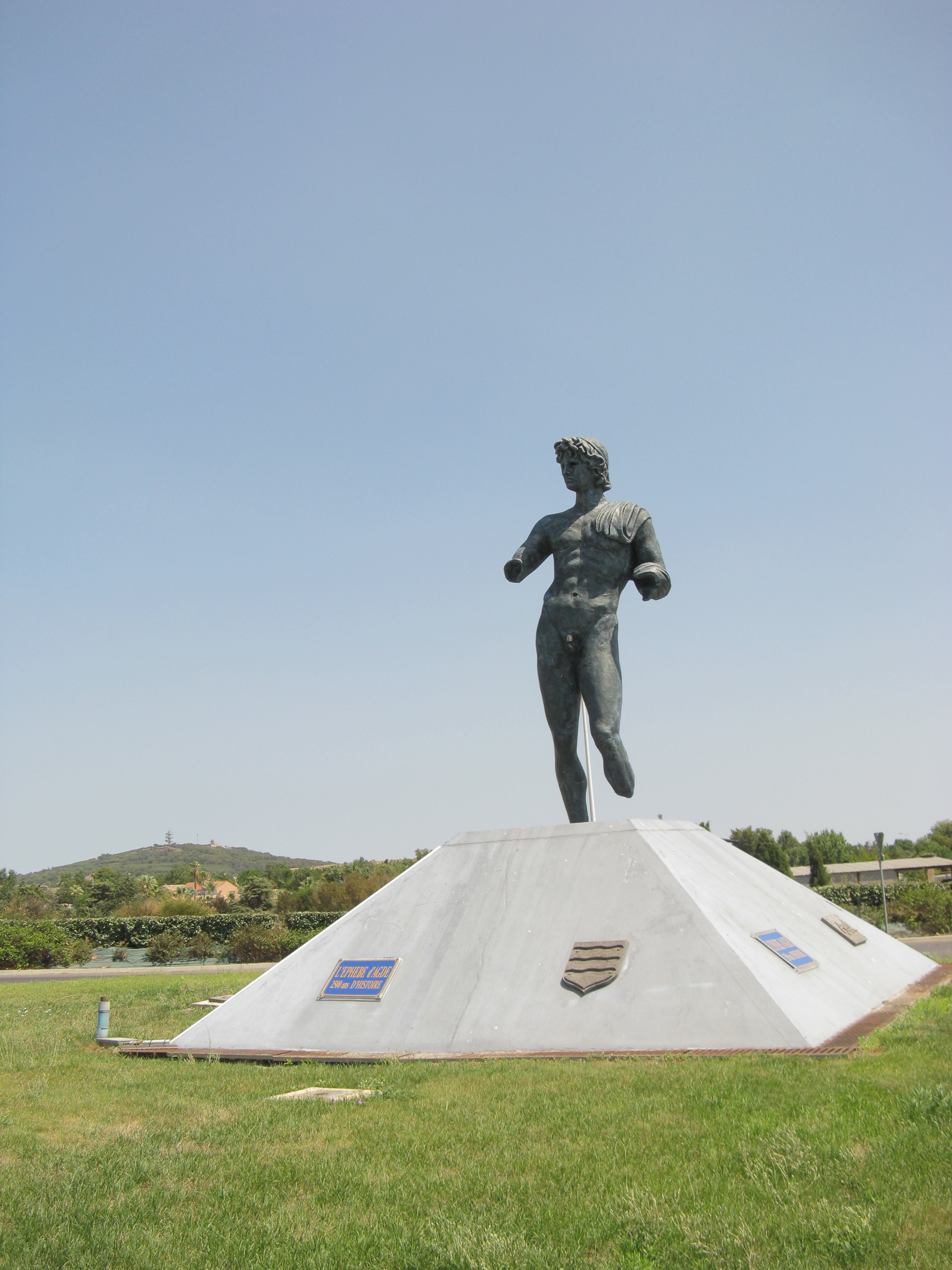
Statue of the Ephebe, roundabout above the Béziers-Sète expressway.

- Professional fish market.
- Shipchlanders facing dry dock on the Cap d'Agde marina.
- Shopping centers.
- East of town, an area for the old wine traffic via the Canal du Midi and its old railway traffic, more recently there were stocks for the trade in building-materials.
- On road towards Sète, since the 1970s, a specific area for building-materials stocks.

Since 2000, many allotments of houses reaches those Economic Activities Zones.

== Marinas ==
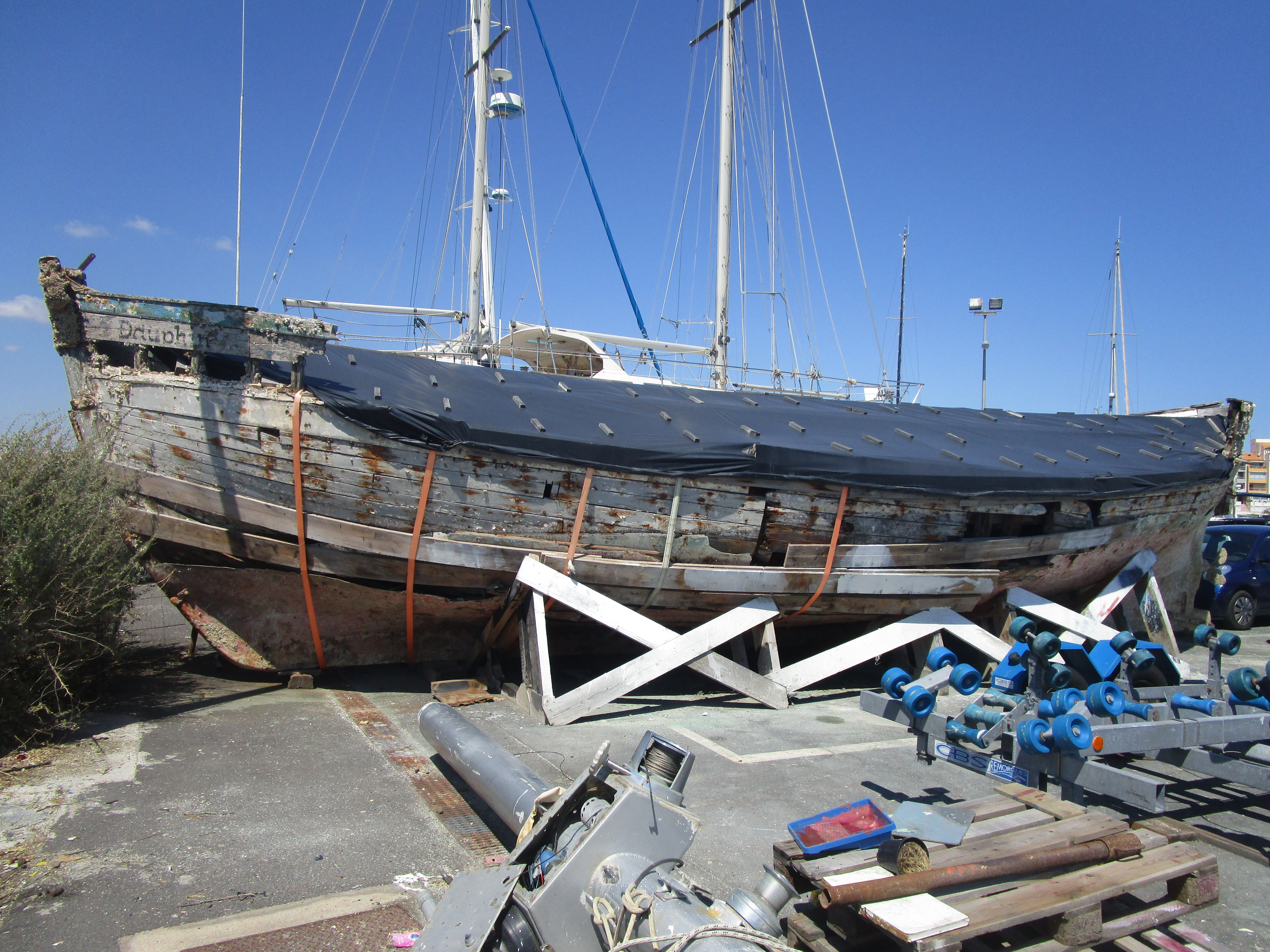
The wreck of the fishing ship Espérance 1881 at the shipyards of Grau d'Agde on August 1, 2015. It was built in 1881 at Agde

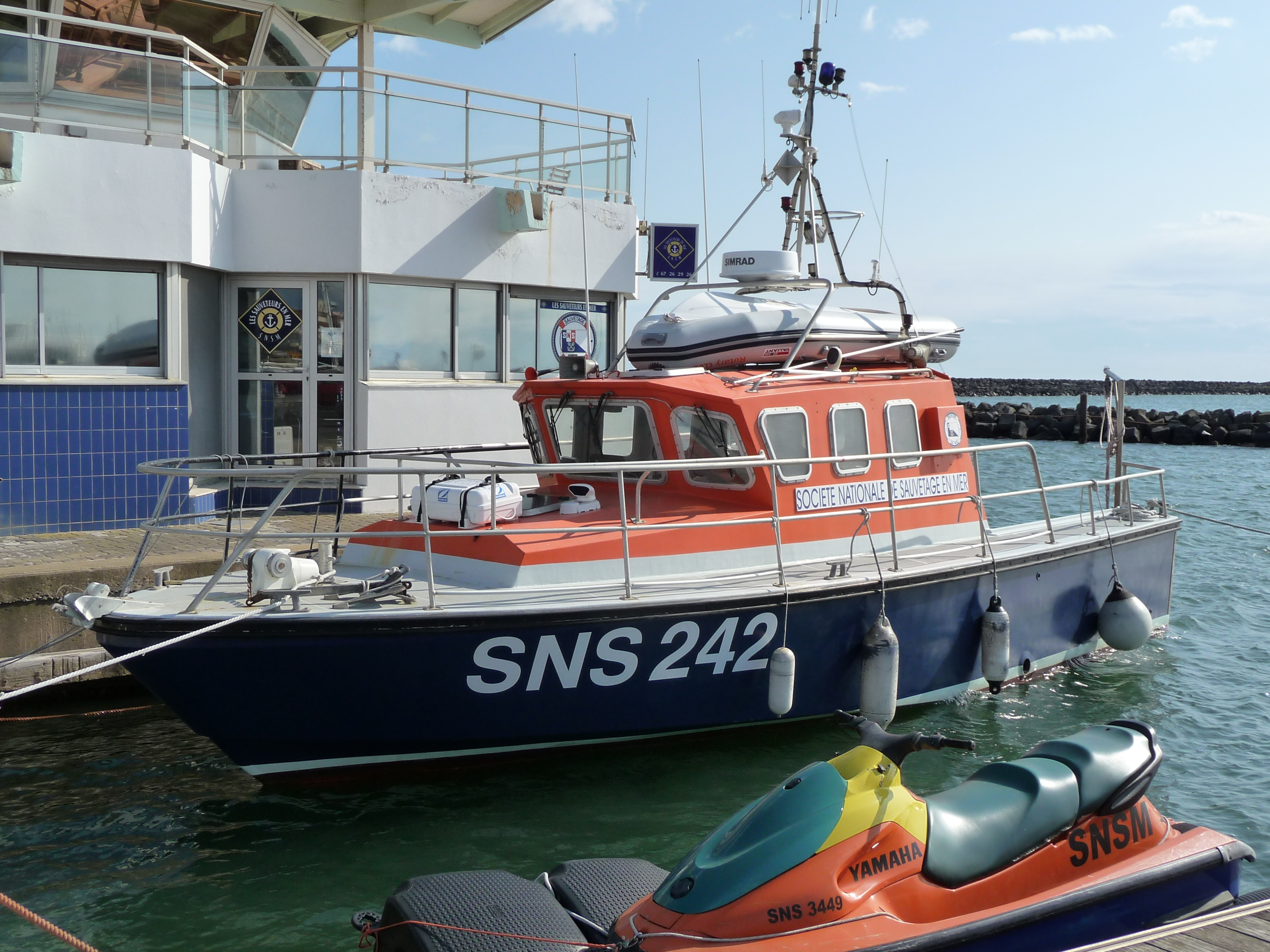
Lifeguard boats, quay of Harbourmaster office

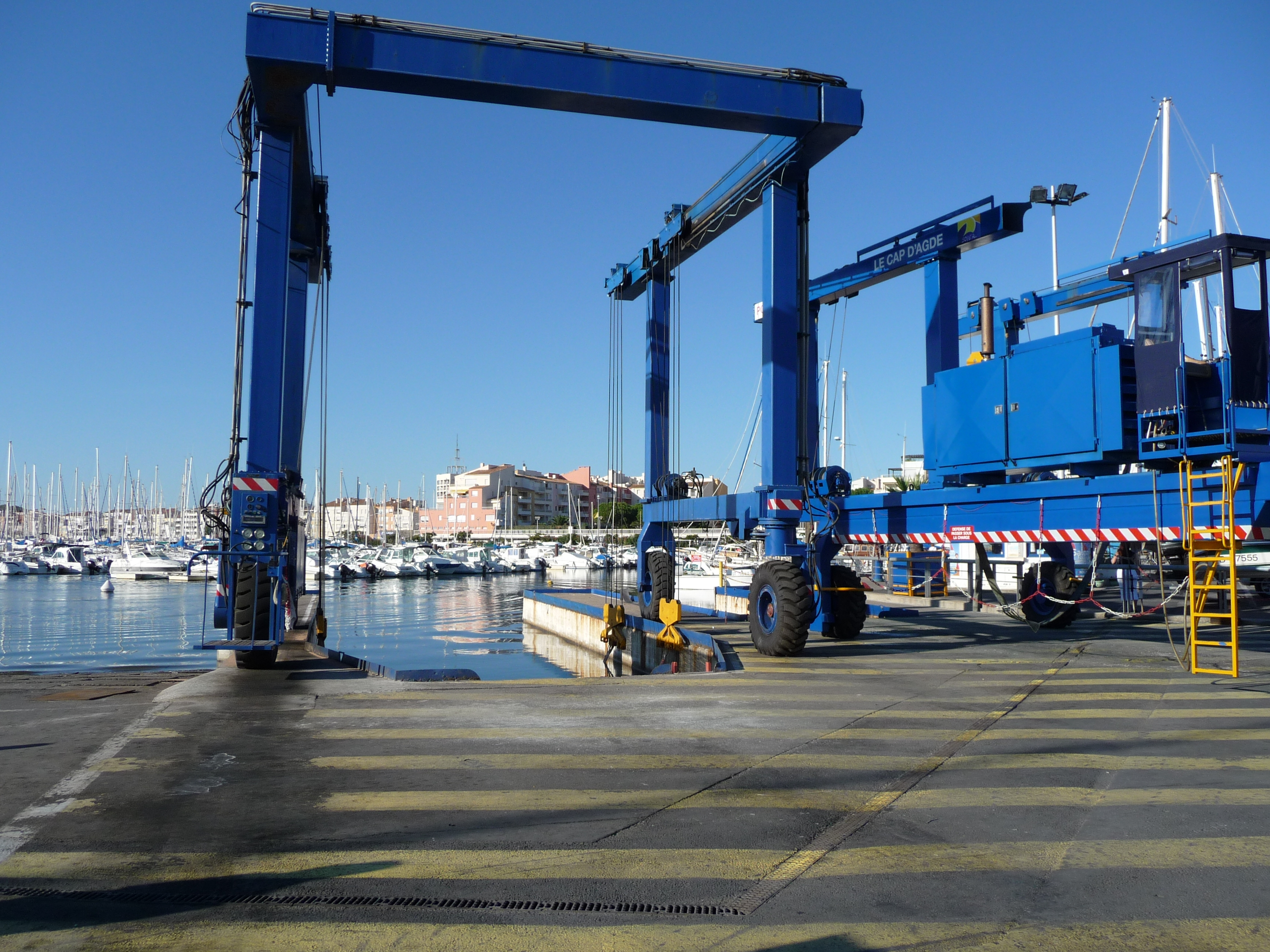
Lift for boats on the dry dock Avant-Port

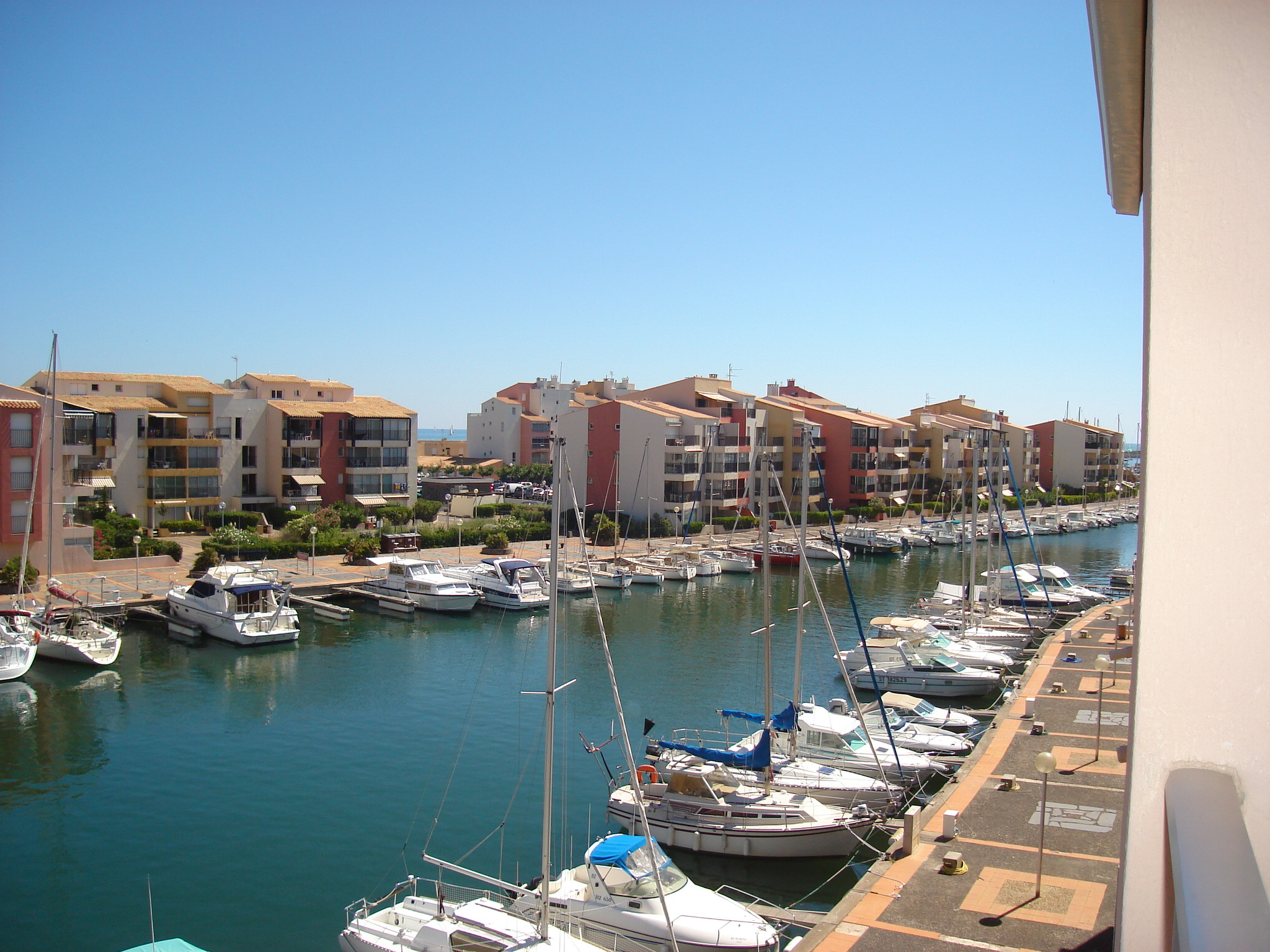
Blocks of buildings on Ile des Pêcheurs, underground garages

The Port of Cap d'Agde (main marina) was excavated following the Mission Racine in the old salt marsh, the Luno lagoon.

The marina is delimited by the buildings that border it, each one with 100 apartments and around those the housing estates of 200 villas, and in the 2 cases hotels added.

The marina has a single entrance, due to the south–north marine currents that silt it up. It is made up of two distinct parts, built around accessible and non-accessible islands. The part between accessible Ile des Loisirs and non-accessible Ile St Martin is the part of the harbor where the boat's mooring ring to the quay is private and sold with the villa or apartment. The part between Ile St Martin and accessible Ile des Pêcheurs is the part of the harbor where the boat's mooring ring is rented to the harbor master.

There's also a second marina, Port Ambonne, a remnant of the dried-up eastern arm of the Hérault delta, known as Port Lano (old name Lano pound). This is a port for the naturist camp. It is close to a heliport for safety operations at sea. Les Berges de l'Hérault are the historic riverbanks of the Hérault.

Overall the car must be available for yachtsmen, and some of the places to live are built with an underground garage.

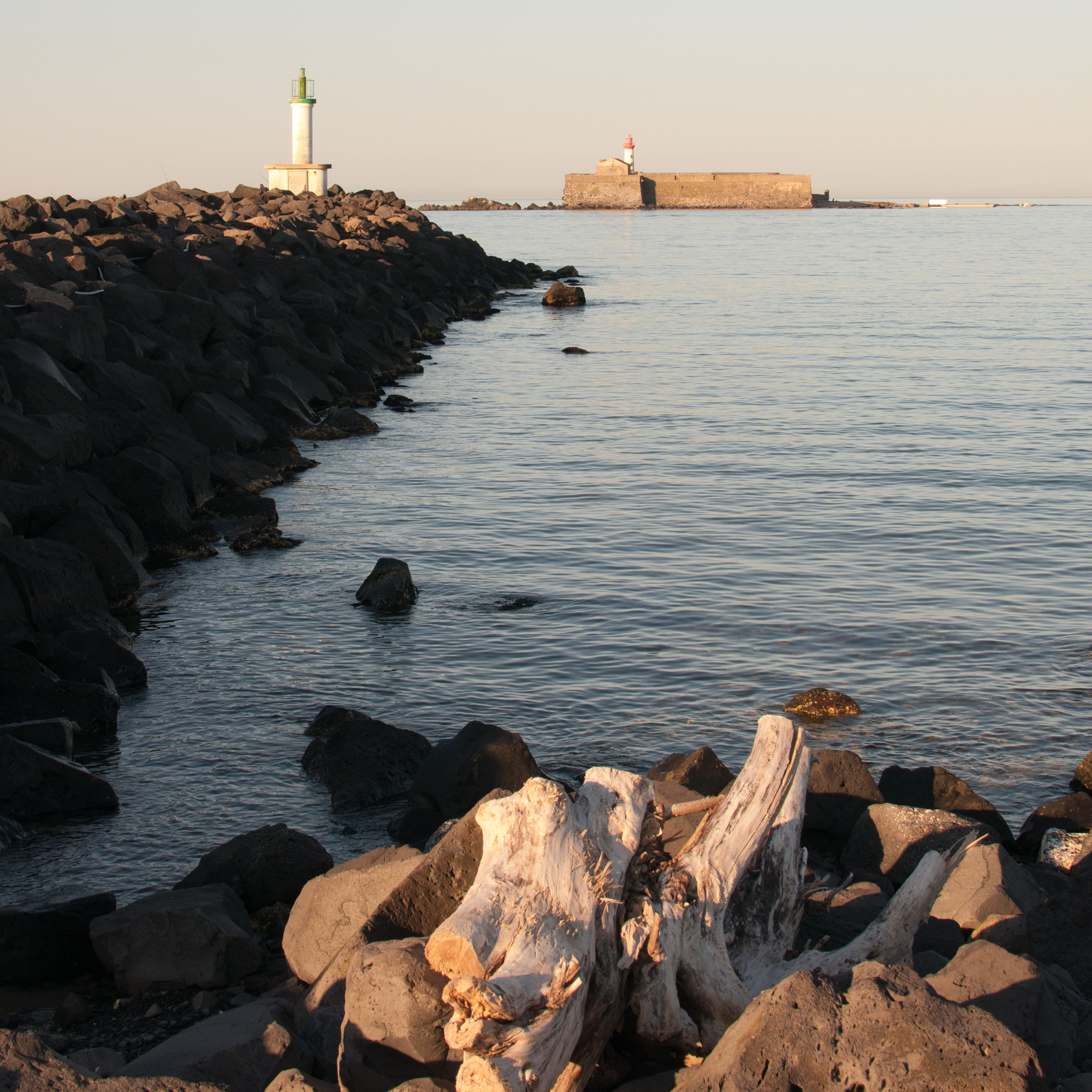
Fort de Brescou and lighthouse at the end of the pier

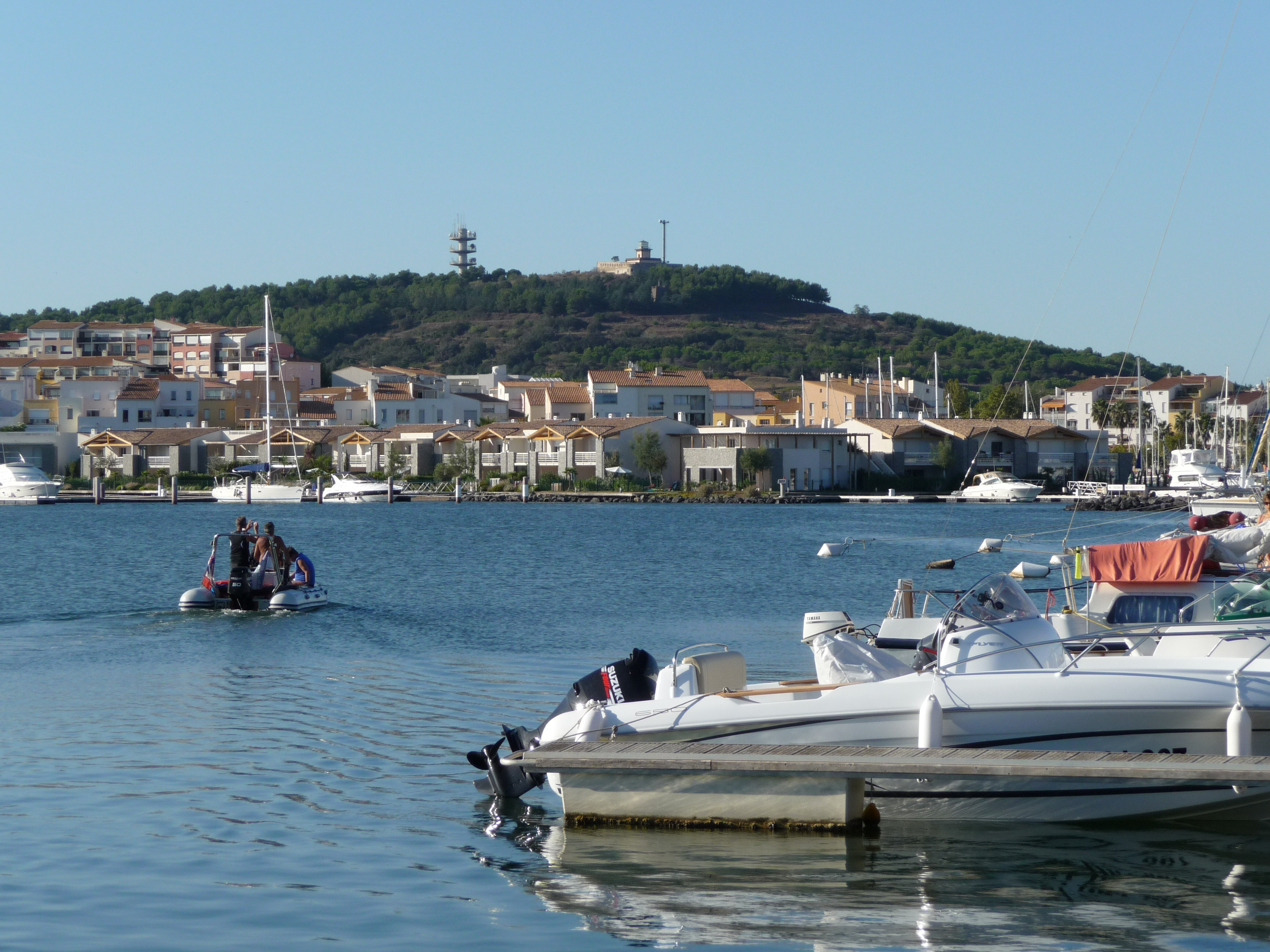
Houses on Ile St-Martin below buildings on Mont St-Martin and the green Mont St-Loup on the right

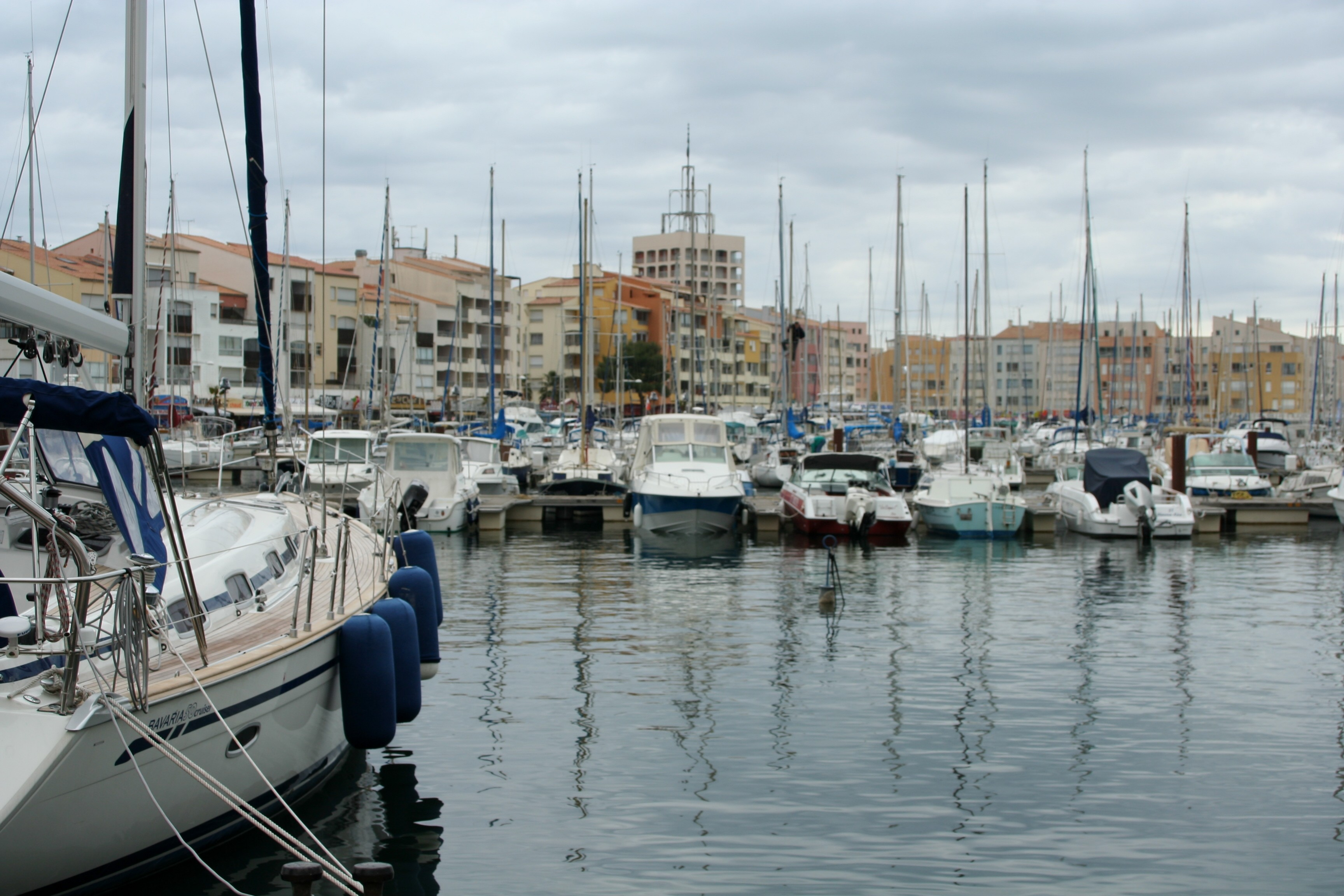
Main landmark in the marina : the campanile of the former Cap center 1970

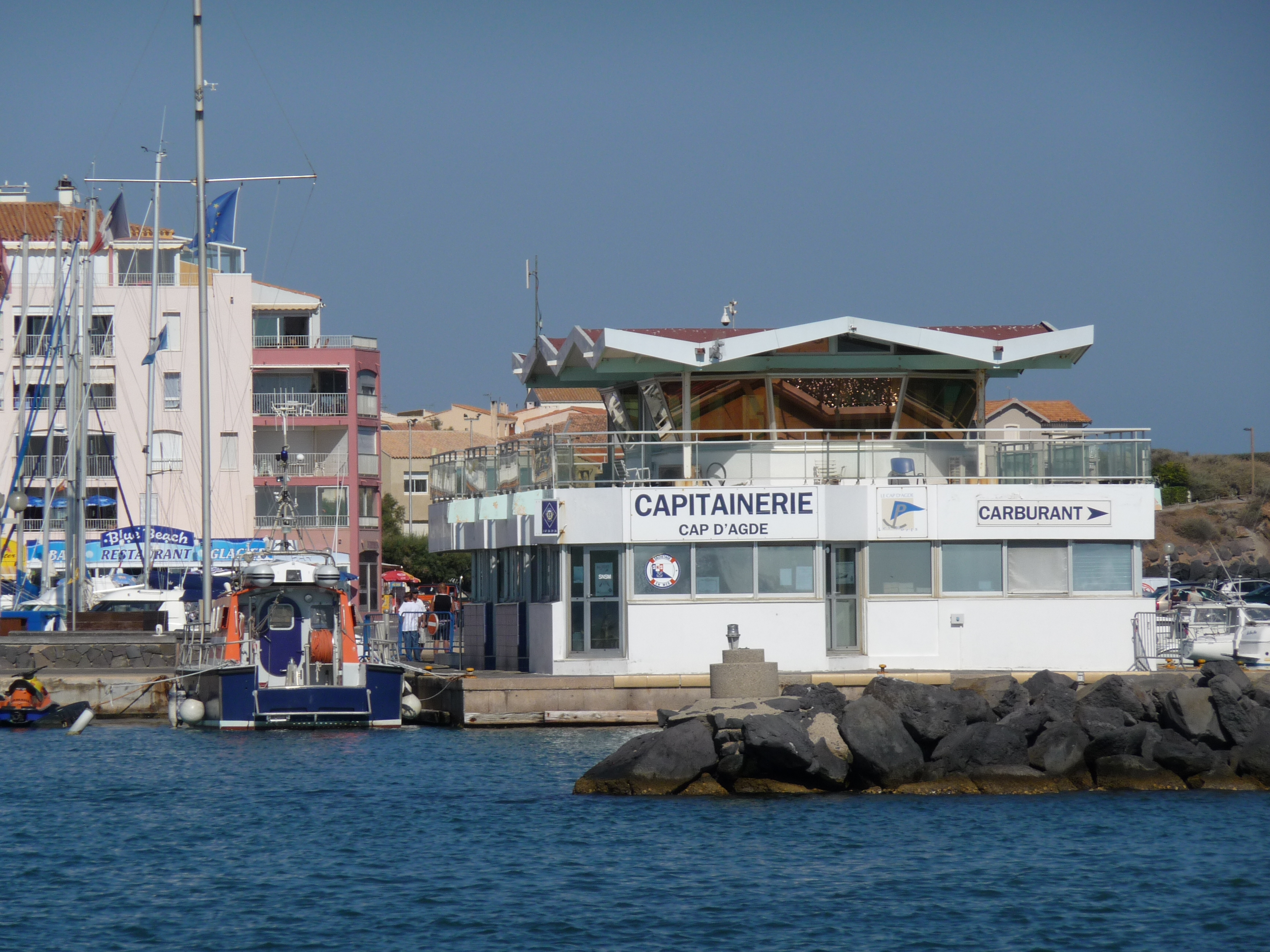
Harbormaster office (Avant-Port)

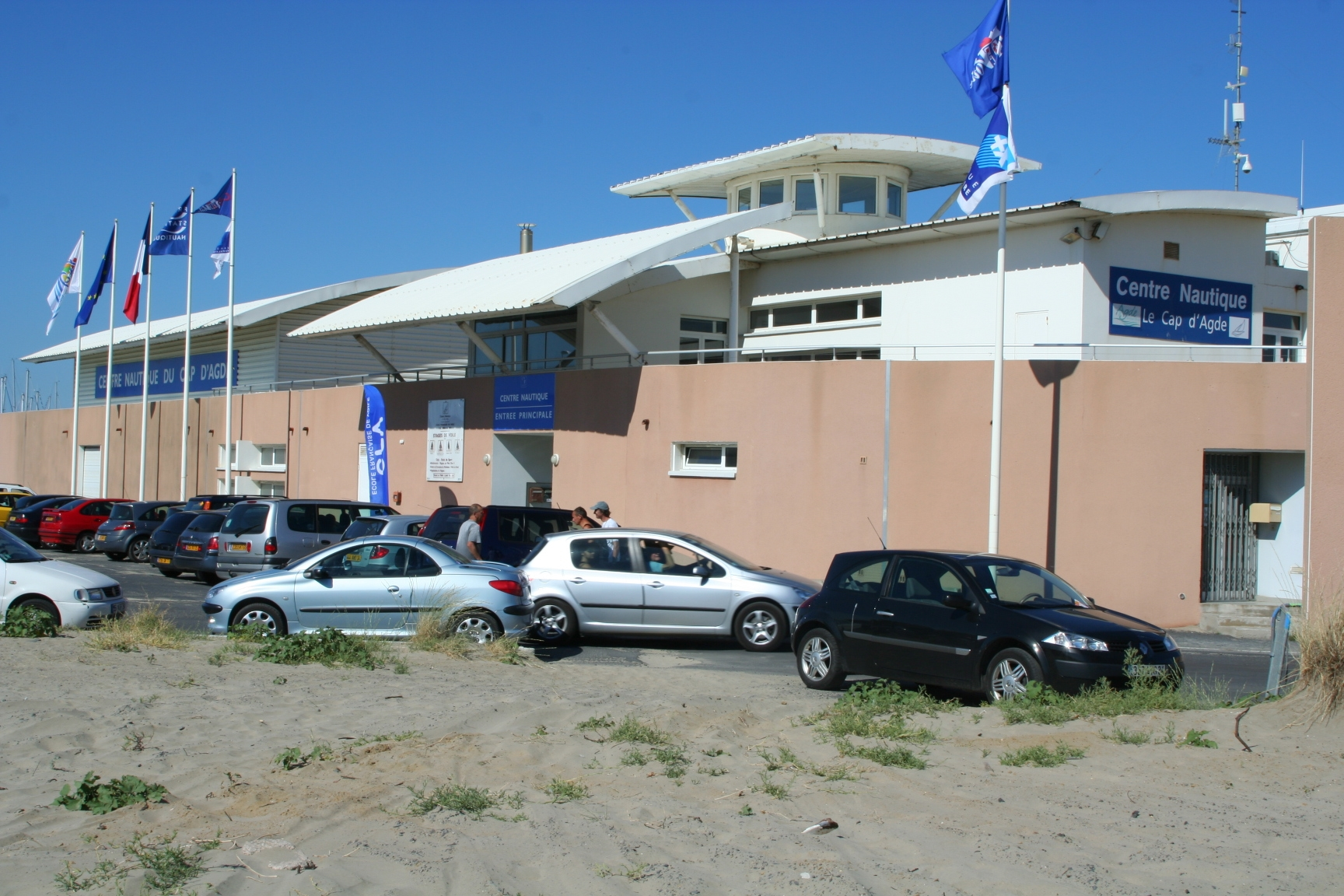
Nautical center ending Richelieu beach side

== Naturist complex ==
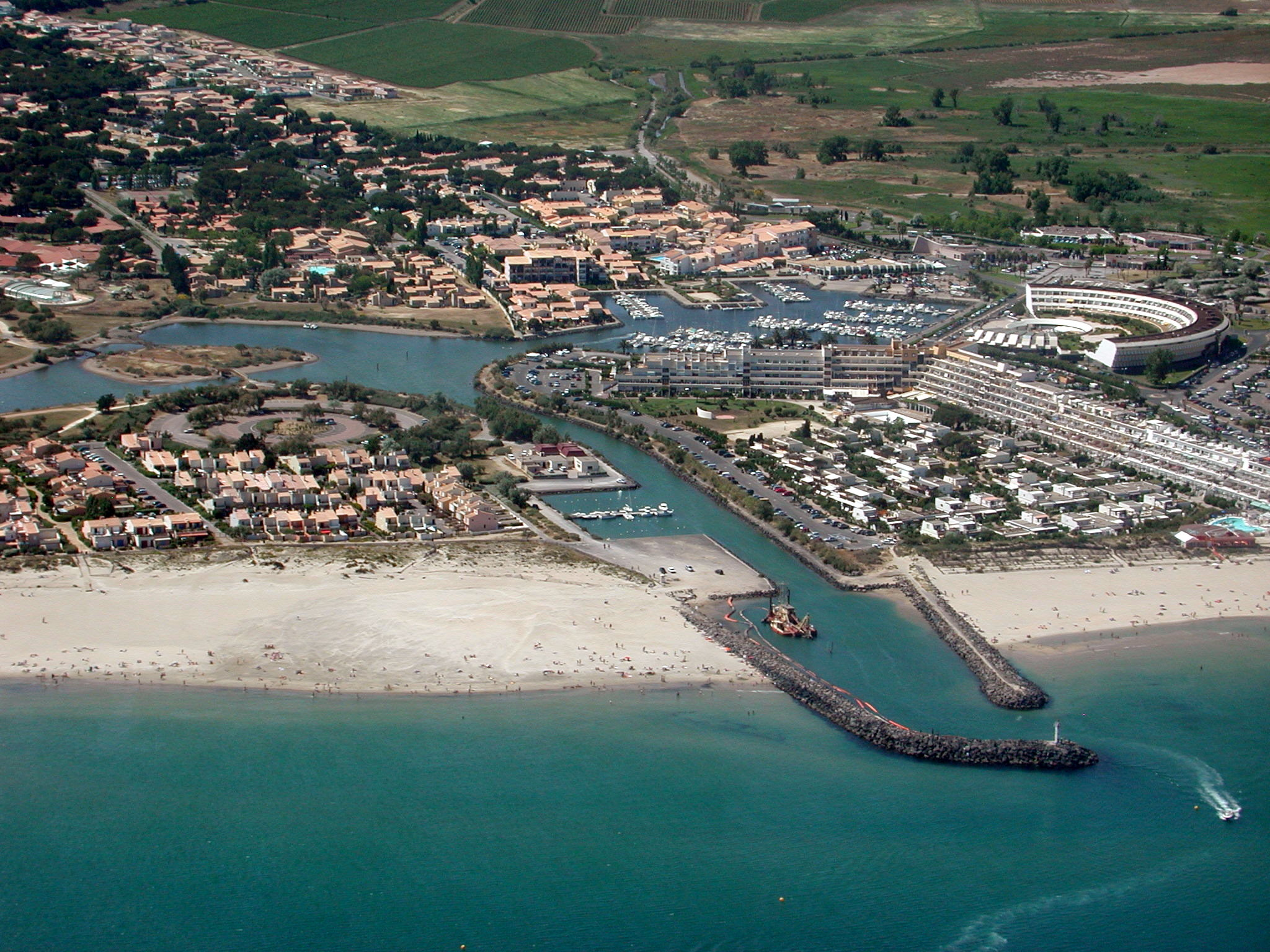
Marina Ambonne and naturist complex buildings (right)

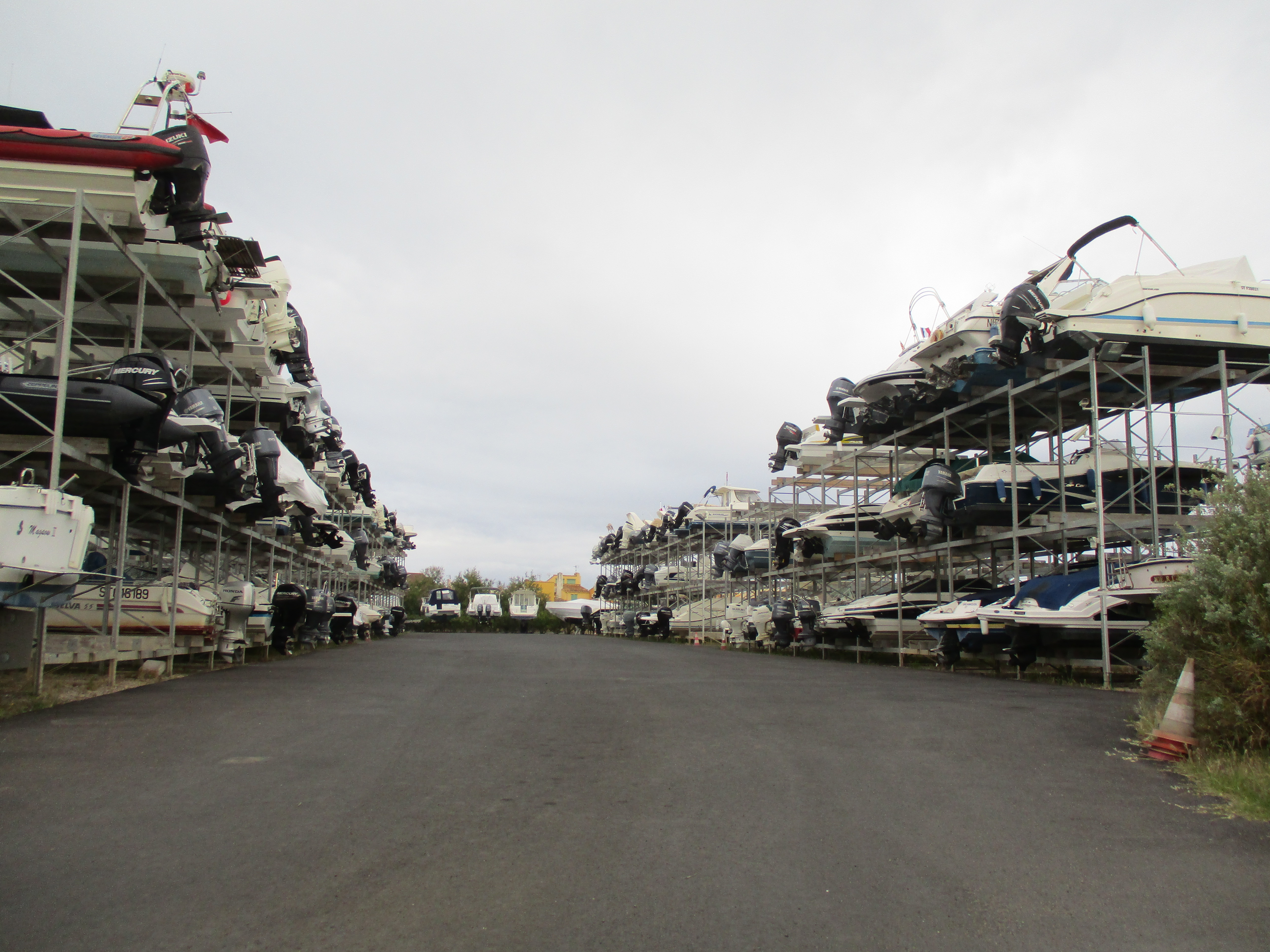
Marina Ambonne, an in-racks dry port in Port Lano, naturist complex on the north side

After the creation of a camping in the farm for nudists receiving Belgian, German and Dutch families, the beach was officially designated as a naturist beach in 1973. The first development was the construction of apartments, stores and swimming pools in a paid-entry area. These massive concrete buildings did not comply with town-planning regulations, and the huge buildings have global form O and Y. Nudity was legal on the beach. A small commercial area was built before the entrance, the one that makes the camp self-sufficient after it, and housing estates grew up on the seafront, filling the land up to the vacation villages of 1975. This complex is aside Port Lano and its marina.

== Architecture ==
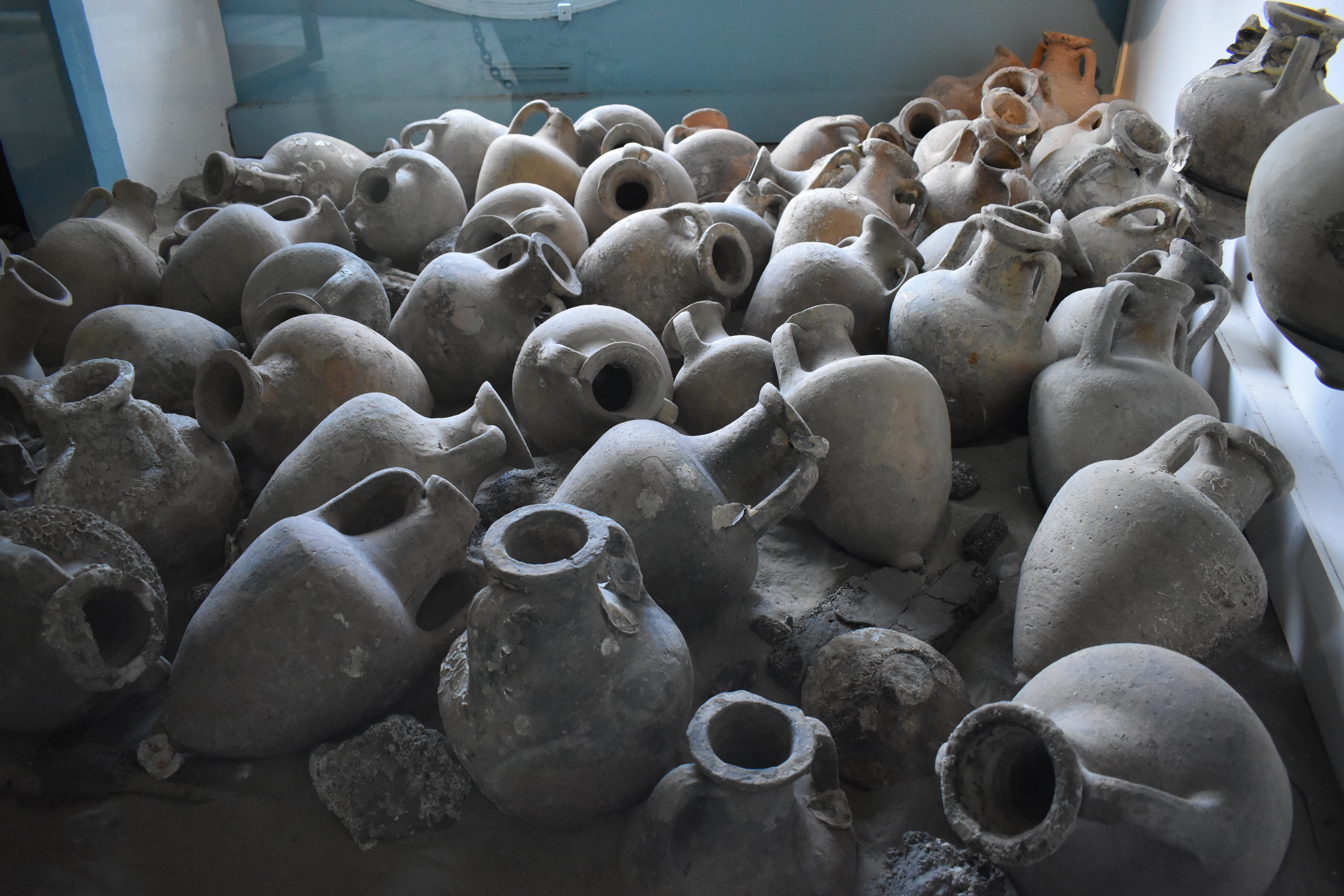
Amphora(s) at the Musée de l'Éphèbe (France, 6th c. BC - 2nd c. AD).

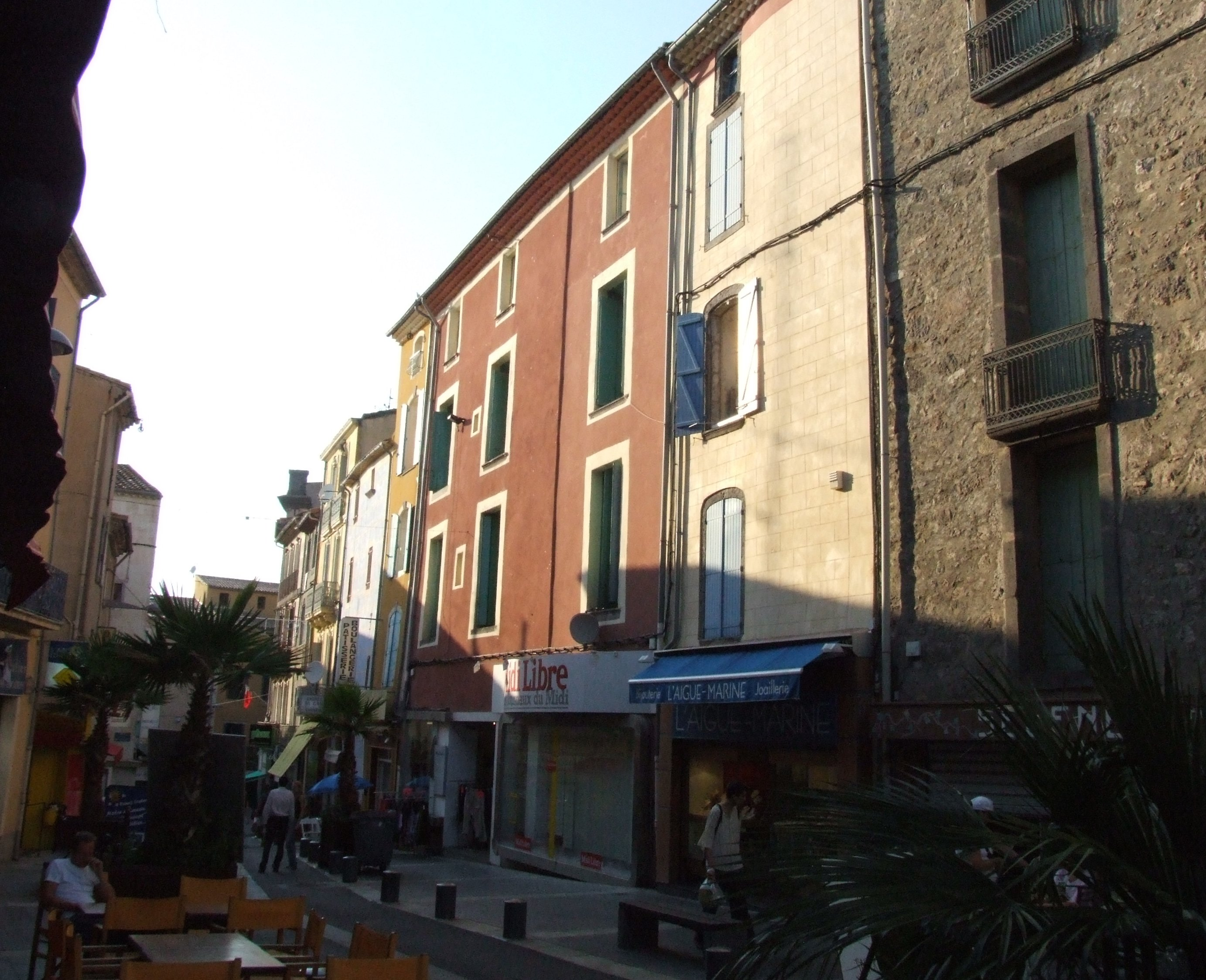
Town centre, pedestrian area

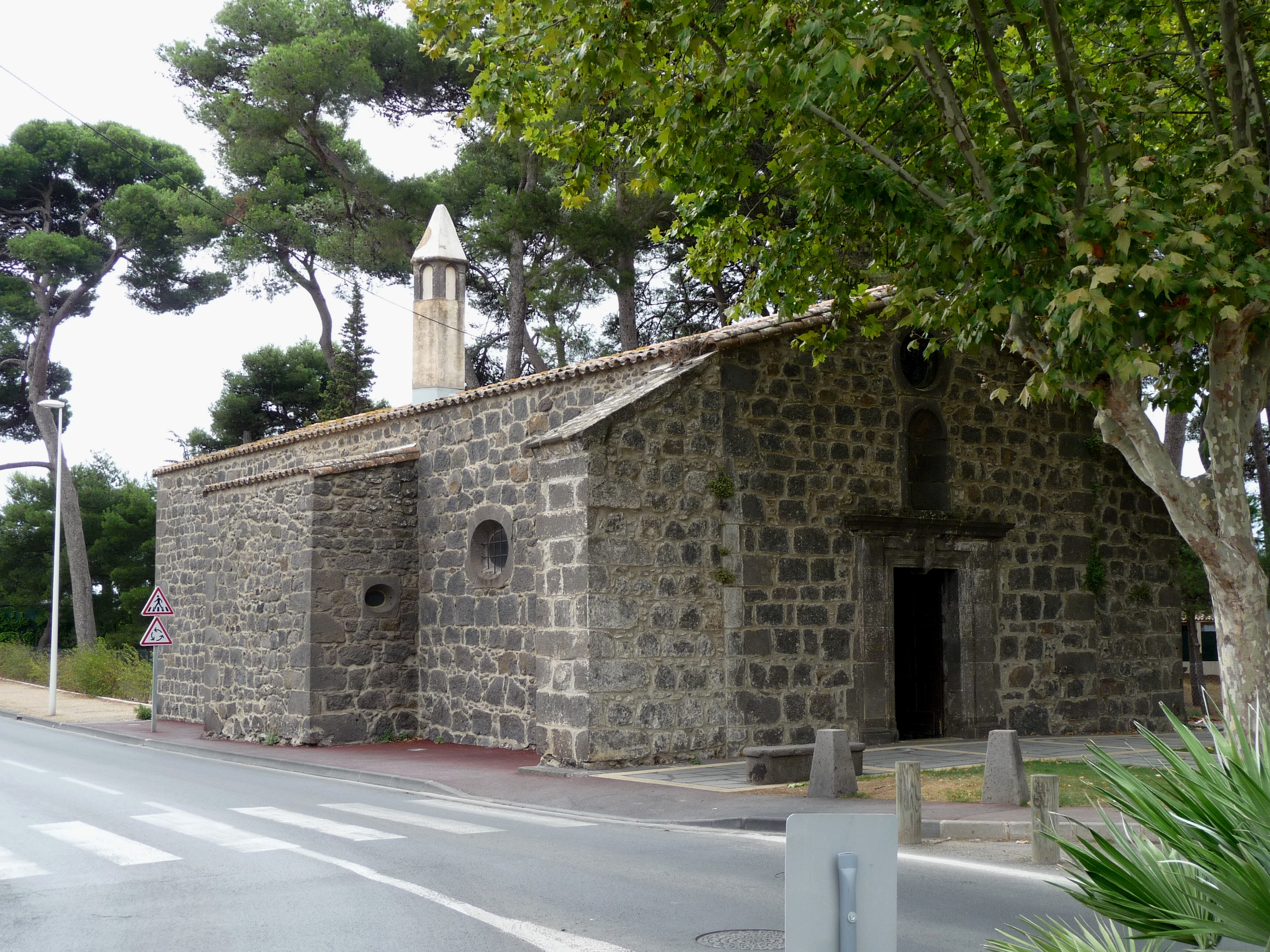
Genouillade chapel (16th century)

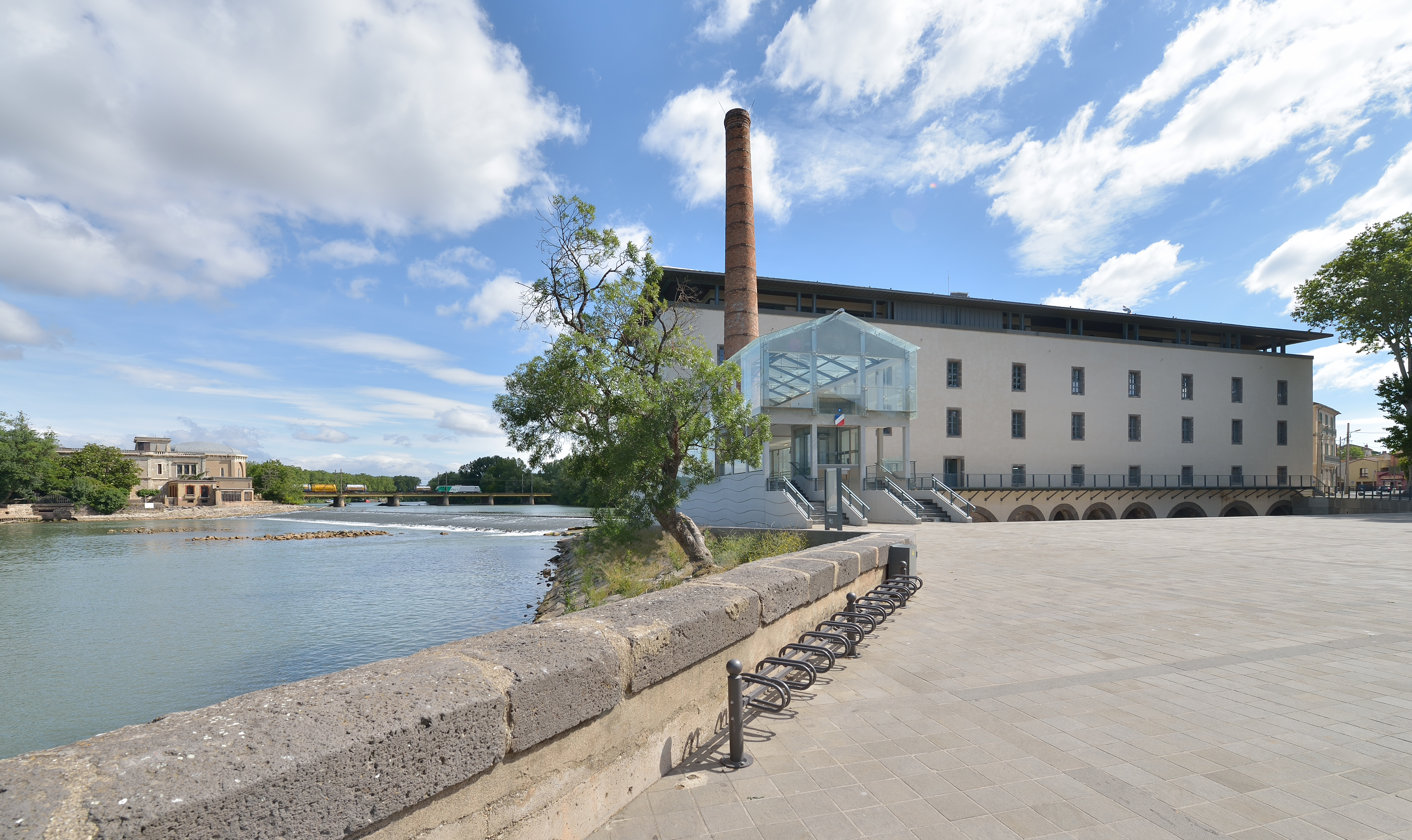
Bishops's mill, (basis 13th century-2010)

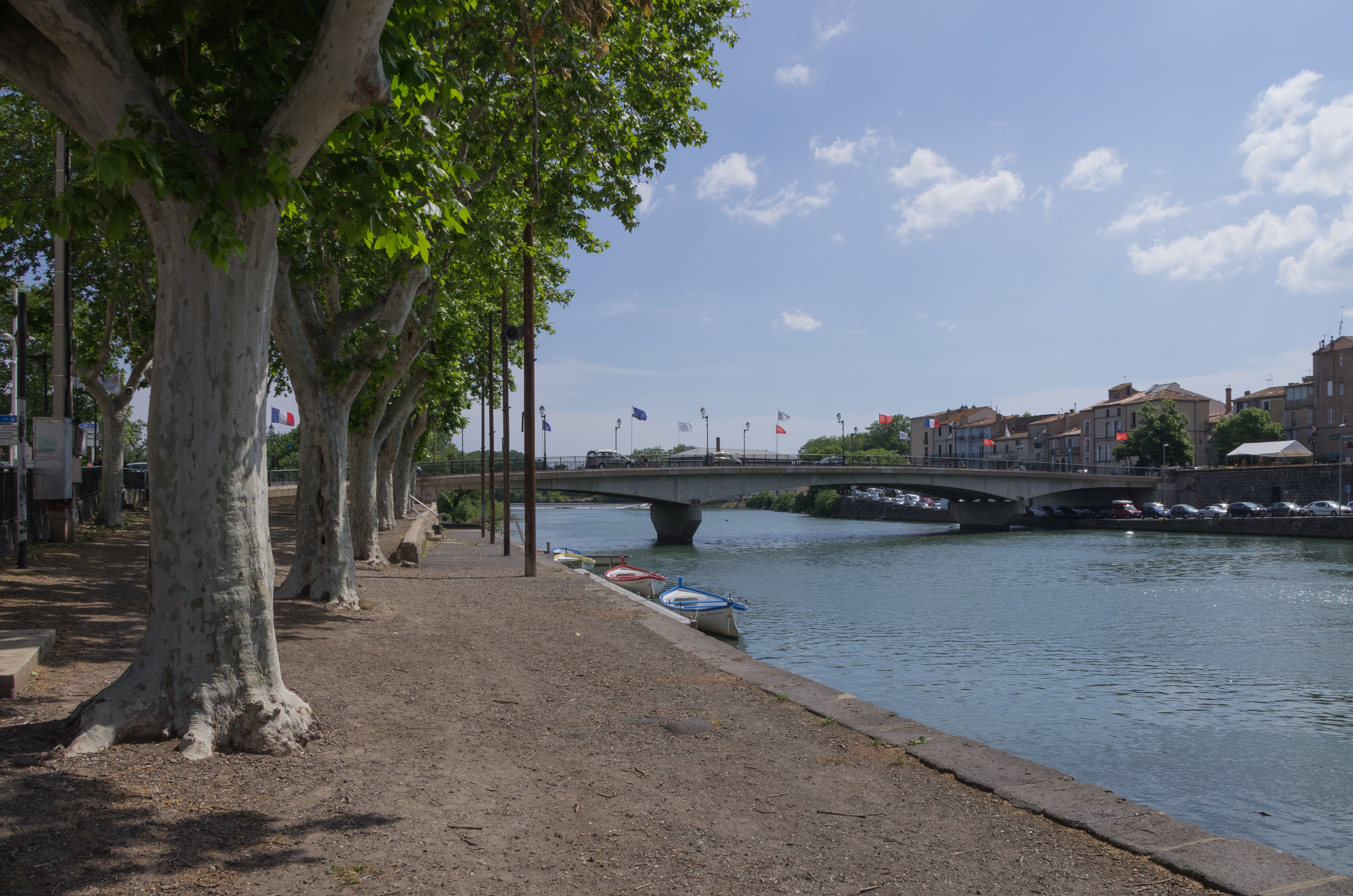
4 Maréchaux Bridge and the Hérault River, (1969)

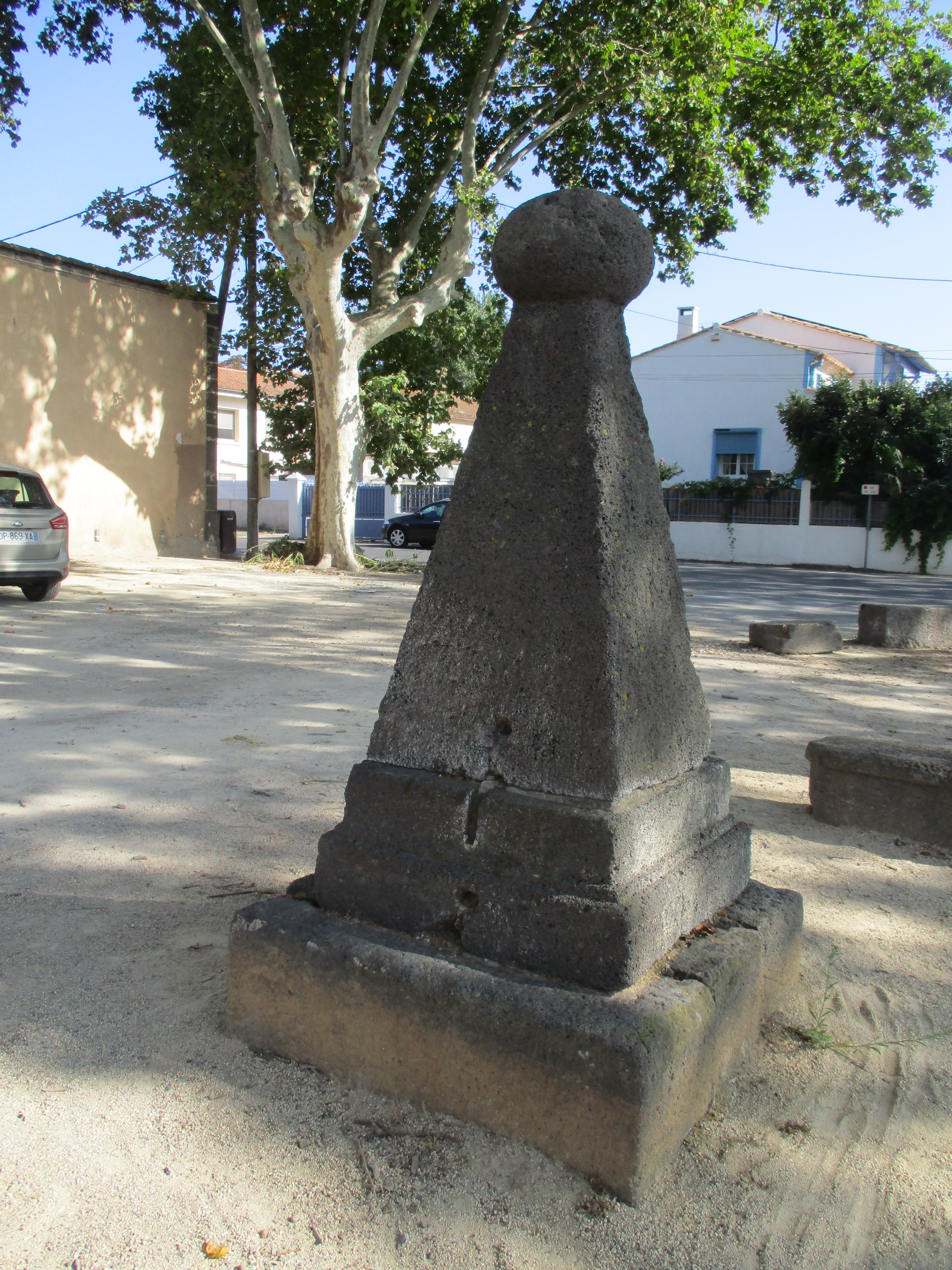
Pyramidal dock due milestone (19th century)

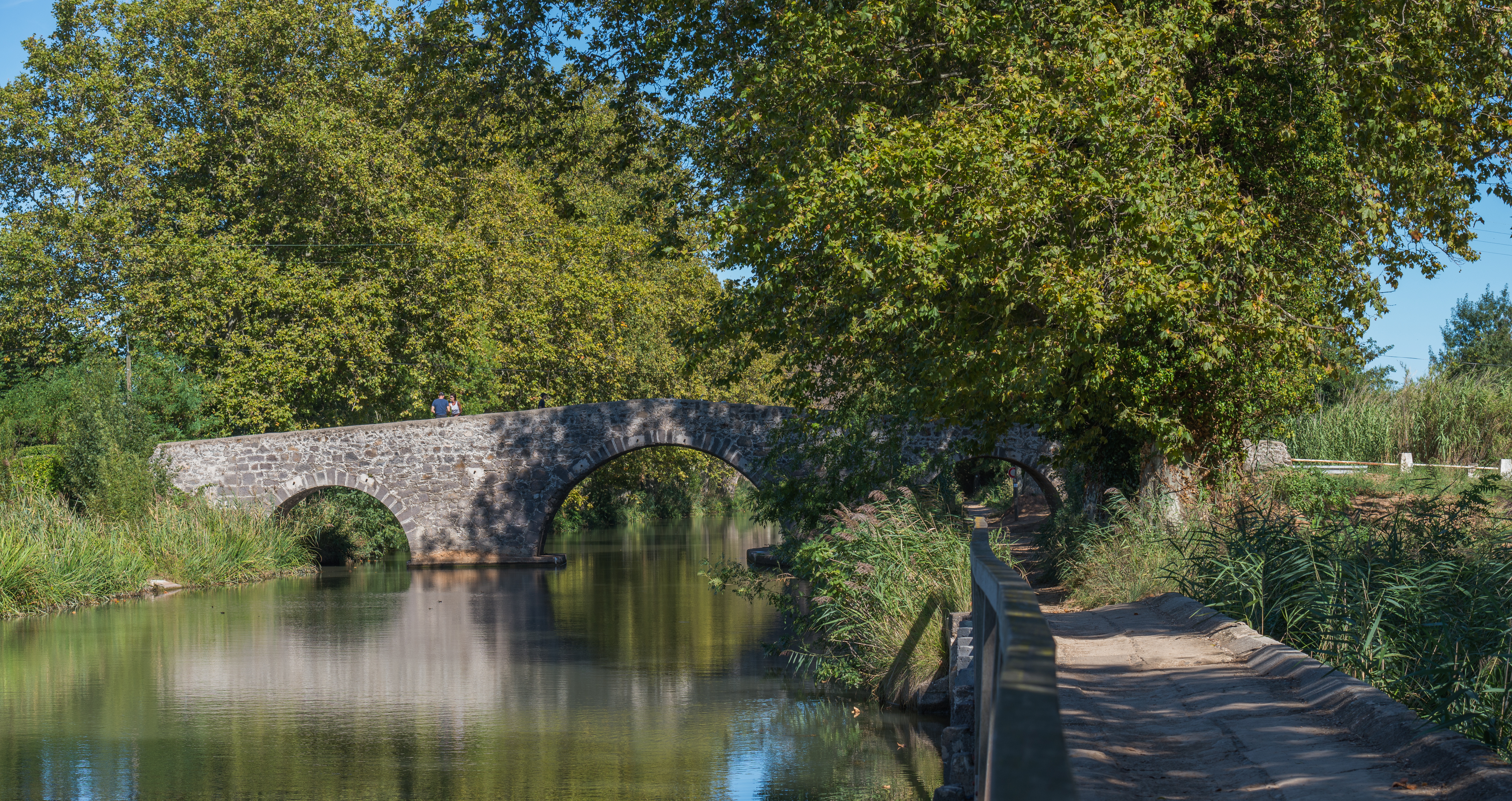
Saint-Joseph Bridge over the Canal du Midi

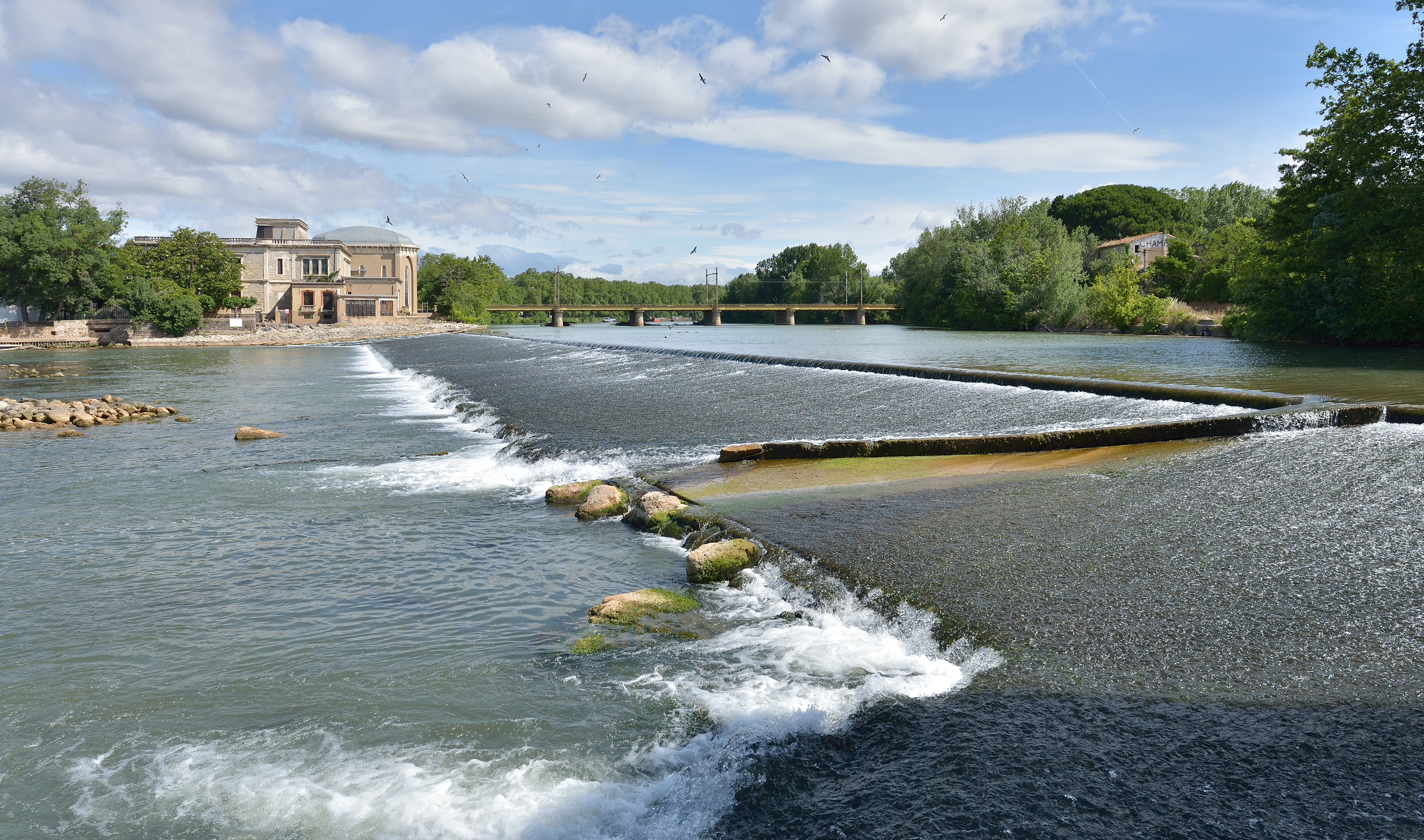
Château Laurens and the river Hérault, (basis 1898-2023)

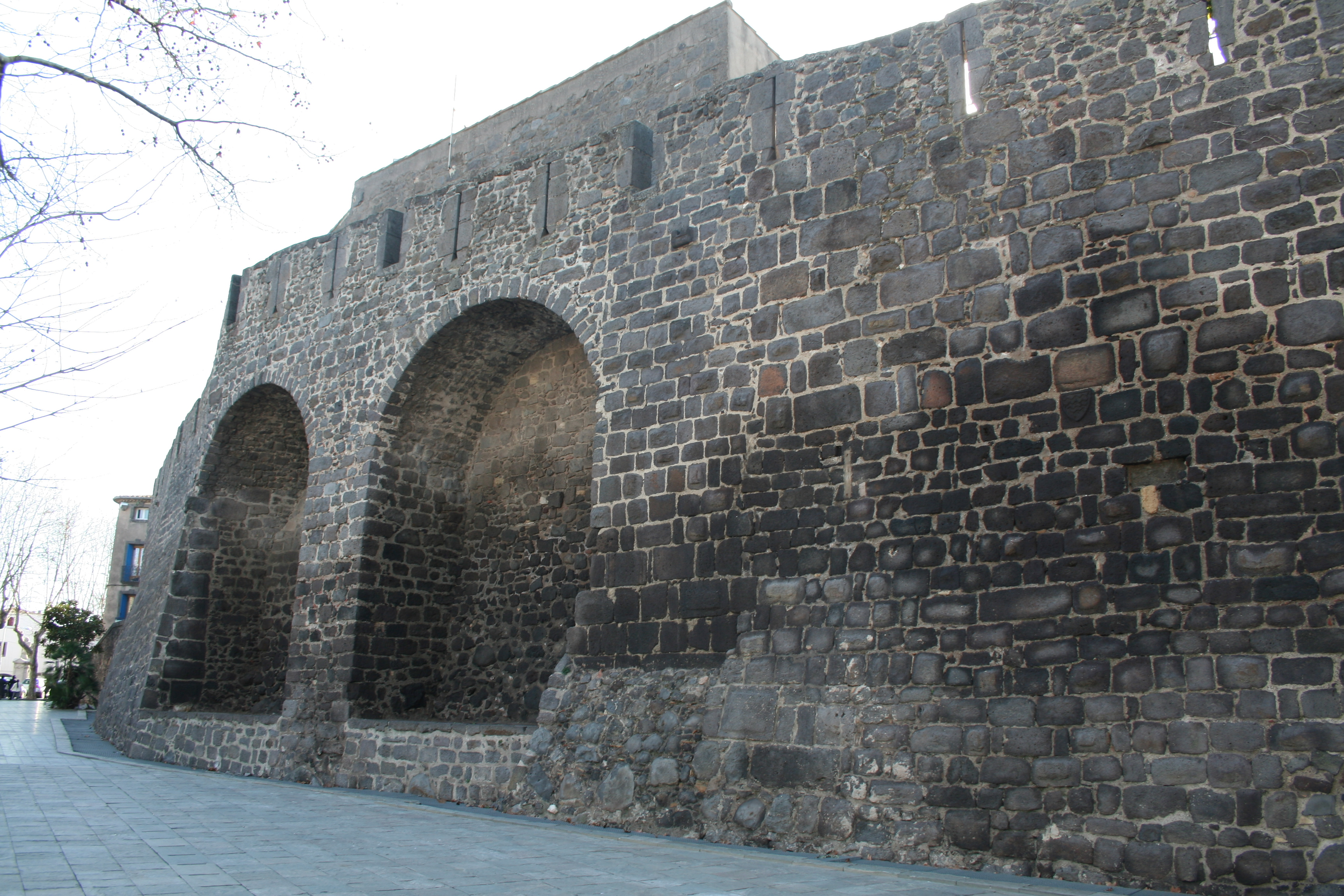
Battlements (basis 13th century)

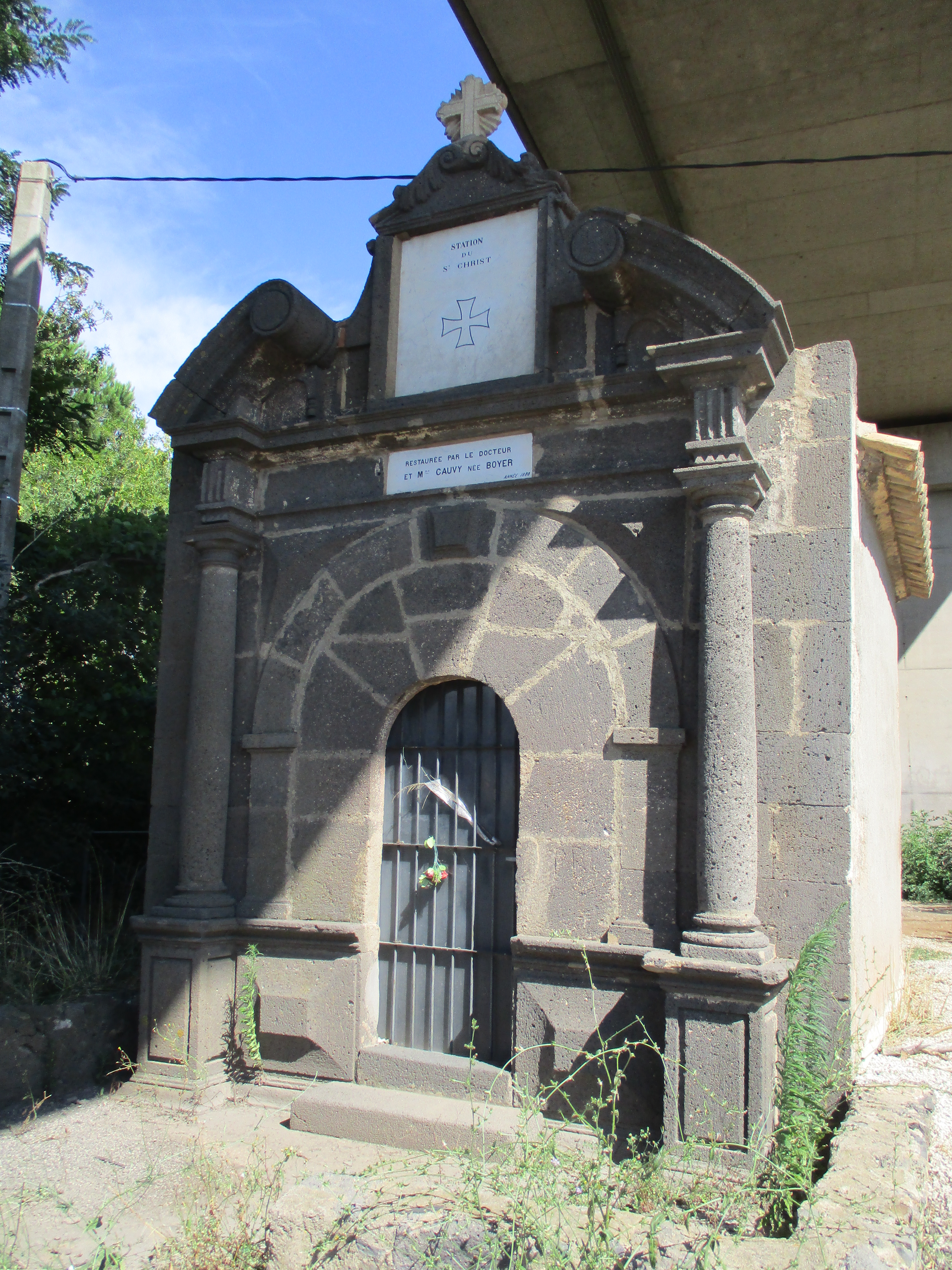
Agde way to Grau d'Agde: 10th the Chapel station of the way of the Cross (restaured 19th century) is exactly under the bridge behind the foot of the left bank bridge pier

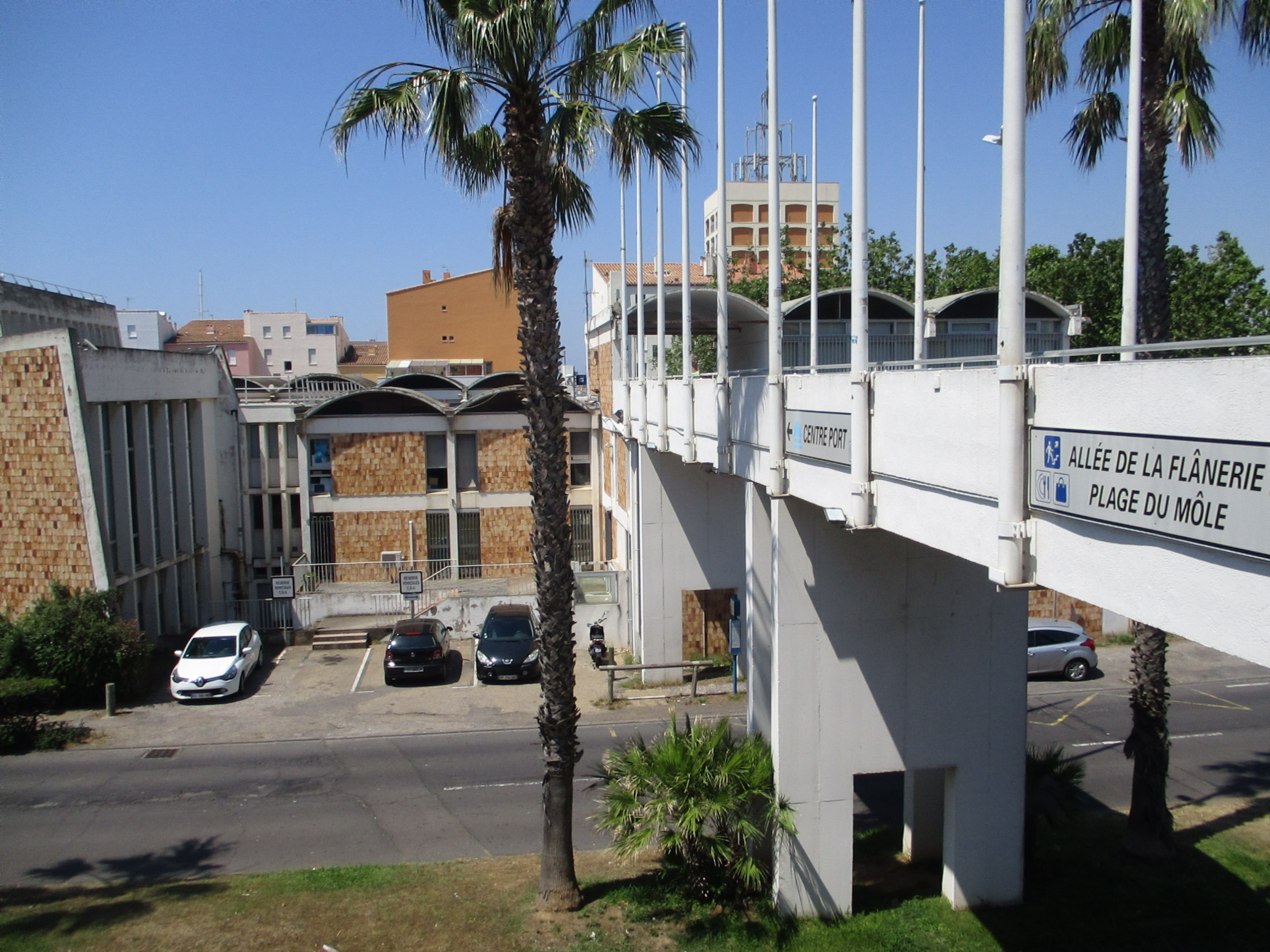
Cap d'Agde, footbridge from the Flanerie shopping mall to the Port, in the background the old city centre with annexes, (1970s)

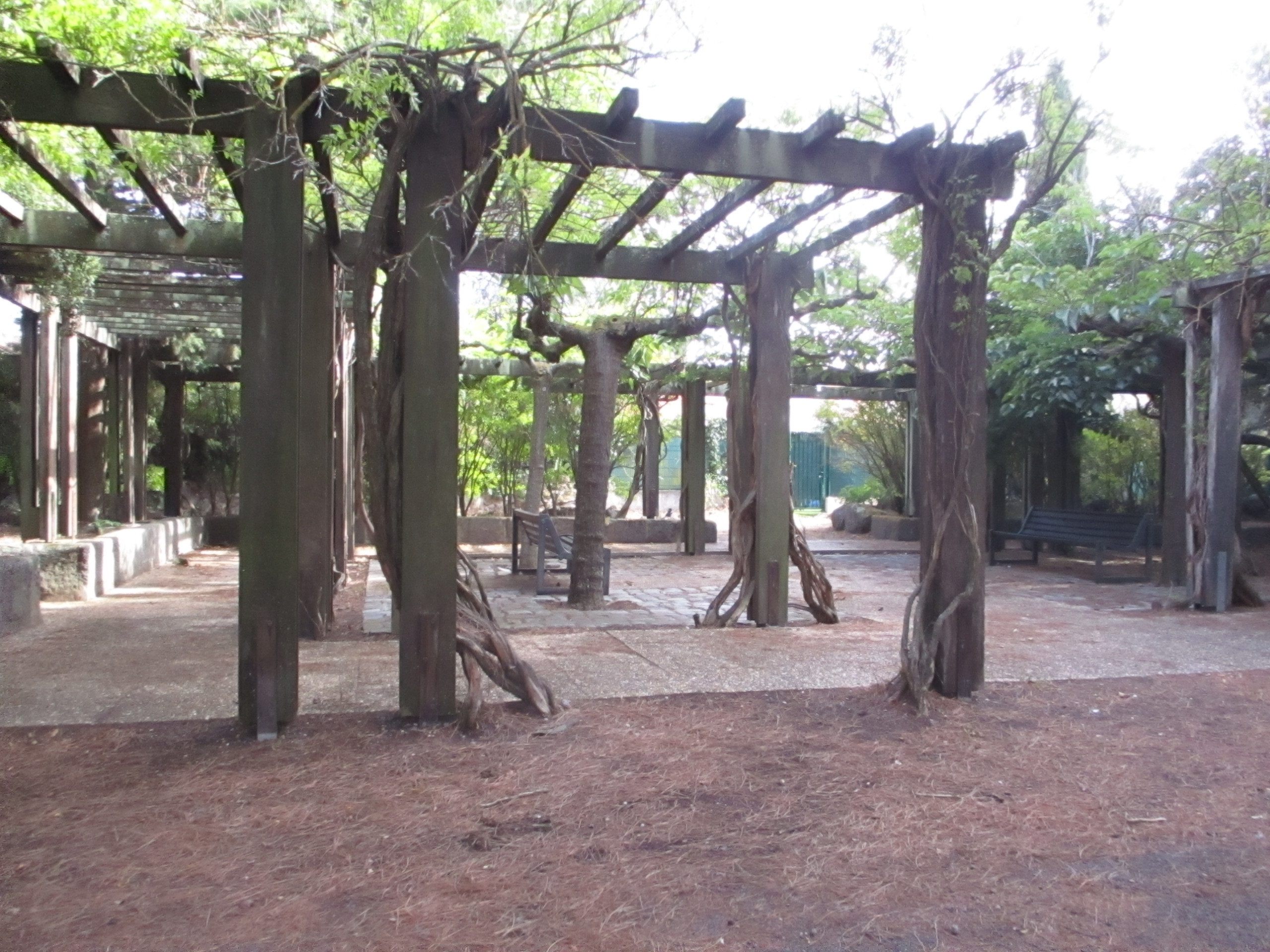
Pedestrian lane from La Clape (Museum) to La Roquille (beach), concrete tunnel support for flower trees "charmille Tony Garnier" style, (1970s)

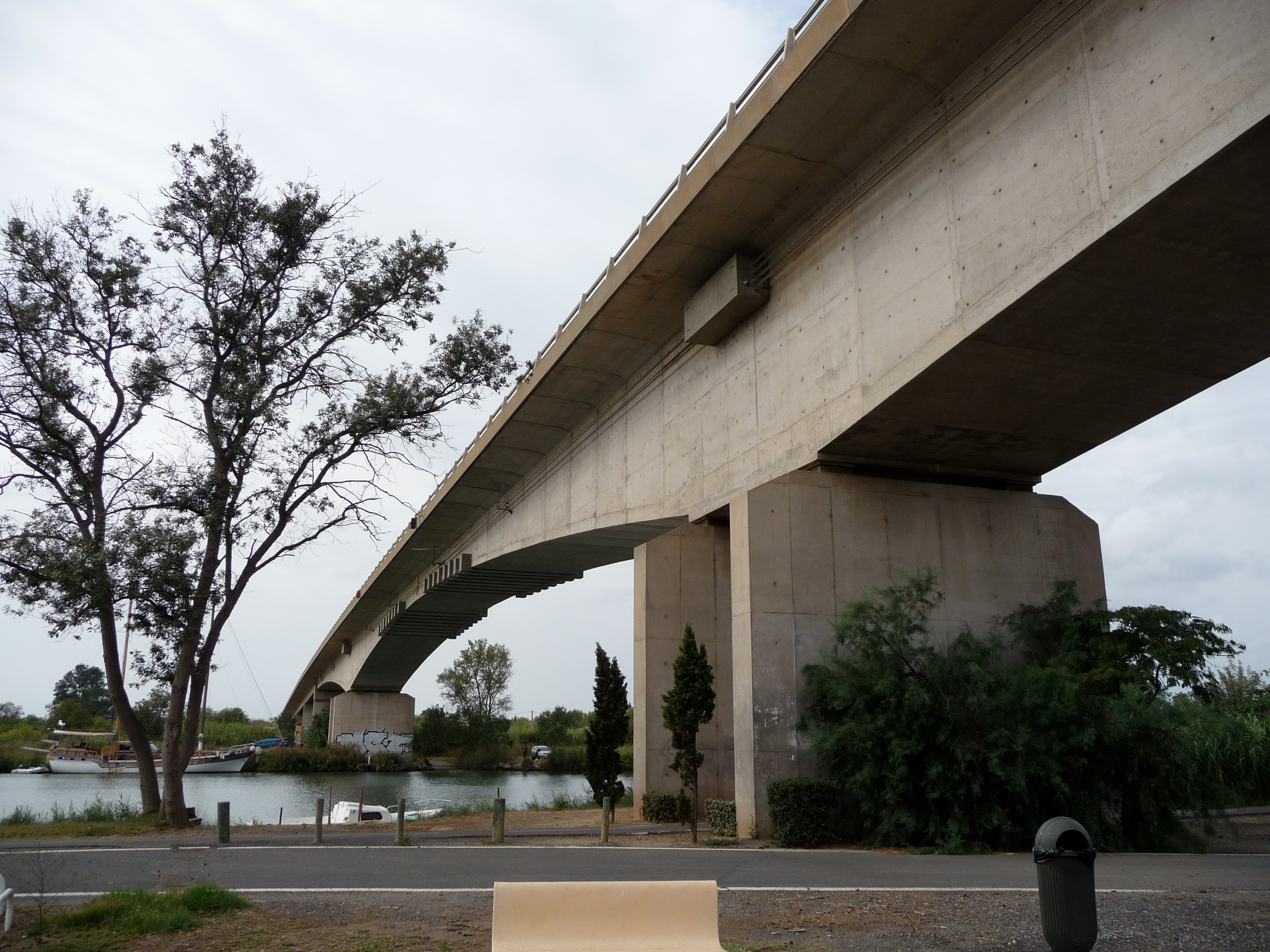
Concrete bridge over the Hérault route 612, (1976)

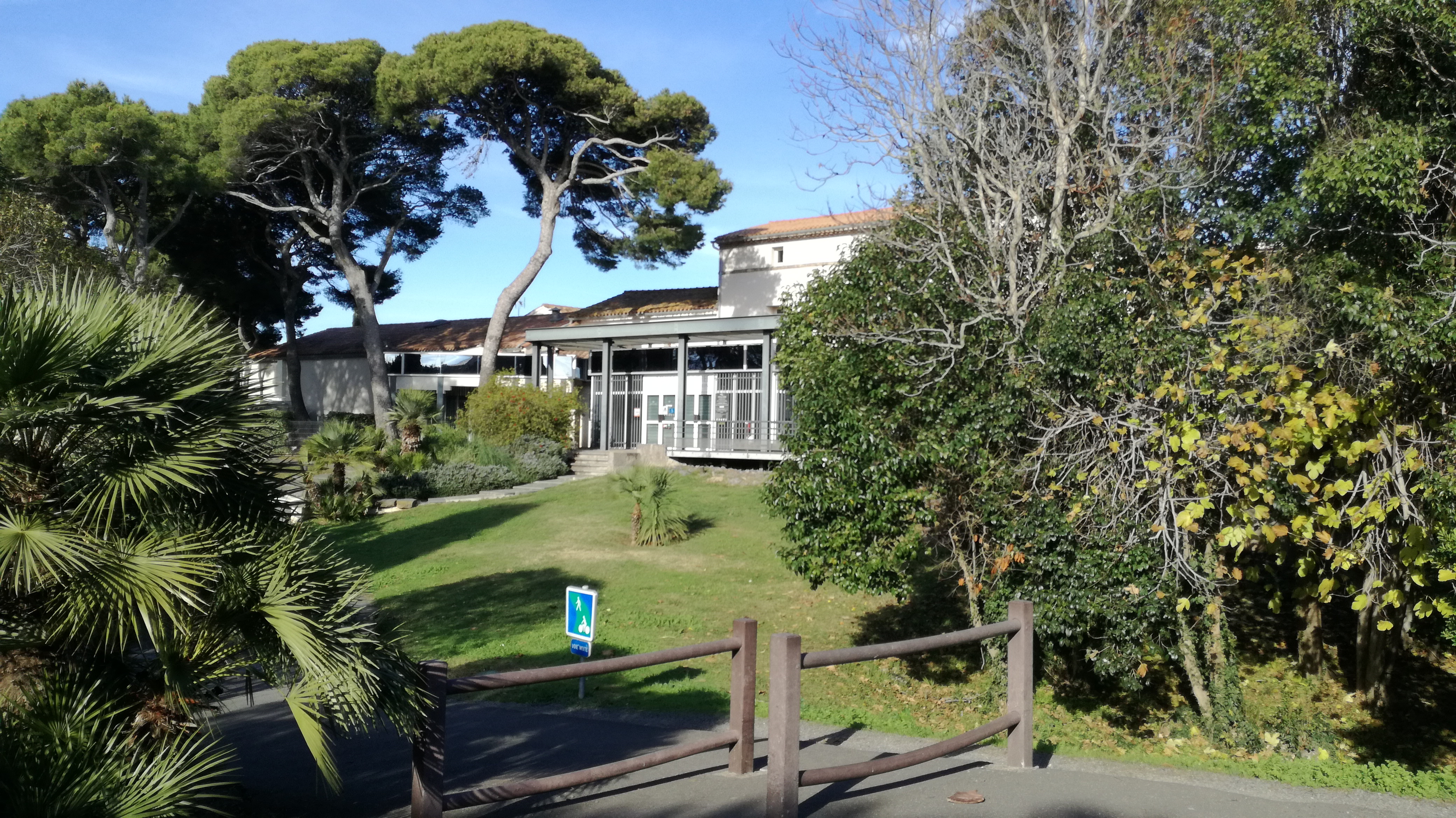
Ephebe Museum, (1987)

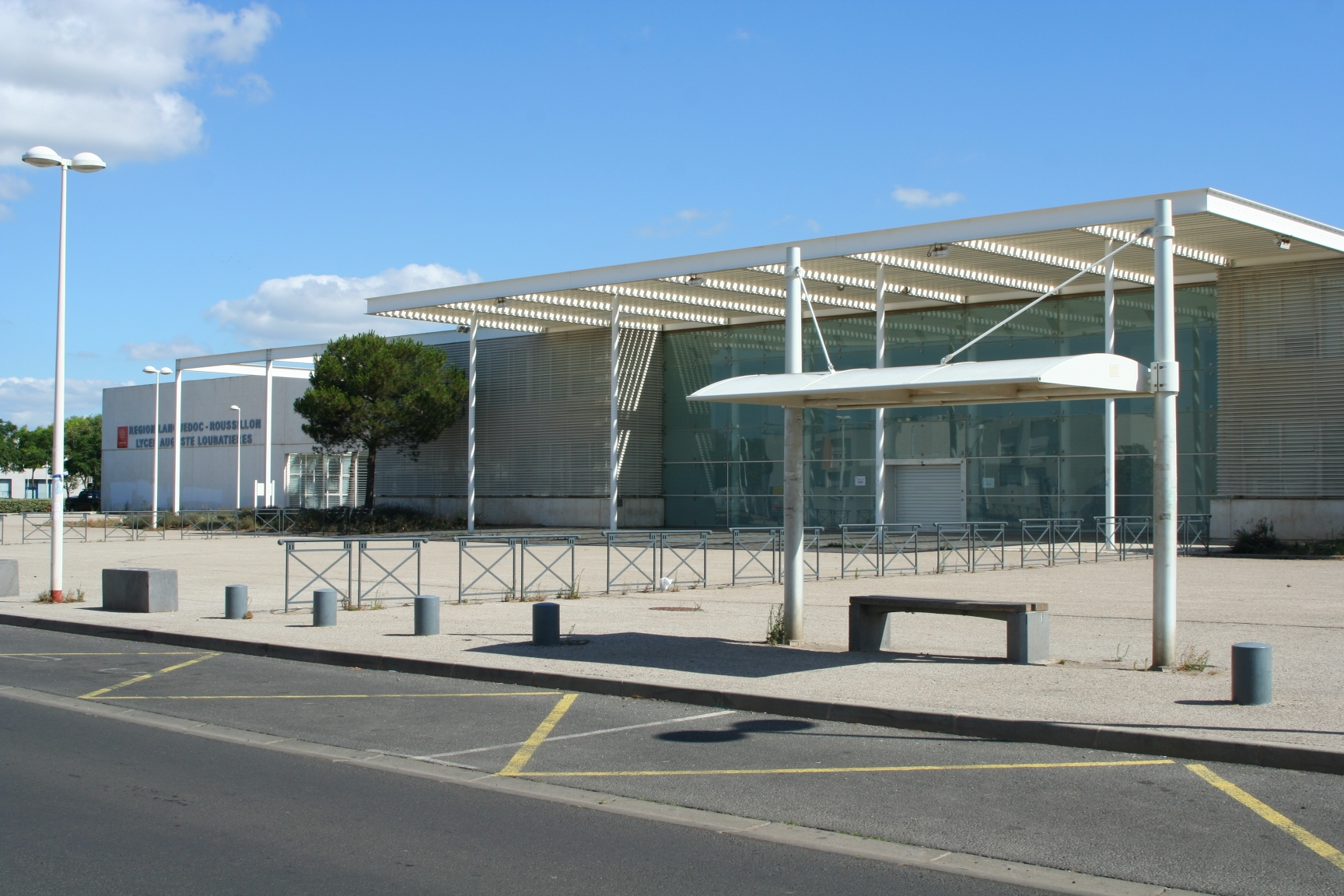
Agde - Auguste Loubatières highschool (1996)

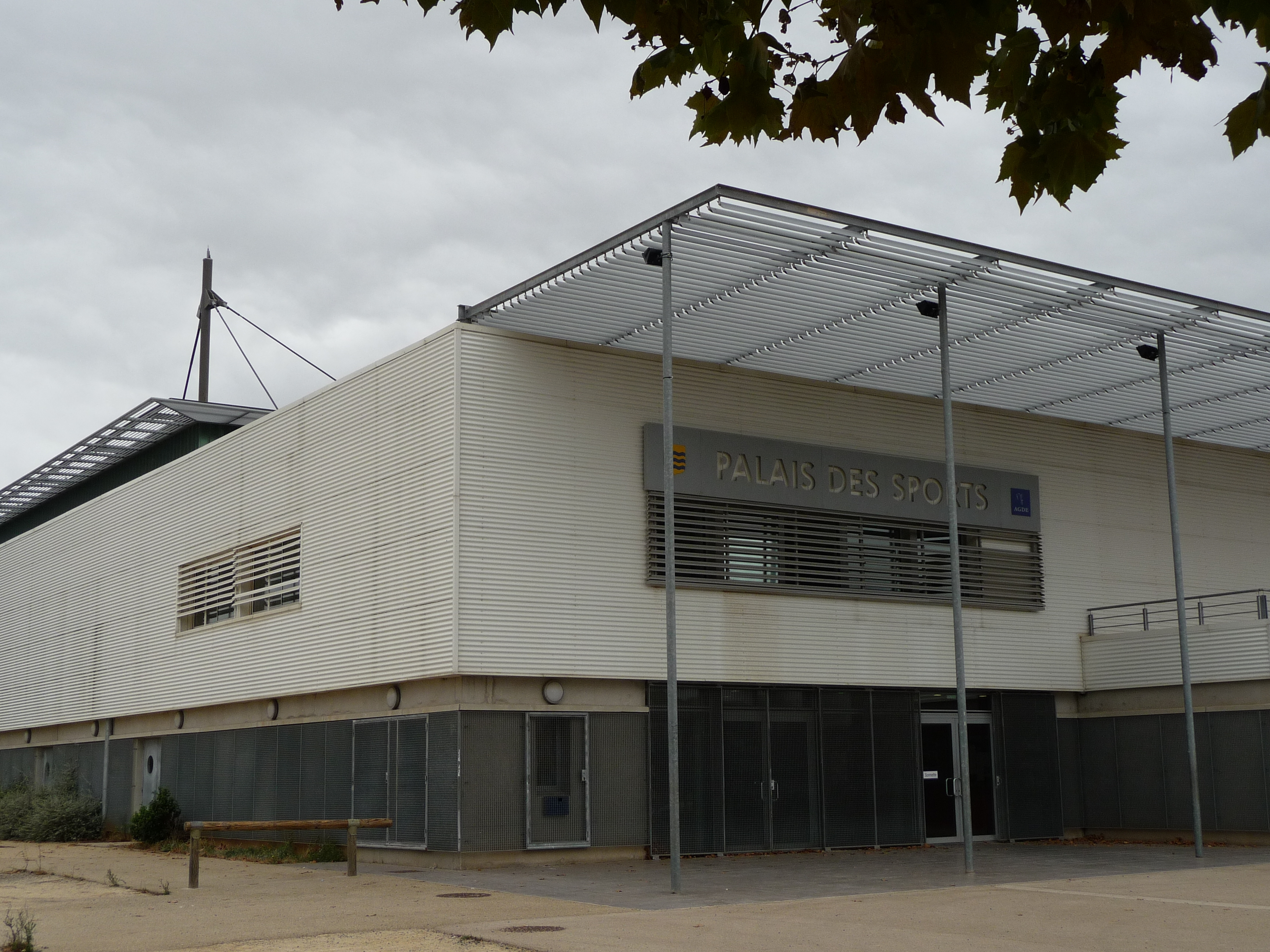
Agde Sport Palace (2001)

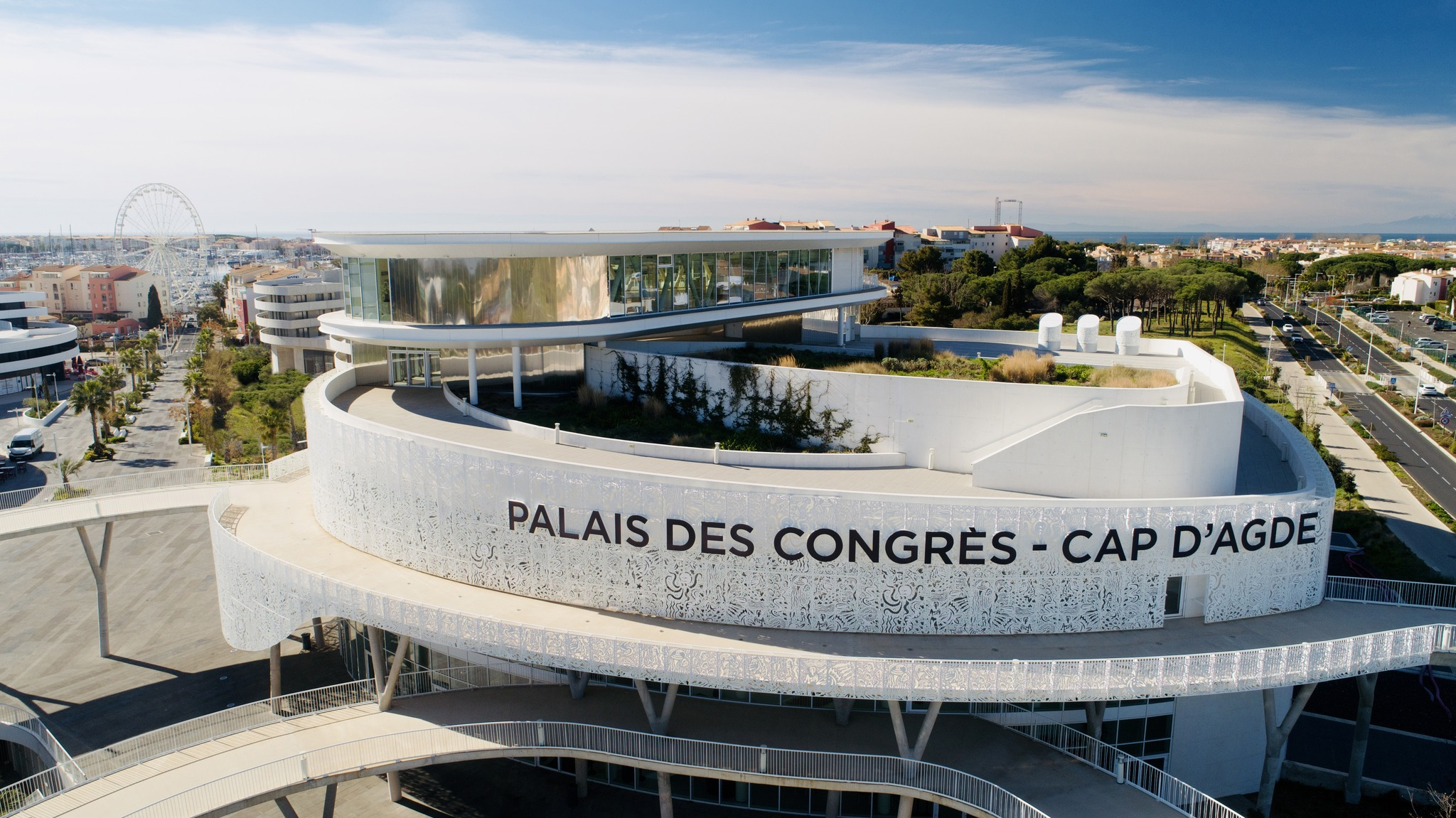
Cap d'Agde new congress centre (2019)

Agde is known for the distinctive black basalt used in local buildings such as the cathedral of Saint Stephen, built in the 12th century to replace a 9th-century Carolingian edifice built on the foundations of a fifth-century Roman church.

Bishop Guillaume fortified the cathedral's precincts and provided it with a 35-metre donjon (keep). The Romanesque cloister of the cathedral was demolished in 1857.

The sanctuary of Notre-Dame-du-Grau was once an ancient temple, for dévotion in the Antique. The Agenouillade (Kneel) is built after a miraculous prayer by Our Lady (Mary, mother of Jesus) to avoid flooding in Agde in the Sixteenth century.

Near by the Agde Round Lock, aside the rail-way (with a special station for a private stop), is a villa, Château Laurens. Inside is a gothic style "salon de concert" with original 19th century stained glass windows from Bézier's school. All like some wine châteaux of Bordeaux were built in classic style due to winery riches, this one coming from an Agde vineyard income. But if it includes an electric power plant, it does not include a producer wine cellar.

The urban planning of the 60s in France for the new towns separates car traffic and pedestrian-cyclist traffic with some footbridges. For French resorts architecture, "Mediterranean style" sets the mood. This vision of the popular vacation with its French social side is associated with the real estate. In this area, the way was given by the neighbor town Sète for its after-war development, mainly with the retail area of its harbour.

The Bishops's Mill is now (2010) a cultural exhibition center, it was " a 13th-century building and former flour mill rehabilitated in the last century as a hydraulic factory and then as a "sardine factory".

The cooperative winery is created in 1936, but merged in 1998 with the one of Marseillan, activity in Marseillan, traffic on Béziers-Sète road. It is transformed into offices and apartments in 2021.

Former National and Municipal Police Station is founded in the old building of National Police in the town-center in 2004, the new one is an extension. And the new establishment replacing the old one in Cap center is open in 2020 (cost 1,2 million€).

The Musée de l'Éphebe was inaugurated in 1987 after a series of clandestine archaeological excavations of the Roman villa in front of the arena, culminating in the first official underwater archaeological museum.

The modernist movement in the town design can be seen in social housing as well as institutional buildings such as retirement homes, hospital and hôtels. During the "Trente Glorieuses", high schools were built for baby boomers, with their stadiums, gyms and swimming pools. In Agde, for example, the historic 1975 Sunflower swimming pool has been transformed into a yoga and gymnastics hall.

In the 2000s the International Style is associated with wealth, and it appears in new construction sites with glass facades or rhythmically perforated metal facades, this becomes the decided new rule for the appearance of buildings to improve the value of the city with the aim of attracting more prosperous people to live there.

The new municipal and departmental swimming pool L'Archipel, cité de l'eau, is created in 2011, a wooden structure, glass roof.

The new Cap d'Agde Center was designed with first its casino and second its congress center. The designer is Jean-Michel Wilmotte (architect), with its twin Spanish-style esplanades (Barcelona) (2018 the first one, 2020 the twins), tall circular buildings with large crenellations on the upper floors plus interior gardens, a new annex of the town hall, a new post office, a new congress centre (architect Philippe Bonon and Hervé di Rosa), a new tourist office, ground floors a shopping area (housing starts from 2020 to 2024). Circular Casino Barrière (architect Philippe Bonon), is the first built with the today redevelopment of the Ile des Loisirs.

The Maison des Savoirs, former Agde high school transferred to Paul Emile Victor school in Cap d'Agde site, is a Médiathèque, it is the transformation of the old school (built in the 19th century), the first phase was designed in 2000 by Denis Milhé, the second phase is that of Philippe Bonon, opened in 2020.

The theatre, associated with the media library of the Maison des Savoirs has been rehabilitated since 2020, the whole renovation of the esplanade starting from the Hérault and ending at the theatre will end in 2024.

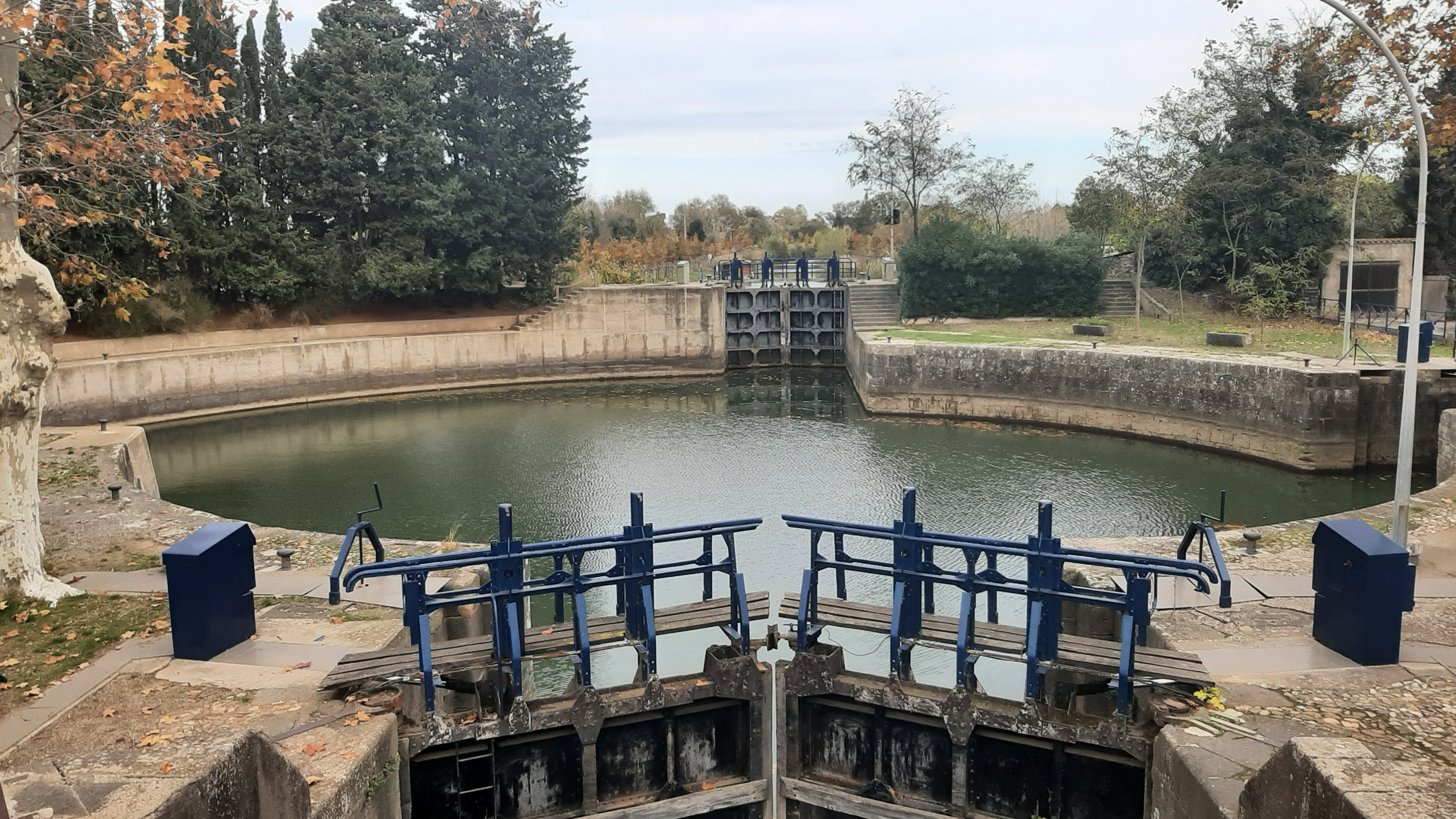
Agde Round Lock

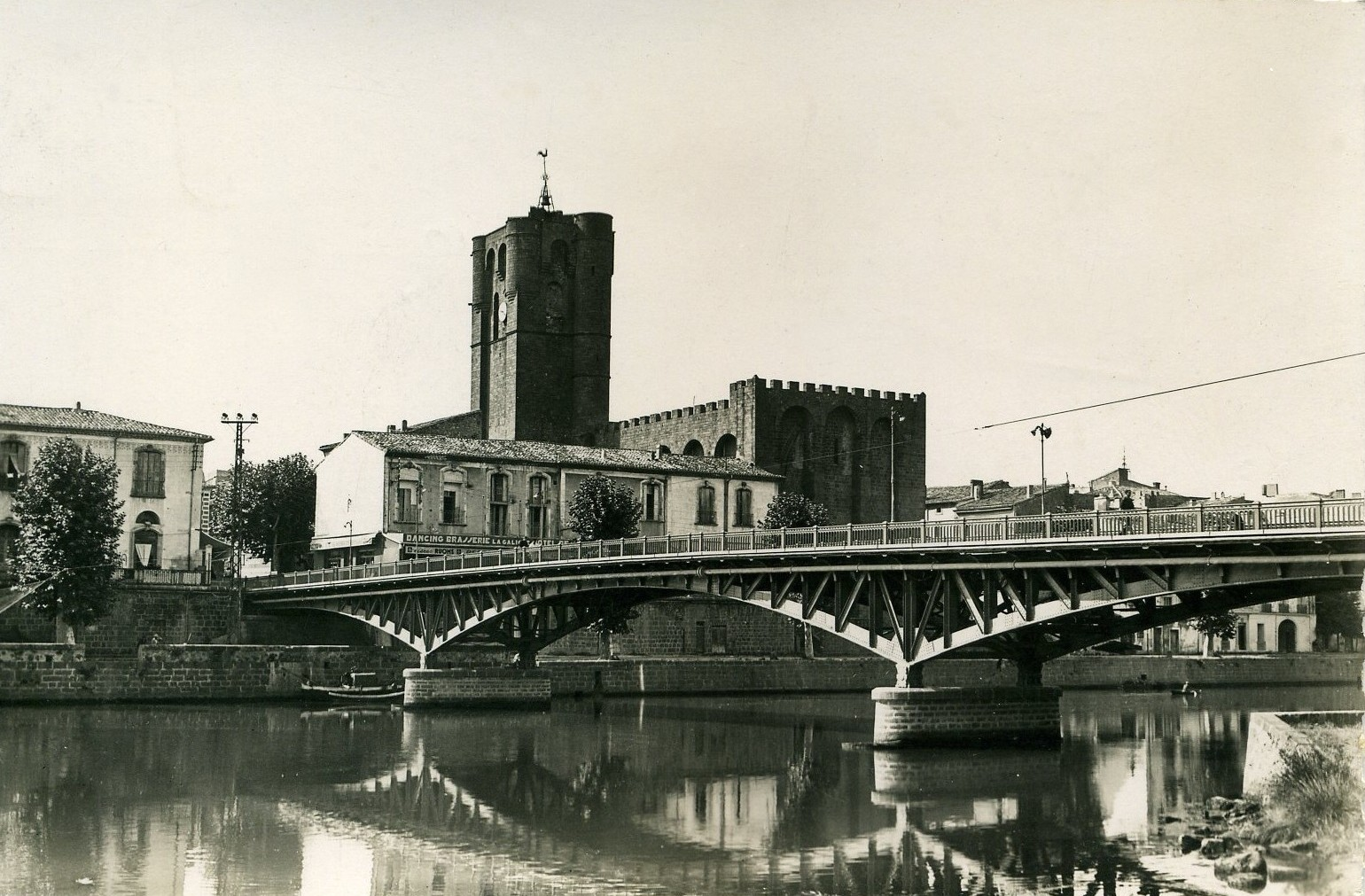
Iron frame bridge in the centre of Agde after the Belle Epoque suspension bridge before contemporary concrete bridge

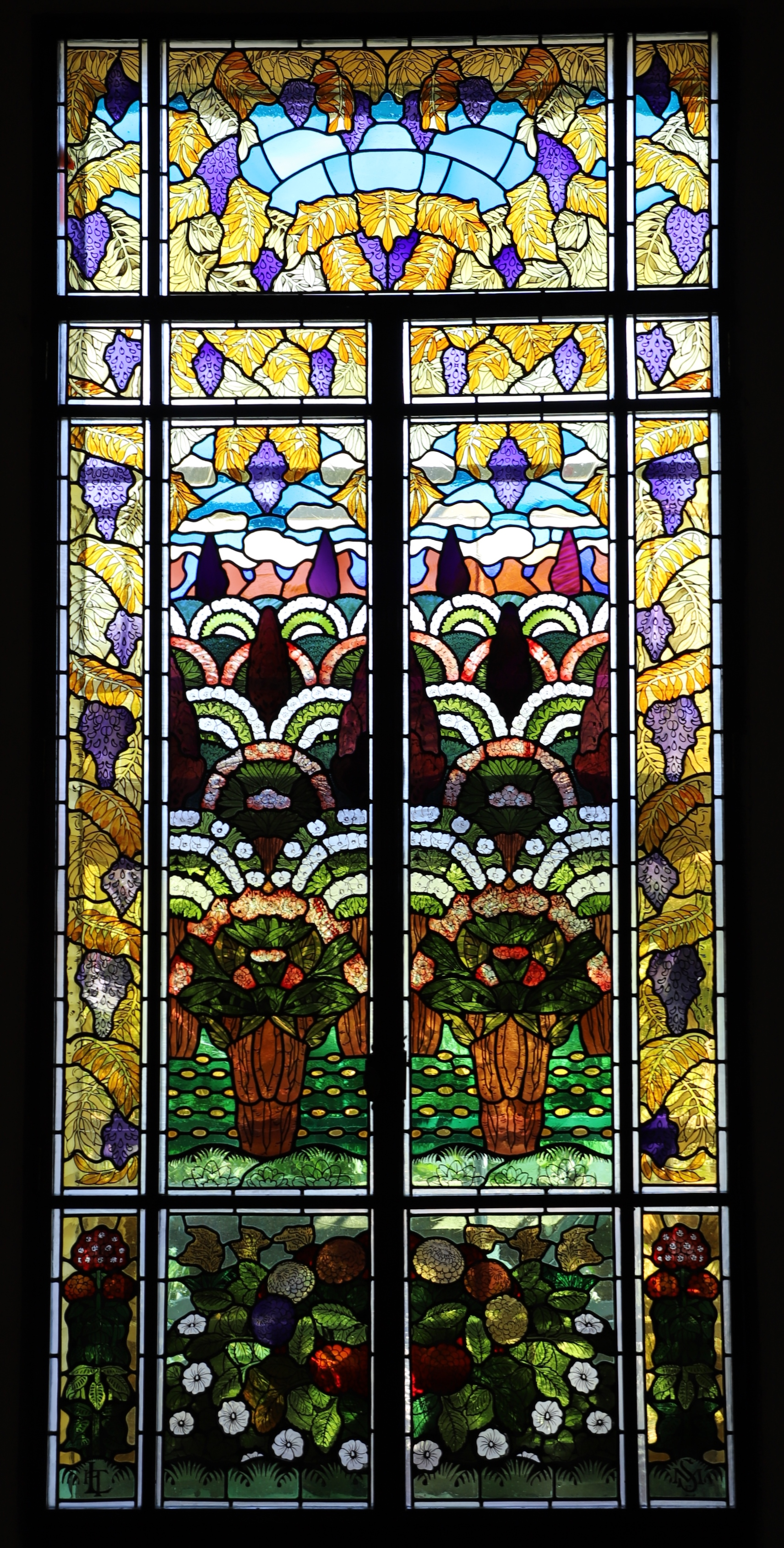
Chateau Laurens glass window with floral pattern in private living room

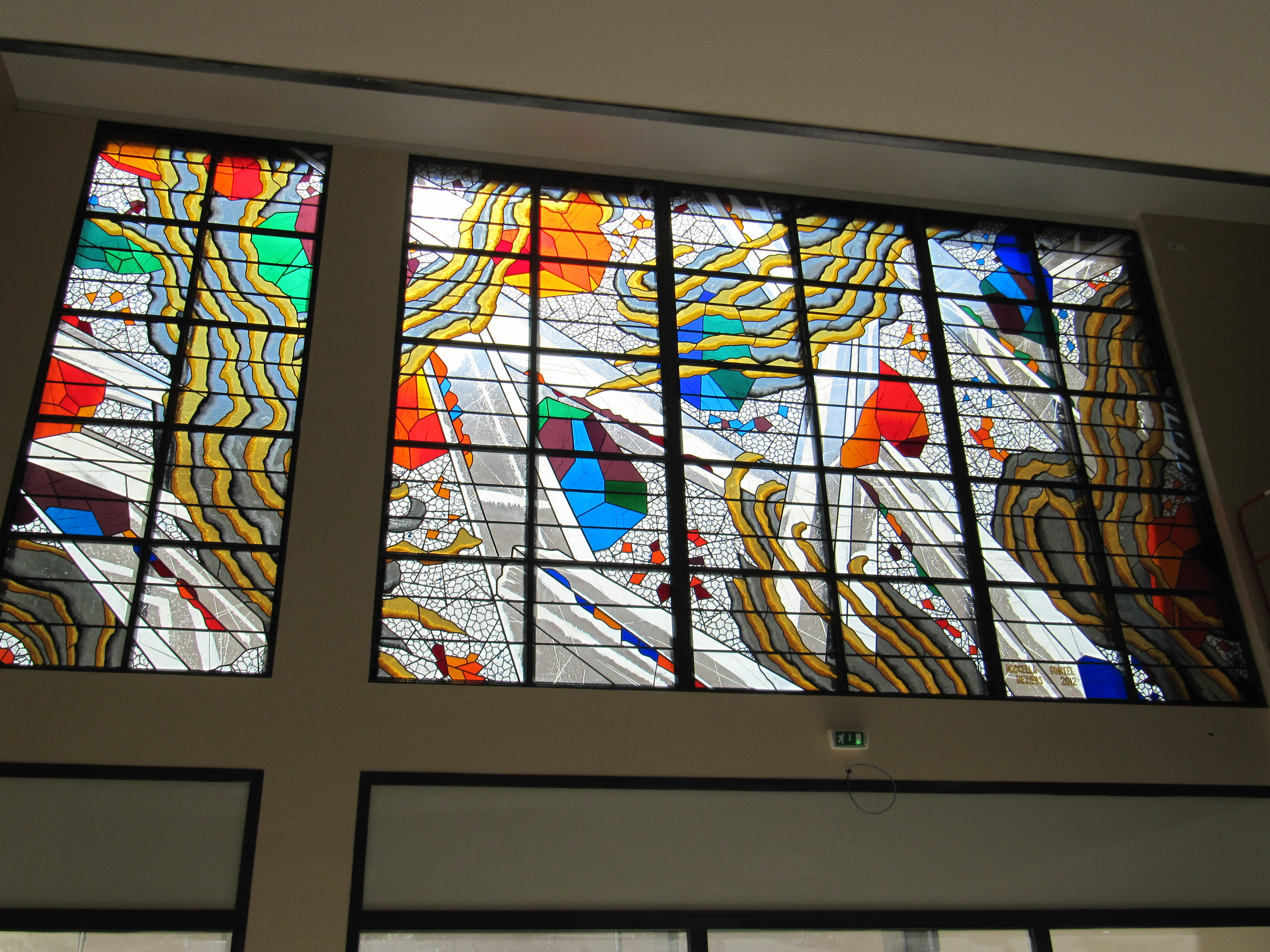
Stained glass window of the Tourist Office, represents microscopic structure of carbon

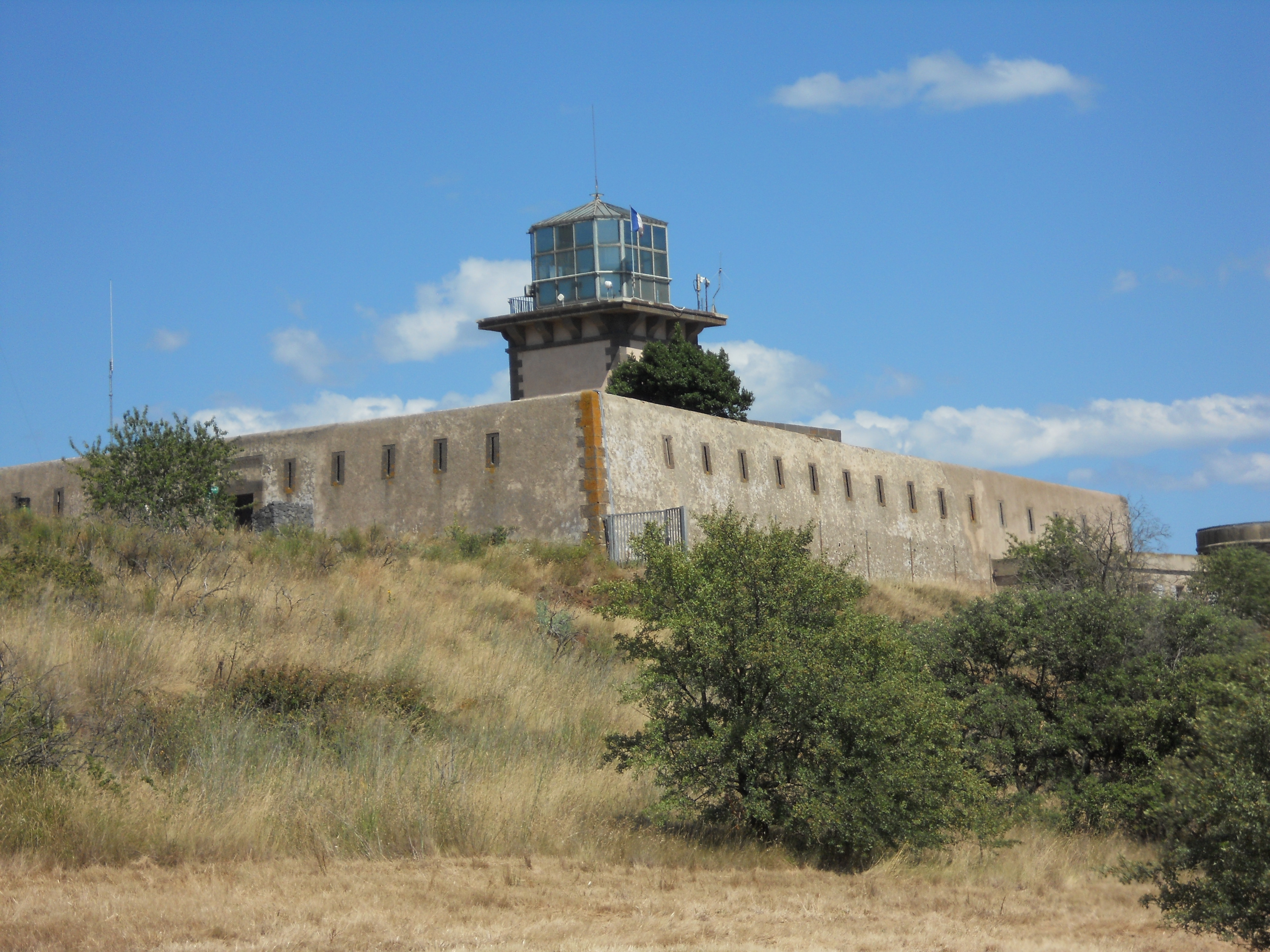
Watchtower over wineyards, known as the "Tour des Anglais" ("Tower of the Englishes"), current establishment of the Army

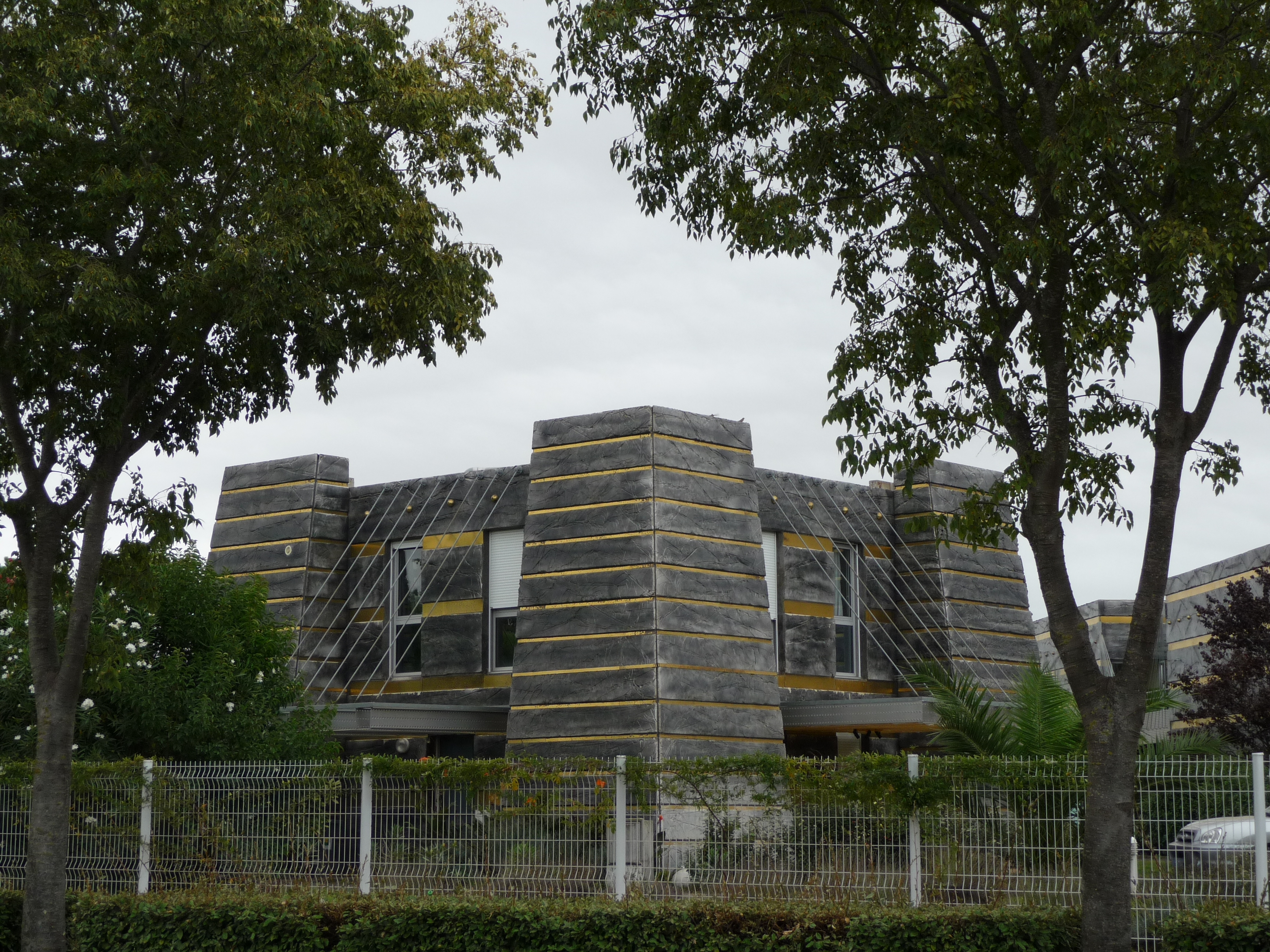
High school Paul Emile Victor, 2006, reminding Aztec pyramid (P.E. Victor studied them) in the continuation of 70's pyramidal architecture with brutalism

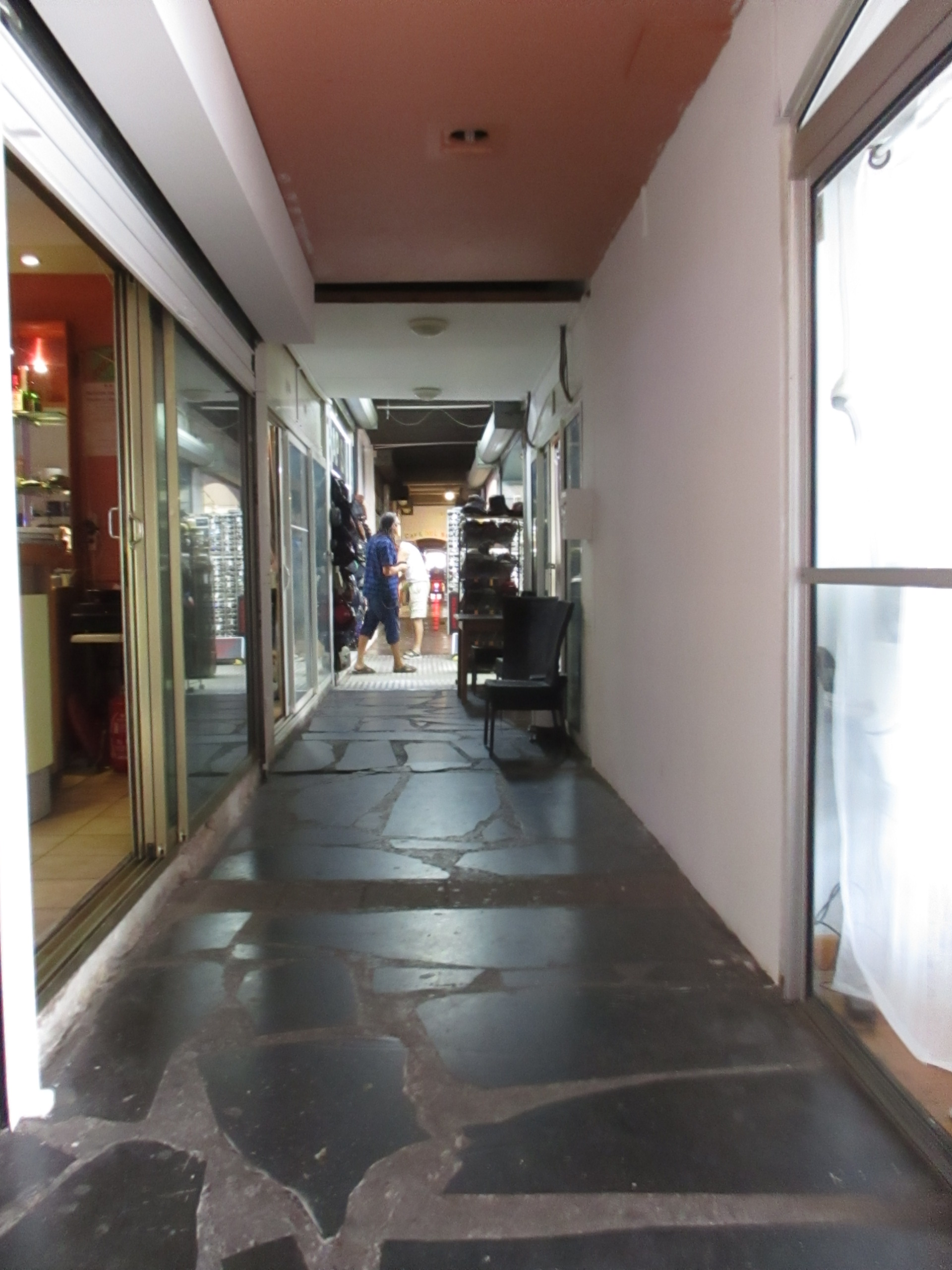
Cap d'Agde Port traboule in the buildings, between boutiques and restaurants

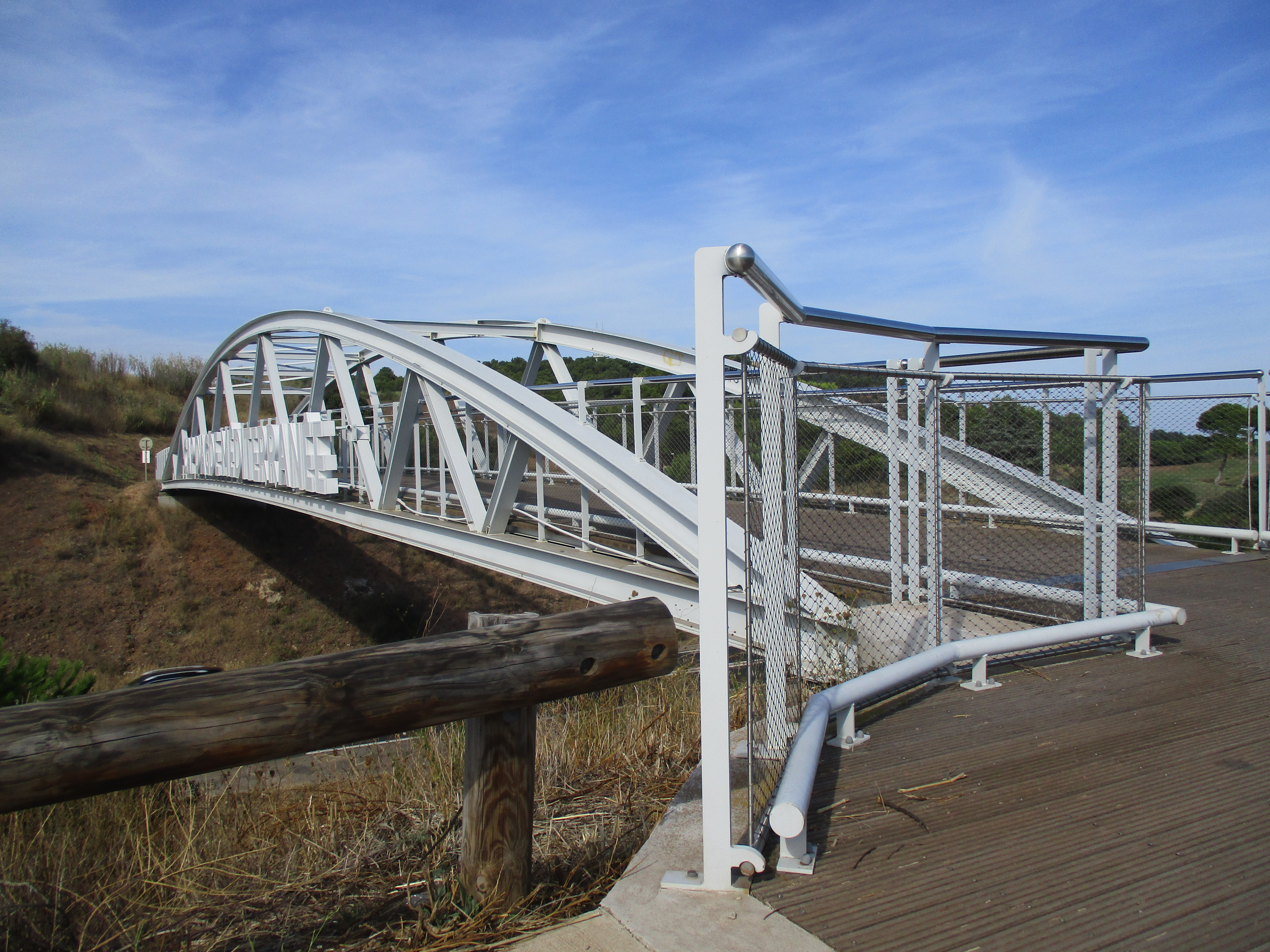
Cap d'Agde iron bridge over road Beziers-Sète

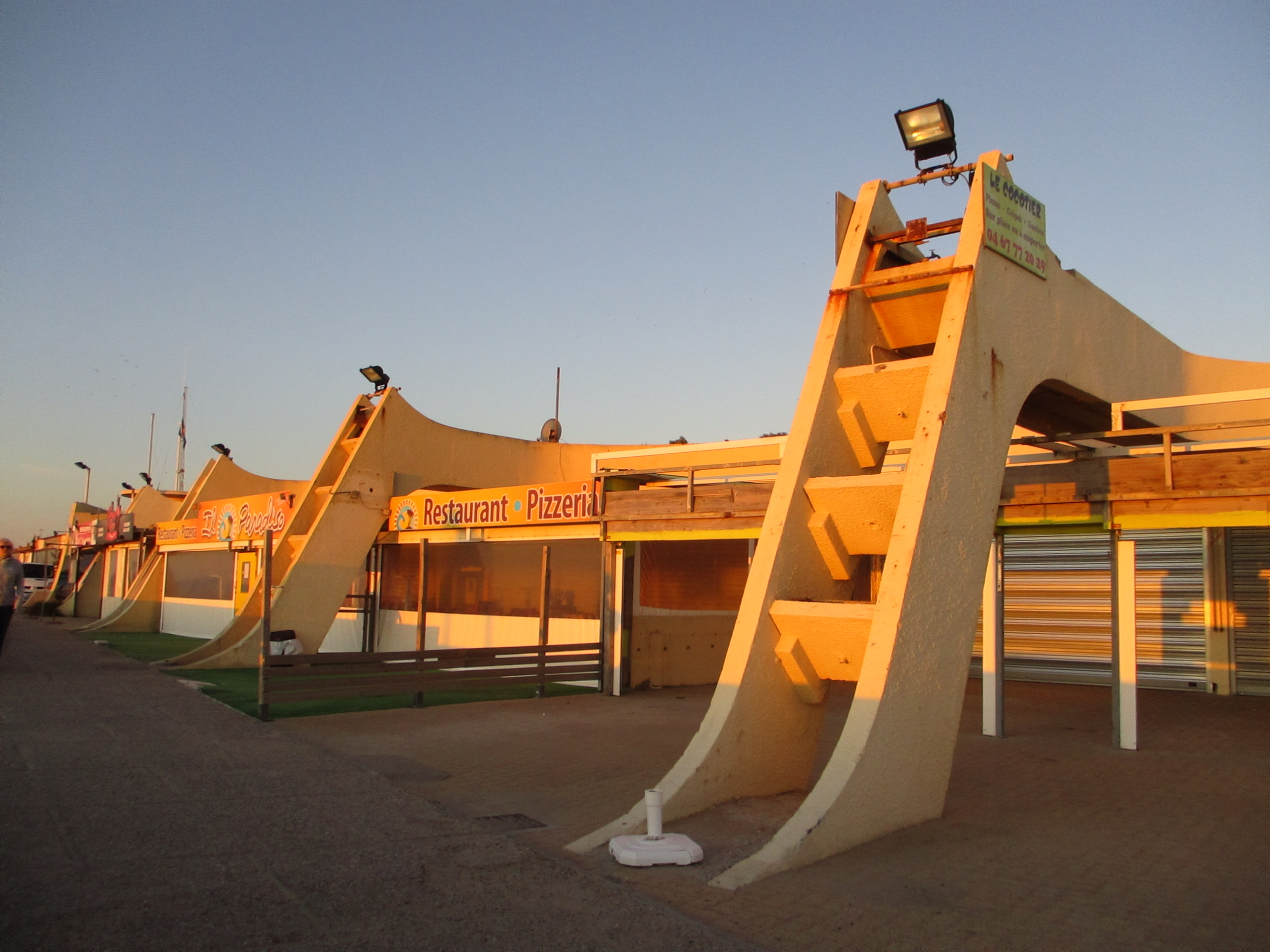
Beach La Roquille, "front de mer" restaurants and sandwicheries, architecture 1970

== History of the communities in Agde ==
=== Jewish community ===
It is assumed that a Jewish community was established in the town around the sixth century AD. During the Council of Agde, assembled by the Catholic church in 506 AD, Christian laymen and ecclesiastics were prohibited from eating with Jews or hosting them. This prohibition suggests that the town Jews held good relations with their town neighbours. It is also assumed that the Jewish community was never large, since it did not own a cemetery and buried their dead in Béziers, three miles away.

The Jewish name of the city was Agdi, or Akdi (אגדי).

=== Agde camp ===
Agde was one of the Internment camps in France, 1936–1946, for the "dangerous people".

"In February 1939, Agde had a population of 9,000 when the army decided to build a camp at its gates to accommodate 25,000 Spanish “Retirada” republicans. When war was declared, they were replaced by soldiers from the Czechoslovak army, joined a year later by workers from Indochina. In May–June 1940, the town welcomed a large number of French refugees, as well as Belgians, Poles and Czechoslovakians, (including Jews), many of whom were interned in the camp."

During World War II, about two thousand Jews from Germany and Austria were sent to the camp near the town; most were deported on 24 August 1942.

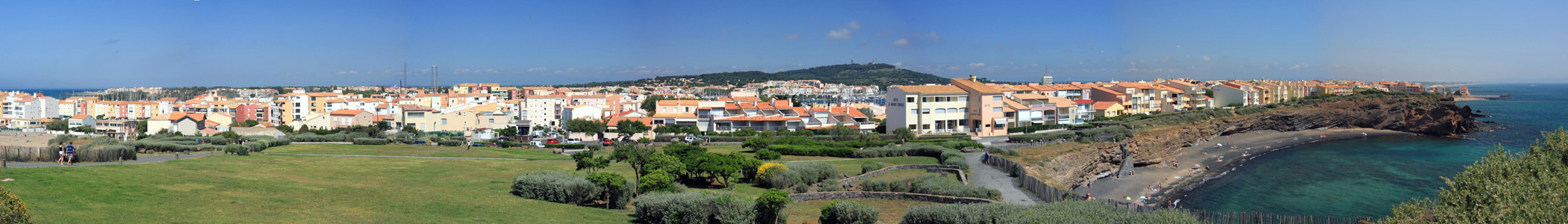
D-Day Memorial

== Sport and leisure ==
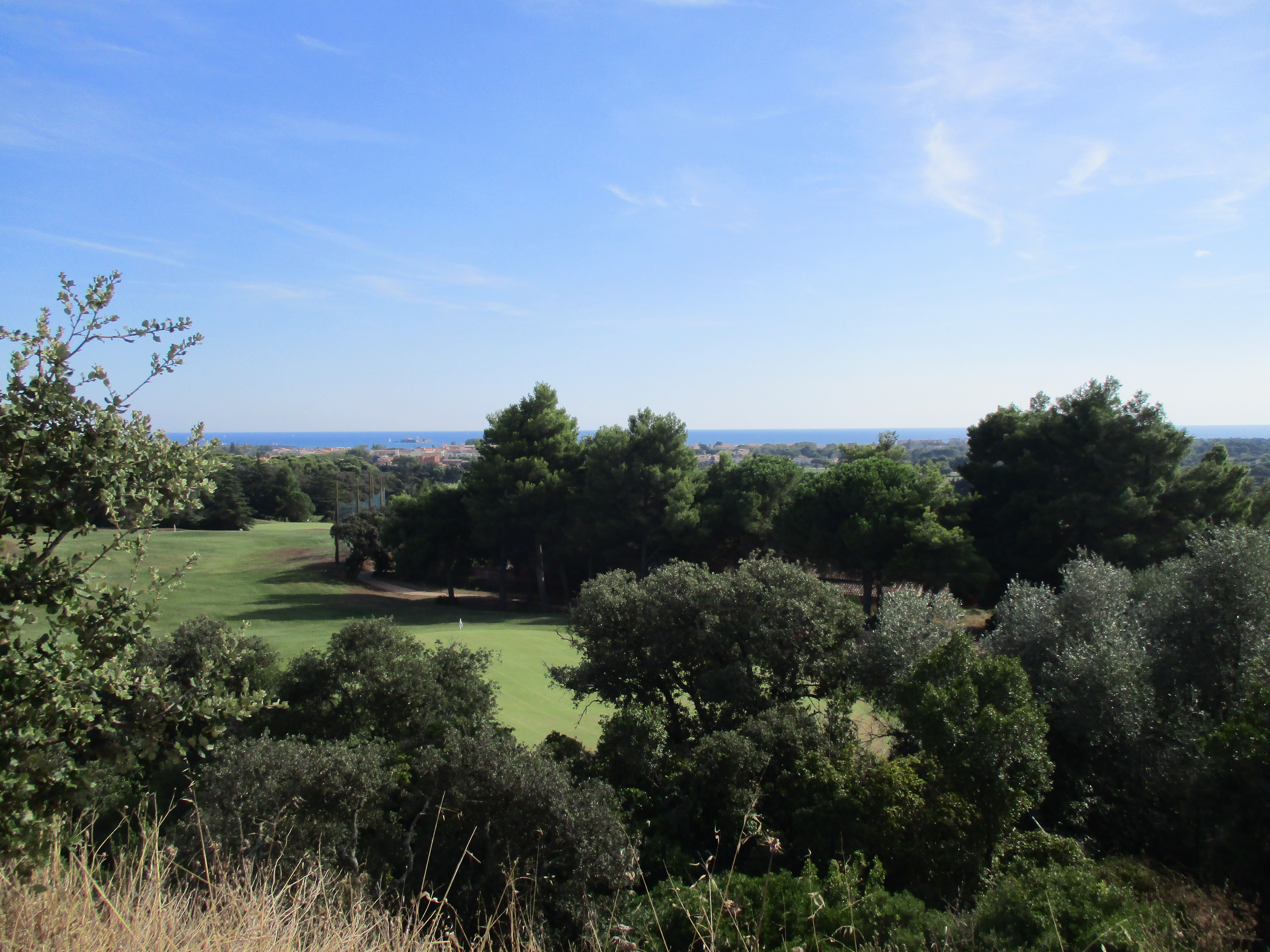
Agde golf course (seen from Mt St Martin, back to the housing estates) (basis 1980, extension 2013)

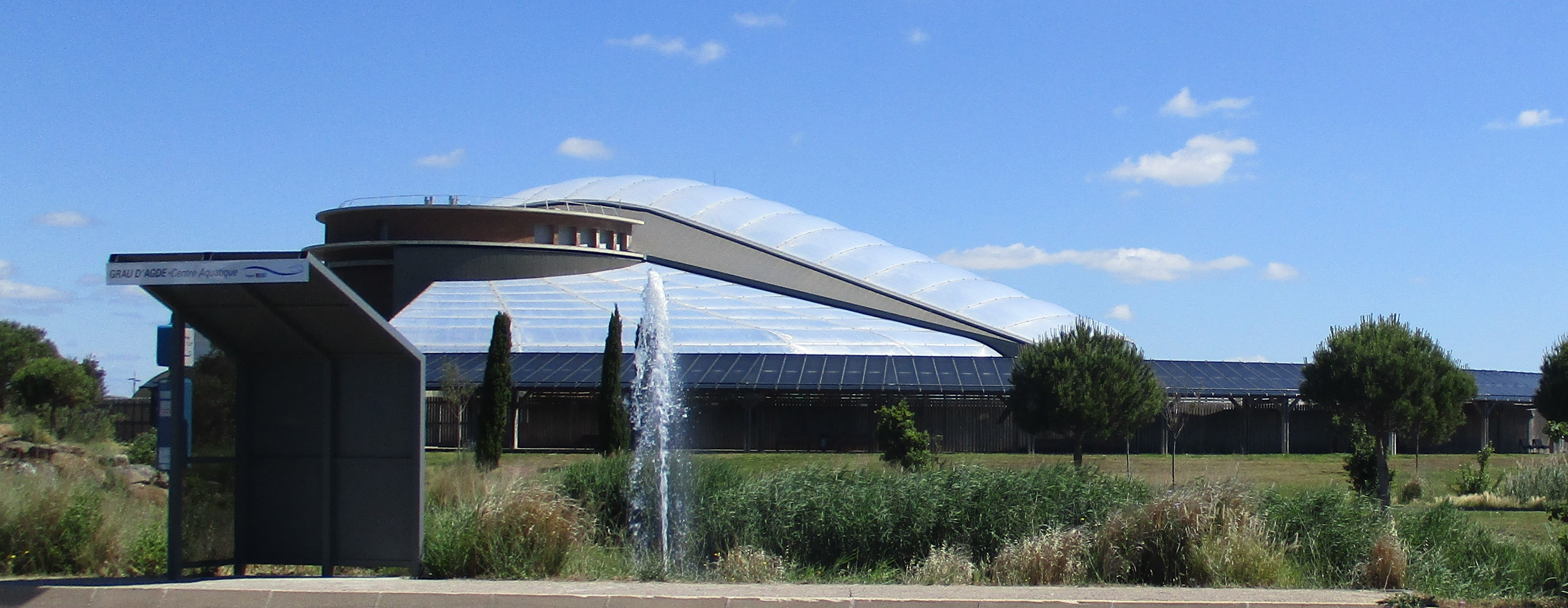
Swimming pool Cité de l'eau, overall shape Japanese helmet design (deliberate, inspired by comic book manga). Foreground bus station. 2017

The seaside resort of Agde has 14 km of sand for 10 beaches including 15 seasonal private beaches between Grau d'Agde and Port Ambonne.

Bagnas natural reserve since 1984
Bagnas

Boat show for traders since 1999
Salon nautique

Tennis since 1973
1973, le Camp Barthès au Cap-d'Agde

Vinocap since 2009
Vinocap

Deuch' since 2022
La folie Deuch'

E-mobility
e-mobility

In 1973 "Cap-d'Agde was the temple of the yellow ball in the camp created by Pierre Barthès, before being the Mecca of naturism".

In 1993 the Mediterranean Games began in Cap d'Agde. To celebrate the memory of first 1601 historic tournament in town, in 2001 the city of Agde organised major festivities bringing together all the jousting societies of the region.

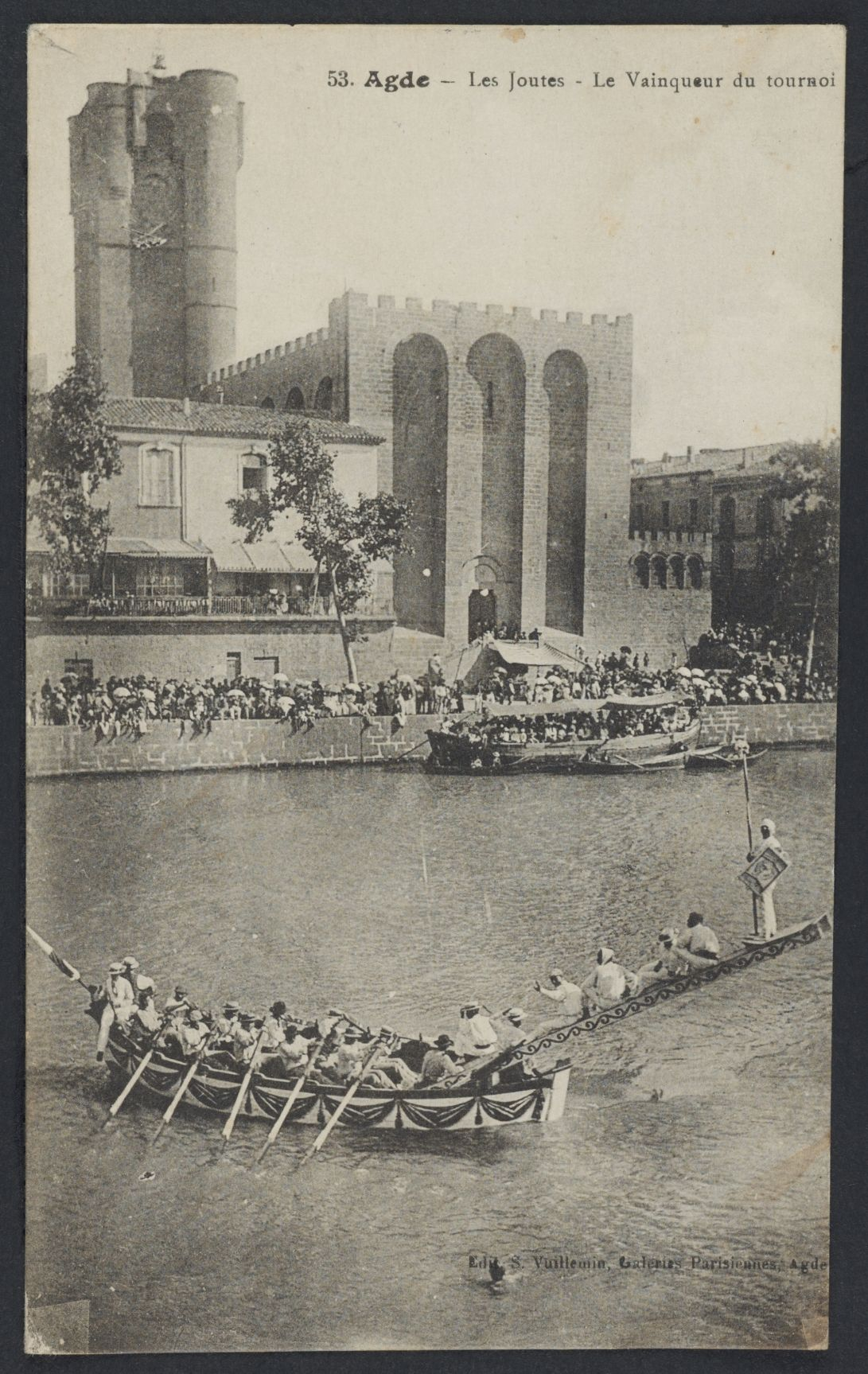
Agde joutes, Belle Epoque

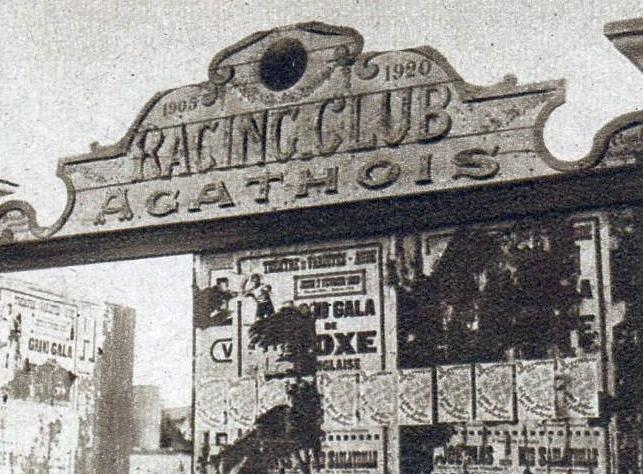
Racing Club Agathois, 1929

Agde has a football club RCO Agde who play at the Stade Louis Sanguin. They currently play in the Championnat de France amateur 2.

Agde also has a rugby club, Rugby Olympique Agathois (ROA), who play in the French Federale 1 competition.

== Administrative and budgetary structure ==
Agde urban zones 2009.

Since the 1960 Racine plan for national mass tourism, the town of Agde has been divided into 3 entities: Agde, Cap d'Agde and Grau d'Agde. However, there is only one town with no arrondissements, managed by a single council and a single mayor. Consequently, there is only one zip code.

In 2024, the town's responsibilities include town planning, building permits, social housing, parks, gardens and stadiums, and local roads. Police powers remain the responsibility of the municipalities even if Agde was one of the prototypes of the gathering in the same premises its municipal police, and the national police (2020), and that the mayor is responsible for directing and planning emergency. One of the main problems since 2020 is the drinkable water supply on a too old network (1970) that leaks, with the climatic problem of drougth.

The budget for all actions within this framework is provided mainly by local taxes on housing and industrial and commercial activity, (plus the garbage collection tax, for the "Sictom" waste collection center in Pézenas since 2014 for Agde).

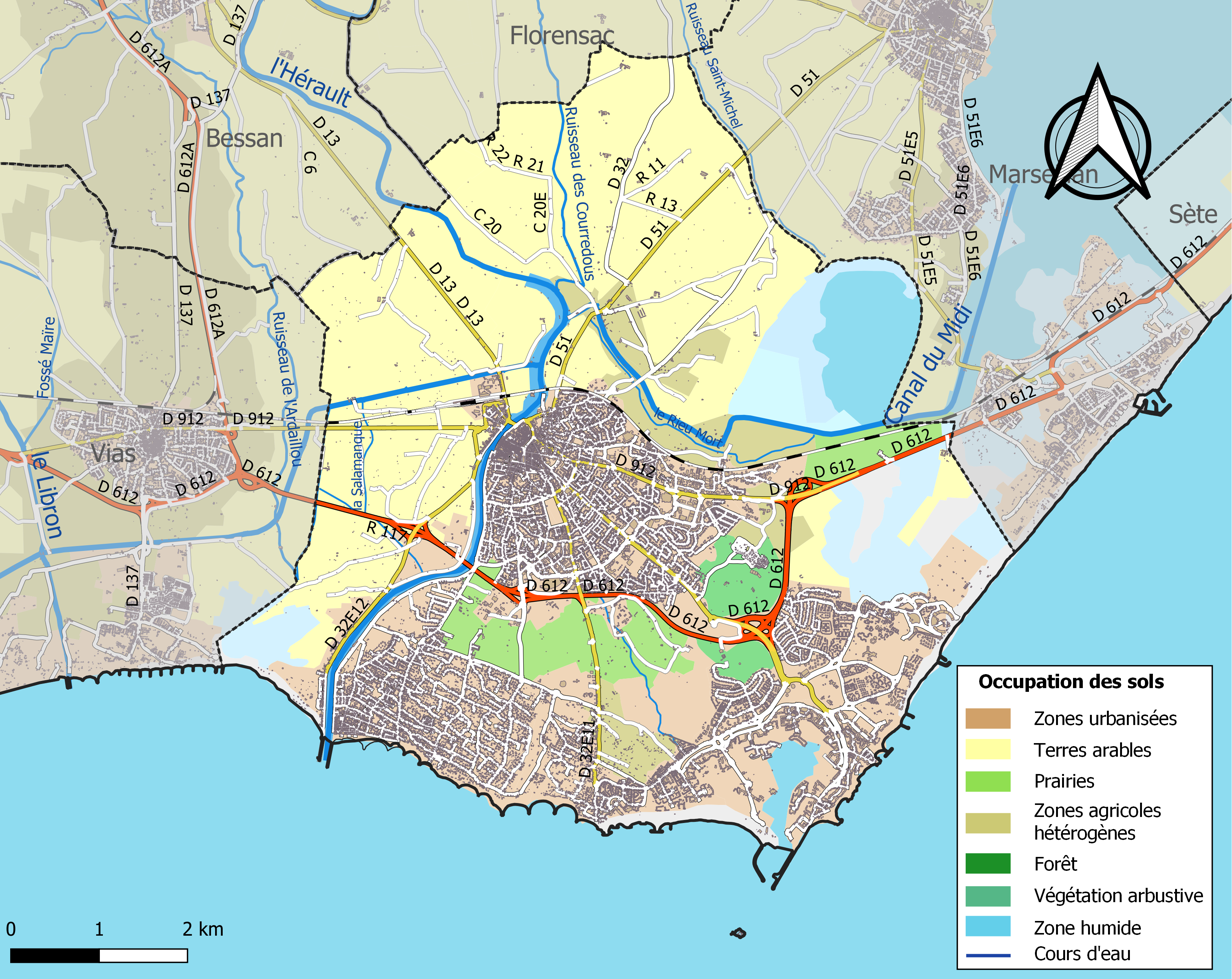
Agde infrastructure and land use in 2018, (Étang de Thau in north-east).

Since 2003, an Agglomeration of communities for the administration of 20 communes (with Agde 24,651 inhabitants and Pézenas 8,317 inhabitants (2012) as the main towns) has been founded under the name "Agglomération Hérault Méditerranée". "With a total population of 2,294 permanent residents and around 350,000 in season, this represents a surface area of 371 km2, 20km-long coastline."

The declared competencies and responsibilities in place of the municipalities of the agglomeration are : "Agriculture, Quality of life, Water and wastewater treatment, Budget management, Environment, Housing, Leisure and Arts and Crafts (Media libraries, Swimming-pool), Heritage, Public transport (Cap'Bus)."

For Agde's old town, an urban contract for social cohesion (CUCS) was signed between the Hérault-Méditerranée agglomeration community and the French government in 2007.

=== Protecting people and property ===
Since January 1, 2018, the law has assigned the block of competencies relating to Water Environment Management and Flood Prevention (GEMAPI) to the agglomeration [and not to town halls]. The territory is particularly exposed to a double risk, of flooding on the one hand, with a rich hydrographic network including the Hérault river and its watershed, and on the other, of marine submersion.

The Agglomération is responsible for the maintenance and monitoring of several urban flood protection dykes in Agde territory.

=== Green spaces department ===
Developing dry gardens, encouraging the planting of perennials, pruning trees and mowing stadium lawns with the pooling of equipment and machinery: the Agglomération's 100 employees keep public spaces clean. Their job is to clean streets and sidewalks, parking lots, squares and public gardens. I.e, there are 70 km of hedges in Cap d'Agde.

=== Waste water reused ===
The first project of its kind in France is to irrigate the golf course (a private area). It is materialized with the construction by the Agglomeration of the storage reservoir and a first launch in 2018, avoiding the use of 200,000 m3 drinking water. "Eventually, part of Agde's green spaces will be able to be irrigated by treated water from the "POSIDONIA" wastewater treatment plant".

== Twin towns – sister cities ==
Agde is twinned with:

- Antequera, Spain

== See also ==
- Cap d'Agde, the main seaside resort of Agde
- Le Grau d'Agde, the Hérault river and seaside resort of Agde
- Ancient Diocese of Agde
- List of traditional Greek place names
- Communes of the Hérault department

== Bibliography ==
- Camps, Christian (1999). Agde d'hier à aujourd'hui (in French). les Éd. de la Tour Gile. p. 296. ISBN 978-2-87802-357-2.
- Monfort, Hervé (1999). Agde, un autre regard sur la ville (in French). Ed DU LYS. p. 95. ISBN 978-2-951-47320-1.
- Félix, Laurent; Palouzié, Hélène; et al. (15 June 2023). LE CHÂTEAU LAURENS. Le Cherche midi. p. 200. "Laurent Félix, head of the heritage department of the Hérault Méditerranée urban community. Hélène Palouzié, Regional Curator of Historic Monuments."
