= Kieldrecht Lock =

Lock in the Port of Antwerp, Belgium

- Kieldrechtsluis
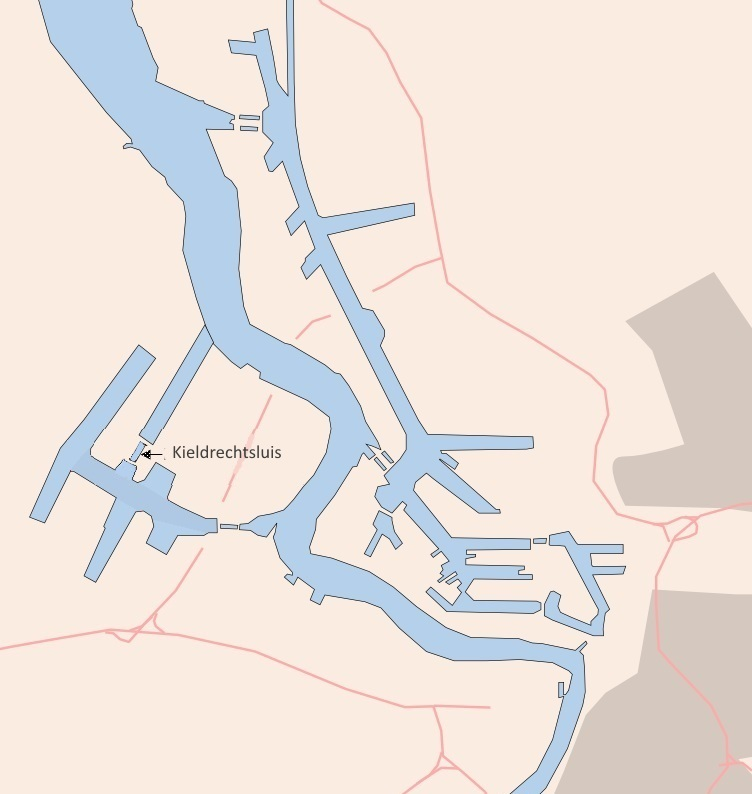
- Map showing location of the Kieldrecht Lock (marked Kieldrechtsluis) within the Port of Antwerp
- Interactive map of Kieldrecht Lock
- 51°16′44″N 4°14′52″E
- Waterway: Waasland Canal and The Deurganck Dock
- Country: Belgium
- County: Beveren
- First built: October 2011 – May 2016
- Length: 500 m (1,640 ft 5 in)
- Width: 68 m (223 ft 1 in)
- Fall: Varies according to sea-level

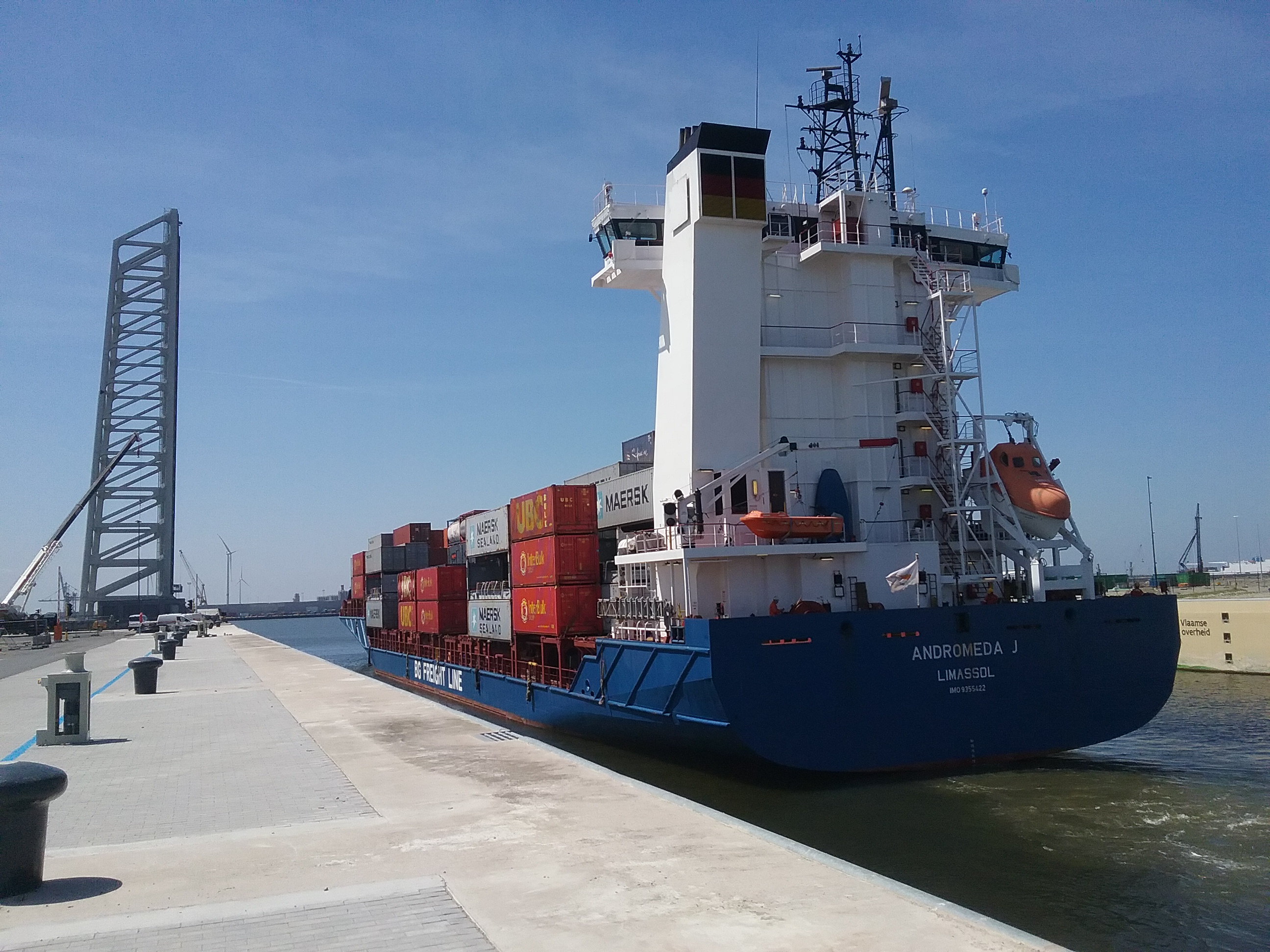
The Andromeda J (IMO 9355422 - 2006) in the Kieldrecht Lock, June 2016

The Kieldrecht Lock (Dutch: Kieldrechtsluis), referred to as the Deurgank Dock Lock (Dutch: Deurgankdoksluis) during construction, is the largest lock in the world when only considering water volume. The Kieldrecht Lock is the newer of two locks that give access to the left-bank docks of the Port of Antwerp in Belgium, between the Scheldt river and the Waasland Canal. The creation of the Kieldrecht lock has relieved the amount of traffic for the Waasland Canal that the Kallo Lock was experiencing. The lock, situated in the municipality of Beveren, was opened on 10 June 2016 in the presence of King Philippe of Belgium.

== Construction ==
On 24 October 2011, work started on the Kieldrecht Lock on the left bank of the Scheldt. The construction of the lock was completed on 27 April 2015, and the lock was filled with water. The filling with 1 million m^{3} of water took a week. The official opening was initially planned for 15 April 2016, but opening was postponed due to heavy water damage in a technical room. The opening finally took place on 10 June 2016, in the presence of King Filip. Based on the design of the Berendrecht Lock, it has the same length and width, but a bottom at 17.8 metres (58 ft) below TAW. To construct the lock, 9.1 million m^{3} of earth was excavated, and 22,000 tonnes of structural steel, three times the amount required to build the Eiffel Tower. Costing €340 million, of which 50% is financed by the European Investment Bank, the Flemish KBC Bank also made an €81 million credit line available, with the balance provided by the Antwerp Port Authority and the Flemish Government.

== Dimensions ==
The dimensions of the Kieldrecht Lock are:

- Length: 500 metres (1,600 ft)
- Width: 68 metres (223 ft)
- Operational depth below TAW: 17.8 metres (58 ft)
- Lock gates: four sliding gates
