= Berendrecht Lock =

Coordinates: 51°20′42.0″N 4°17′4.0″E

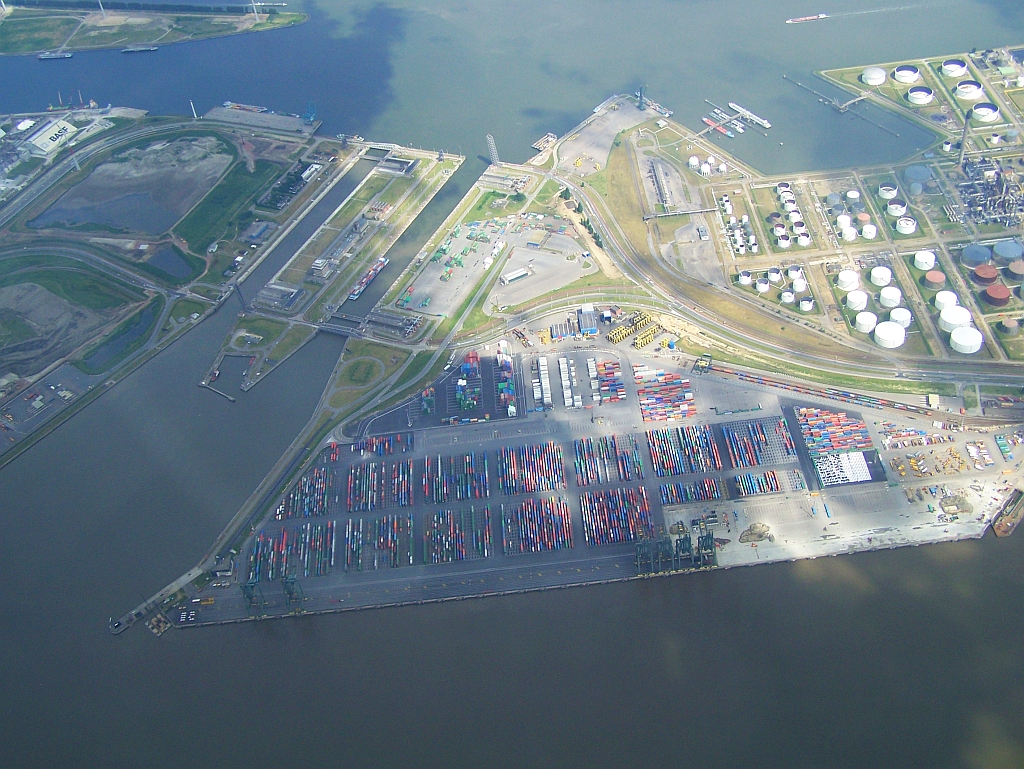
Berendrecht Lock (right) and Zandvliet Lock (left), located at the entrance to the Port of Antwerp (top) from the Scheldt (foreground)

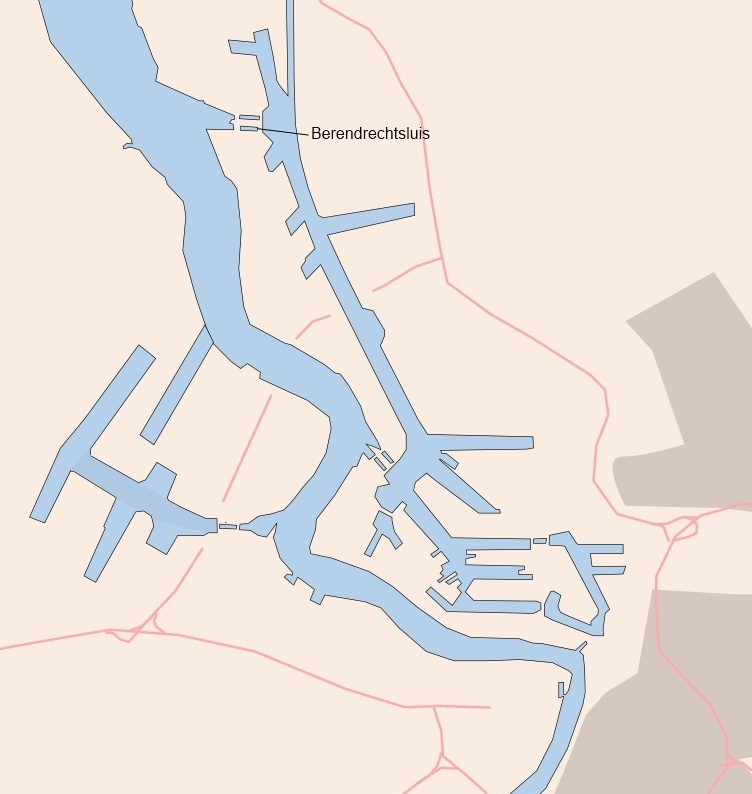
Map showing location of the Berendrecht Lock (marked Berendrechtsluis) within the Port of Antwerp

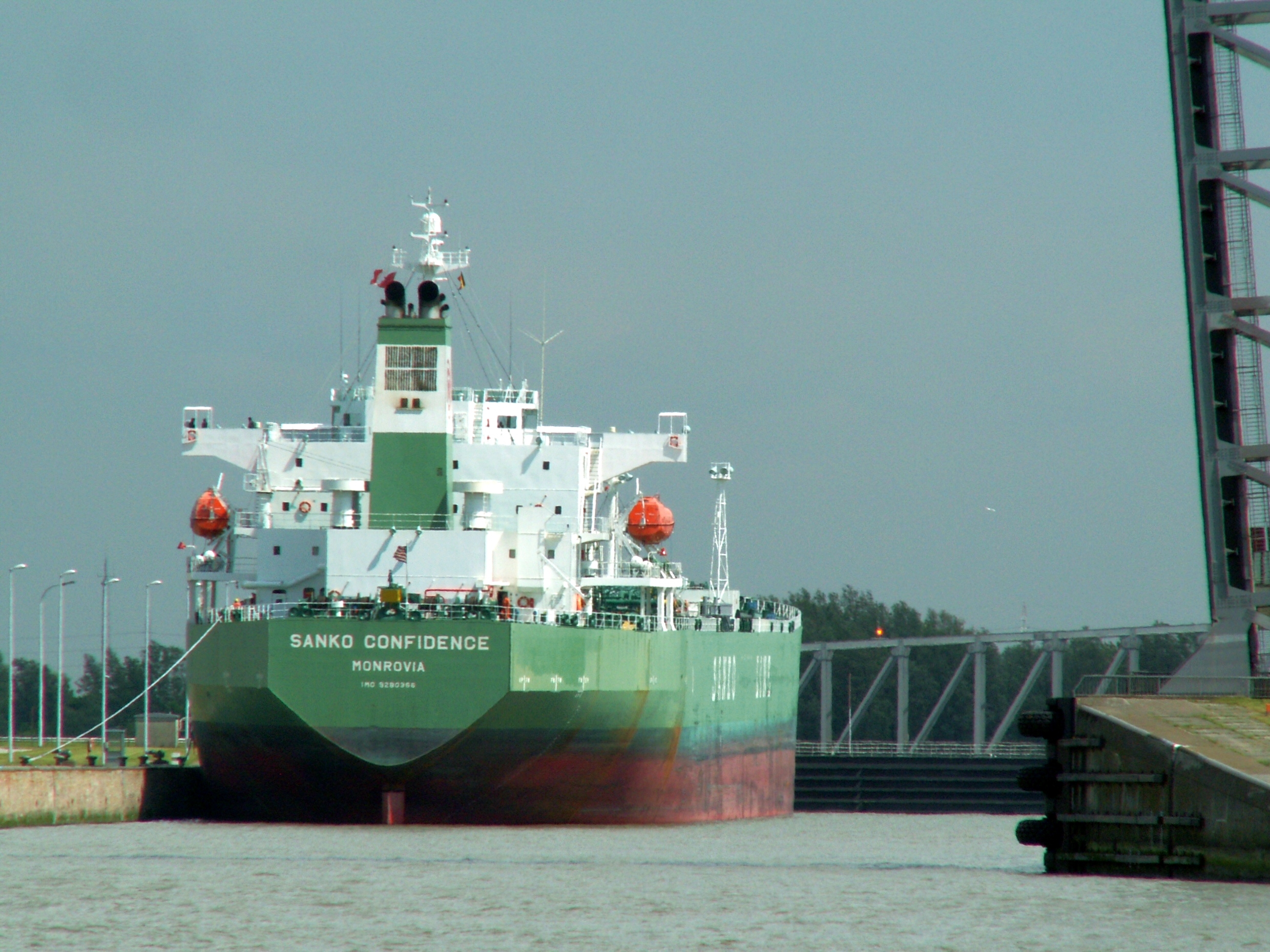
Sanko Confidence (IMO 9280366) in the Berendrecht Lock, May 2005

The Berendrecht Lock (Dutch: Berendrechtsluis) is the world's second-largest lock, providing access to the right-bank docks of the Port of Antwerp in Belgium.

== Background ==
Post World War II, work started on the Grote Doorsteek, an ambitious plan which ultimately resulted in the extension of the Antwerp docks on the right bank of the Scheldt to the Netherlands border. In 1967, the company completed the construction of the Zandvliet Lock (Zandvlietsluis), then the world's largest lock.

== Construction ==
In 1989, needing to accommodate a wider Post-Panamax ship, the company built a new lock just to the south of the Zandvliet lock. The Berendrecht Lock, which at 68 metres (223 ft) is 11 metres (36 ft) wider. Bascule bridges at the ends of each lock, (Zandvliet and Frederik-Hendrik bridges across the Zandlievet Lock; and Oudendijk and Berendrecht bridges across the Berendrecht Lock), allow full road traffic access around the port. The two locks now work as a doubled lock system.

Completion of the Berendrecht Lock allowed the extended development of the right bank docks complex, and later the creation of fast turnaround tidal berths, both on the right bank (Europa Terminal and the North Sea Terminal), and on the left bank (the Deurganck Dock).

== Dimensions ==
- Length: 500 metres (1,600 ft)
- Width: 68 metres (223 ft)
- Operational Depth (TAW): 13.5 metres (44 ft)
- Sill depth at mean high water: 17.75 metres (58.2 ft)
- Lock Gates: four sliding gates

In both length and total volume (length×breadth×difference in water levels), the Berendrecht Lock is the second-largest in the world.

== New left bank lock ==
In November 2011, work started on the Kieldrecht Lock which became in June 2016 the world's new largest lock on the left bank of the Scheldt. Based on the design of the Berendrecht Lock, it has the same length and width, but with an operational depth (TAW) of 17.8 metres (58 ft).

== See also ==
- Louis Joubert Lock, Saint-Nazaire, France: Europe's largest dry dock
