= Lock (water navigation) =

Device for raising and lowering boats or ships

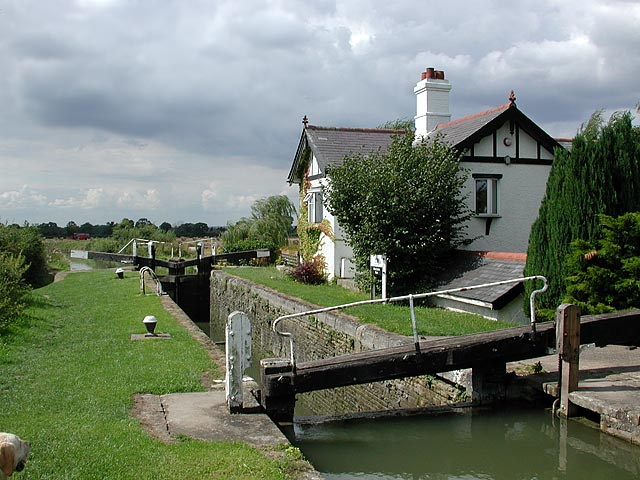
Canal lock and lock-keeper's cottage on the Aylesbury Arm of the Grand Union Canal at Marsworth in Buckinghamshire, England

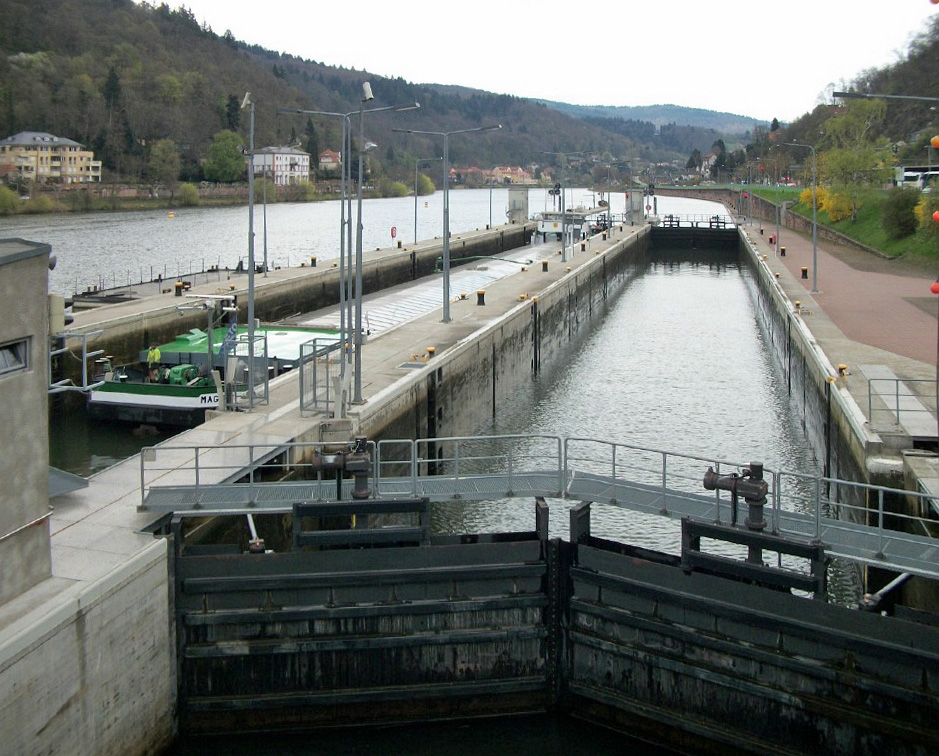
Lock on the River Neckar at Heidelberg in Germany

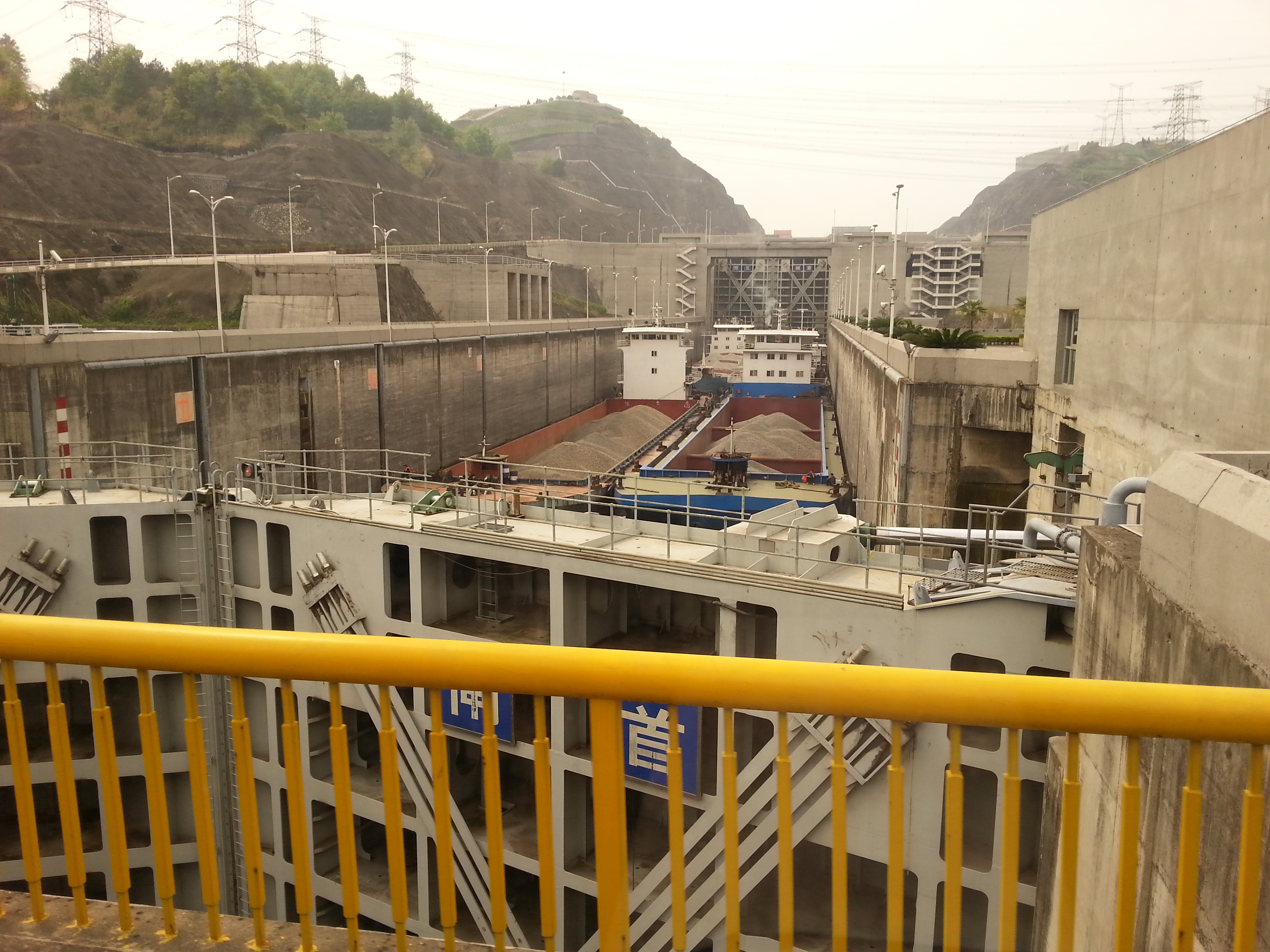
Three Gorges Dam lock near Yichang on the Yangtze river, China

A lock is a device used for raising and lowering boats, ships and other watercraft between stretches of water of different levels on river and canal waterways. The distinguishing feature of a lock is a chamber in a permanently fixed position in which the water level can be varied. In a caisson lock, a boat lift, or on a canal inclined plane, it is the chamber itself (usually then called a caisson) that rises and falls.

Locks are used to make a river more easily navigable, or to allow a canal to cross land that is not level. Over time, more and larger locks have been used in canals to allow a more direct route to be taken.

== History ==
=== Ancient Egypt ===
In ancient Egypt, river locks were probably part of the Canal of the Pharaohs. Engineers of Ptolemy II are credited by Diodorus Siculus with being the first to solve the problem of keeping the Nile free of salt water when they invented the lock around 274–273 BC.

=== Ancient China ===
Between 960 and 1279 CE, the natural extension of the flash lock, or staunch, was to provide an upper gate (or pair of gates) to form an intermediate "pound" which was all that need be emptied when a boat passed through. This type of lock, called a pound lock, was first used in medieval China during the Song dynasty (960–1279 CE). The Songshi or History of the Song Dynasty, volume 307, biography 66, records how Qiao Weiyue, a high-ranking tax administrator, was frustrated at the frequent losses incurred when his grain barges were wrecked on the West River near Huai'an in Jiangsu. The soldiers at one double slipway, he discovered, had plotted with bandits to wreck heavy imperial barges so that they could steal the spilled grain.

In 984 Qiao installed a pair of sluice-gates two hundred and fifty feet apart, the entire structure roofed over like a building. By siting two staunch gates so close to one another, Qiao had created a short stretch of canal, effectively a pound-lock, filled from the canal above by raising individual wooden baulks in the top gate and emptied into the canal below by lowering baulks in the top gate and raising ones in the lower.

=== Medieval Europe ===
In 1385, in medieval Europe a sort of pound lock was built at Vreeswijk, Netherlands. This pound lock serviced many ships at once in a large basin. Yet the first true European pound lock was built in 1396 at Damme near Bruges, Belgium. The Italian Bertola da Novate (c. 1410–1475) constructed 18 pound locks on the Naviglio di Bereguardo (part of the Milan canal system sponsored by Francesco Sforza) between 1452 and 1458.

== Basic operation ==
A plan and side view of a generic, empty canal lock. A lock chamber separated from the rest of the canal by an upper pair and a lower pair of mitre gates. The gates in each pair close against each other at an 18° angle to approximate an arch against the water pressure on the "upstream" side of the gates when the water level on the "downstream" side is lower.

Principle of operation of a pound lock
For a boat going upstream:		For a boat going downstream:
1–2.	The boat enters the lock.	8–9.	The boat enters the lock.
3.	The lower gates are closed.	10.	The upper gates are closed.
4–5.	The lock is filled with water from upstream.	11–12.	The lock is emptied by draining its water downstream.
6.	The upper gates are opened.	13.	The lower gates are opened.
7.	The boat exits the lock.	14.	The boat exits the lock.

All pound locks have three elements:

- A watertight chamber connecting the upper and lower canals, and large enough to enclose one or more boats. The position of the chamber is fixed, but its water level can vary.
- A gate (often a pair of "pointing" half-gates) at each end of the chamber. A gate is opened to allow a boat to enter or leave the chamber; when closed, the gate is watertight.
- A set of lock gear to empty or fill the chamber as required. This is usually a simple valve (traditionally, a flat panel (paddle) lifted by manually winding a rack and pinion mechanism) which allows water to drain into or out of the chamber. Larger locks may use pumps.

The principle of operating a lock is simple. For a boat travelling downstream, the process is:

- If the water in the chamber is low, the boat waits while the chamber is filled by the upstream valve.
- The upstream gates are opened and the boat moves in.
- The upstream gates are closed.
- The chamber is drained through the downstream valve until the water level matches the downstream water level.
- The downstream gates are opened and the boat moves out.

For a boat travelling upstream, the process is reversed. The whole operation will usually take between 10 and 20 minutes, depending on the size of the lock and whether the water in the lock chamber was at the boat's level or the other level when it arrived at the lock.

Boaters approaching a lock are usually pleased to meet another boat coming towards them, because this boat will have just exited the lock on their level and therefore set the lock in their favour – saving about 5 to 10 minutes. However, this is not true for staircase locks, where it is quicker for boats to go through in convoy, and it also uses less water.

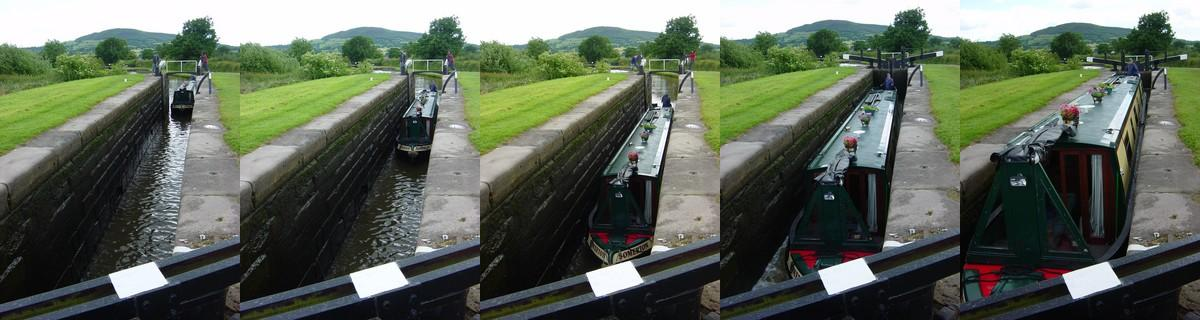
Operation of a canal lock 1–3. Boat enters 'empty' lock: 4. Bottom gates are closed, bottom paddles closed, top paddles opened, lock starts to fill; 5. Lock is filling with water, lifting boat to the higher level

== Historic lock designs ==
Historic lock designs, which are no longer used for constructing new locks as these have now been replaced by newer and better designs, are as follows:

=== Caisson lock ===
Operation of caisson lock.

Around 1800 the use of caisson locks was proposed by Robert Weldon for the Somerset Coal Canal in England. In this underwater lift, the chamber was 80 ft (24.4 m) long and 60 ft (18.3 m) deep and contained a completely enclosed wooden box big enough to take a barge. This box moved up and down in the 60 ft (18.3 m) deep pool of water. Apart from inevitable leakage, the water never left the chamber, and using the lock wasted no water. Instead, the boat entered the box and was sealed in by the door closing behind it, and the box itself was moved up or down through the water. When the box was at the bottom of the chamber, it was under almost 60 feet (18.3 m) of water – at a pressure of three atm (304 kPa; 44.1 psi), in total. One of these "locks" was built and demonstrated to the Prince Regent (later George IV), but it had various engineering problems and the design was not put into use on the Coal Canal.

=== Composite material locks ===
To economise, especially where good stone would be prohibitively expensive or difficult to obtain, composite locks were made, i.e. they were constructed using rubble or inferior stone, dressing the inside walls of the lock with wood, so as not to abrade the boats. This was done, for instance, on the Chesapeake and Ohio Canal with the locks near the Paw Paw Tunnel. and also the Chenango Canal

=== Hydro-pneumatic canal lift ===
Possibly inspired by Weldon's caisson lock, William Congreve in 1813 patented a "hydro-pneumatic double balance lock" in which two adjacent locks containing pneumatic caissons could be raised and lowered in counterbalance by the movement of compressed air from one caisson to the other. In about 1817 the Regents Canal Company built one of these locks at the site of the present-day Camden Lock, north London. Here the motivation was, again, water supply problems. The company insisted on various modifications to Congreve's design; the resulting installation proved to be unsatisfactory, and was soon replaced by conventional locks.

=== Inclined plane ===
The plane enabled wide-beam boats to bypass the flight of ten narrow locks, but failure to make improvements at the other end of the arm and high running costs led to its early demise. There are no working waterway inclined planes in the UK at the moment, but the remains of a famous one can be seen at Foxton in Leicestershire on the Leicester arm of the Grand Union Canal. There are plans to restore it, and some funding has been obtained.

=== Shaft lock ===
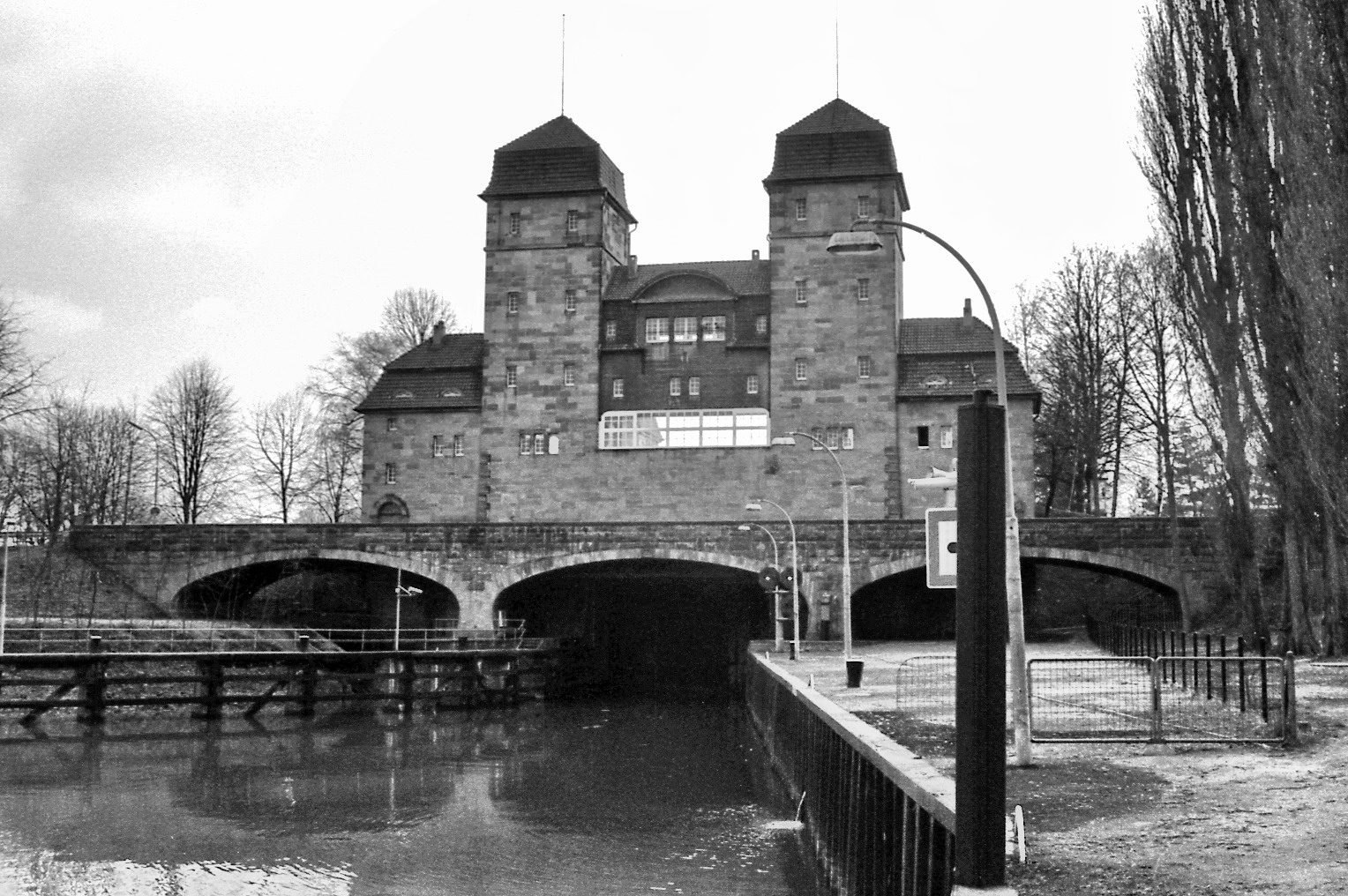
Entrance to Minden shaft lock

Looking superficially similar to the caisson lock is the shaft lock. Shaft locks consist of a deep shaft with conventional upper gates. The lower gates are reached through a short tunnel. The gates only close off this approach tunnel so do not have to reach the full height of the lock. Notable examples have been built at Saint Denis (Paris, France), Horin (near Melnik, Czech Republic) and Anderten (Hannover Germany).

The shaft lock at Minden 52°18′23″N 8°55′11″E has a fall of 12.7 metres (42 ft) and has eight tanks linked in pairs to the lock chamber. As the lock is emptied water is run into each chamber in turn, for filling the water is released from the chambers thus saving the waste of a complete lockfull of water. An earlier attempt at a shaft lock had been made at Trollhättan in Sweden on the line of the present Göta canal. The fall would have been 16 metres (52 ft), astonishing in 1749. However the approach tunnel proved to be unusable in times of flood and the shaft lock was replaced by a 2-rise staircase in 1768.

=== Turf-sided lock ===
A turf-sided lock is an early form of canal lock design that uses earth banks to form the lock chamber, subsequently attracting grasses and other vegetation, instead of the now more familiar and widespread brick, stone, or concrete lock wall constructions. This early lock design was most often used on river navigations in the early 18th century before the advent of canals in Britain. The sides of the turf-lock are sloping so, when full, the lock is quite wide. Consequently, this type of lock needs more water to operate than vertical-sided brick- or stone-walled locks. On British canals and waterways most turf-sided locks have been subsequently rebuilt in brick or stone, and so only a few good examples survive, such as at Garston Lock, and Monkey Marsh Lock, on the Kennet and Avon Canal.

== Types of lock ==
A series of photos of the Canadian Locks in Sault Ste. Marie to illustrate a drop of about 22 ft (6.7 m) in a lock

=== Basic pound lock ===
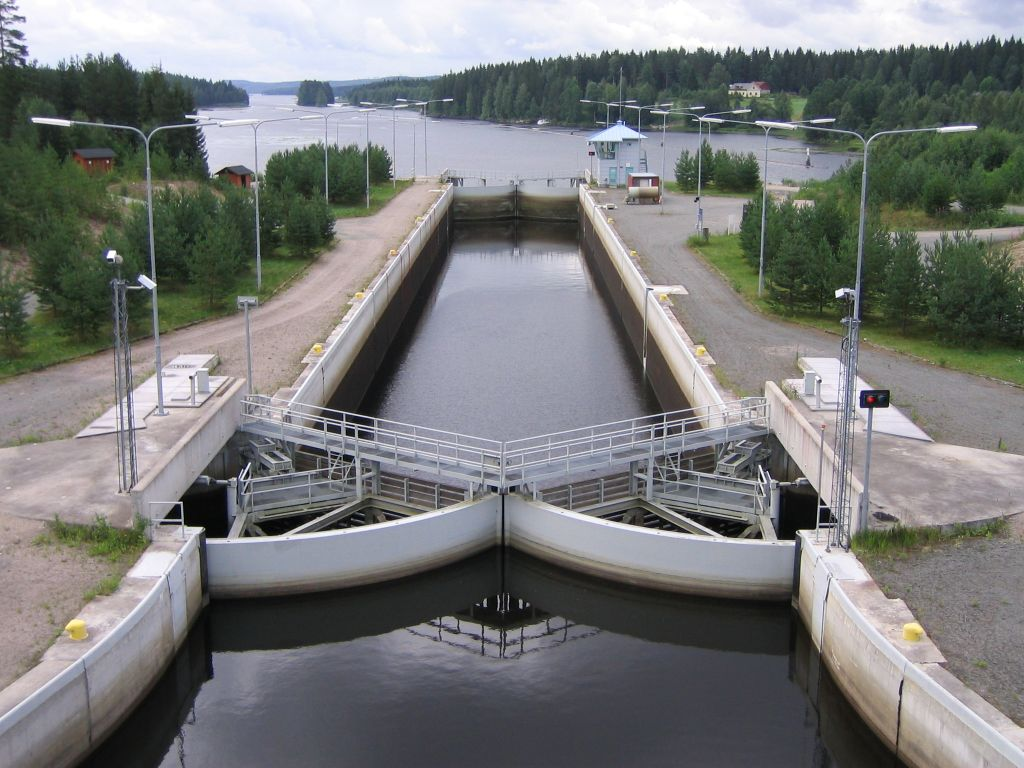
A pound lock on the Keitele–Päijänne Canal at Äänekoski in Central Finland

A pound lock is most commonly used on canals and rivers today. A pound lock has a chamber (a pound) with gates at both ends that control the level of water in the pound. In contrast, an earlier design with a single gate was known as a flash lock.

Pound locks were first used in China during the Song dynasty (960–1279 CE), having been pioneered by the Song politician and naval engineer Qiao Weiyue in 984. They replaced earlier double slipways that had caused trouble and are mentioned by the Chinese polymath Shen Kuo (1031–1095) in his book Dream Pool Essays (published in 1088), and fully described in the Chinese historical text Song Shi (compiled in 1345):

The distance between the two locks was rather more than 50 paces, and the whole space was covered with a great roof like a shed. The gates were 'hanging gates'; when they were closed the water accumulated like a tide until the required level was reached, and then when the time came it was allowed to flow out.

The water level could differ by 4 or 5 feet (1.2 or 1.5 m) at each lock and in the Grand Canal the level was raised in this way by 138 feet (42 m).

=== Composite pound locks ===
==== Diagonal lock ====
This is similar to a shaft lock, but having the shaft built on an incline. Boats are moored to floating bollards which guide them along the shaft as it fills or empties. The Diagonal Lock Advisory Group has identified several sites in Britain where the new design could be installed, either on new waterways or canals under restoration. Projects under consideration include the restoration of the Lancaster Canal to Kendal and the proposed new branch of the Grand Union Canal between Bedford and Milton Keynes.

==== Drop locks ====
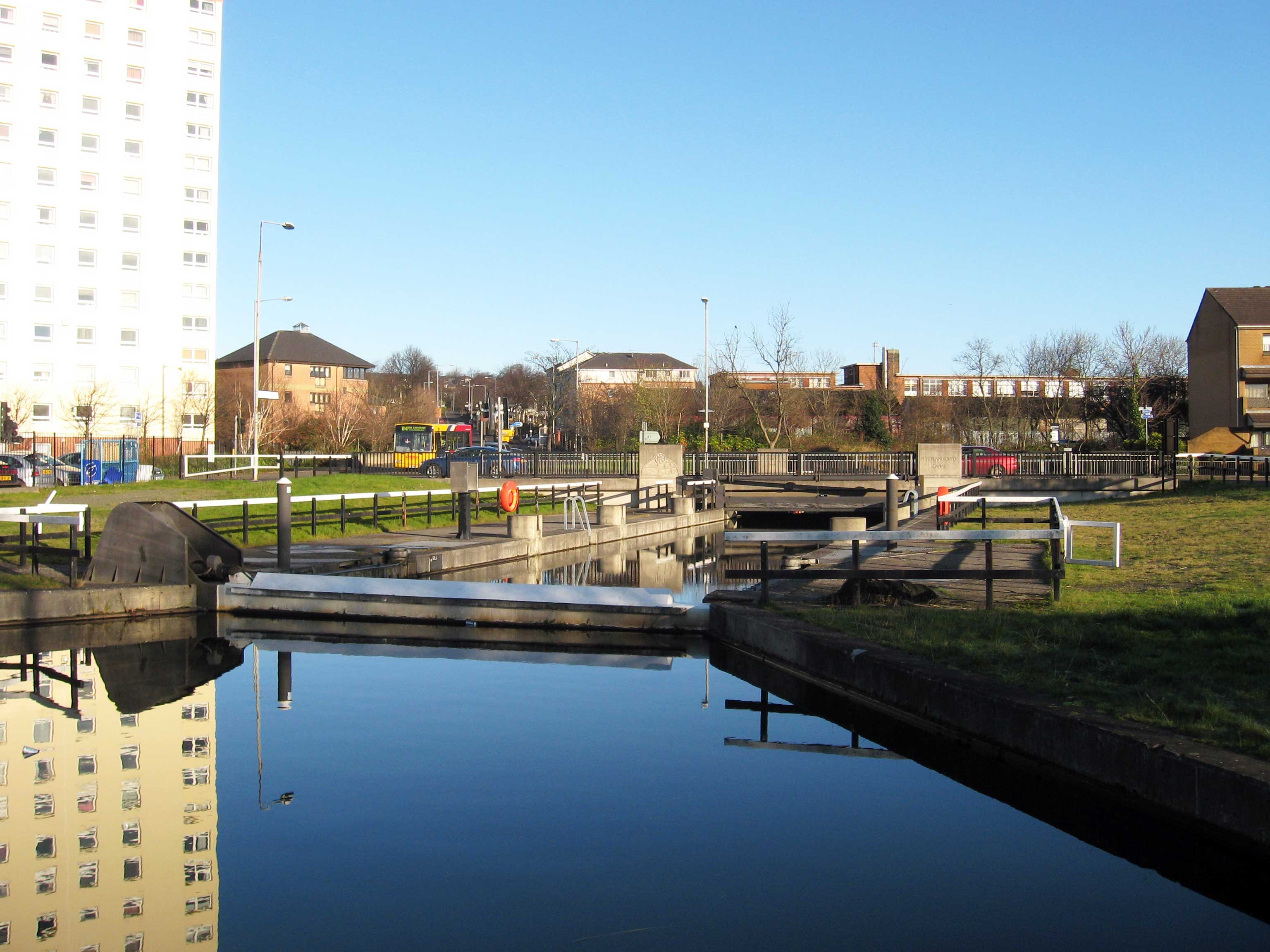
Dalmuir drop lock

A drop lock can consist of two conventional lock chambers leading to a sump pound, or a single long chamber incorporating the sump – although the term properly applies only to the second case. As the pounds at either end of the structure are at the same height, the lock can only be emptied either by allowing water to run to waste from the sump to a lower stream or drain, or (less wastefully) by pumping water back up to the canal. Particularly in the two-chamber type, there would be a need for a bypass culvert, to allow water to move along the interrupted pound and so supply locks further down the canal. In the case of the single-chamber type, this can be achieved by keeping the lock full and leaving the gates open while not in use.

While the concept has been suggested in a number of cases, the only example in the world of a drop lock that has actually been constructed is at Dalmuir on the Forth and Clyde Canal in Scotland. This lock, of the single-chamber type, was incorporated during the restoration of the canal, to allow the replacement of a swing bridge (on a busy A road) by a fixed bridge, and so answer criticisms that the restoration of the canal would cause frequent interruptions of the heavy road traffic. It can be emptied by pumping – but as this uses a lot of electricity the method used when water supplies are adequate is to drain the lock to a nearby burn.

==== Doubled, paired or twinned locks ====
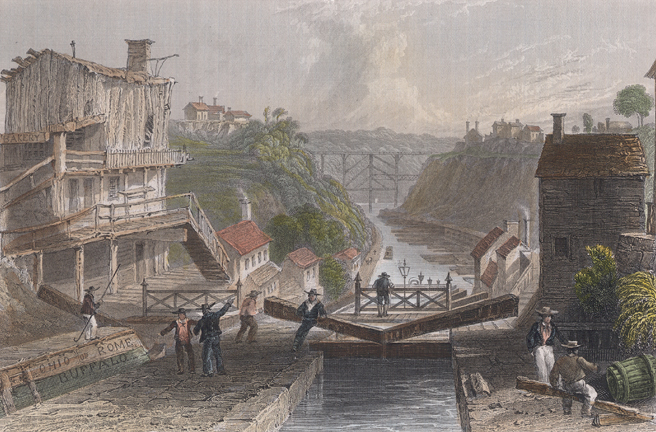
Doubled locks. The left lock has a boat in it, the right lock (center of drawing) is empty. This is on the Erie Canal at Lockport.

Locks can be built side by side on the same waterway. This is variously called doubling, pairing, or twinning. The Panama Canal has three sets of double locks. Doubling gives advantages in speed, avoiding hold-ups at busy times and increasing the chance of a boat finding a lock set in its favour. There can also be water savings: the locks may be of different sizes, so that a small boat does not need to empty a large lock; or each lock may be able to act as a side pond (water-saving basin) for the other. In this latter case, the word used is usually "twinned": here indicating the possibility of saving water by synchronising the operation of the chambers so that some water from the emptying chamber helps to fill the other. This facility has long been withdrawn on the English canals, although the disused paddle gear can sometimes be seen, as at Hillmorton on the Oxford Canal. Elsewhere they are still in use; a pair of twinned locks was opened in 2014 on the Dortmund–Ems Canal near Münster, Germany.

The Soo Locks at Sault Ste. Marie, Ontario include the two American locks, the MacArthur Lock which is 800 ft (240 m) long, 80 ft (24 m) wide, and 29.5 ft (9.0 m) deep and the Poe lock which is 1,200 ft (370 m) long, 110 ft (34 m) wide, and 32 ft (9.8 m) deep, and the Canadian lock which is 77 m (253 ft) long, 15.4 m (51 ft) wide and 13.5 m (44 ft) deep. The MacArthur is used for ships which fit the smaller locks on the Welland Canal, while the Poe lock accommodates the larger lakers that can operate only on the upper four Great Lakes. The Canadian lock is used for recreational and tour boats.

The staircase at Lockport, New York was also a doubled set of locks. Five twinned locks allowed east- and west-bound boats to climb or descend the 60 feet (18 m) Niagara Escarpment, a considerable engineering feat in the nineteenth century. While Lockport today has two large steel locks, half of the old twin stair acts as an emergency spillway and can still be seen, with the original lock gates having been restored in early 2016.

==== Round locks on intersecting canals ====
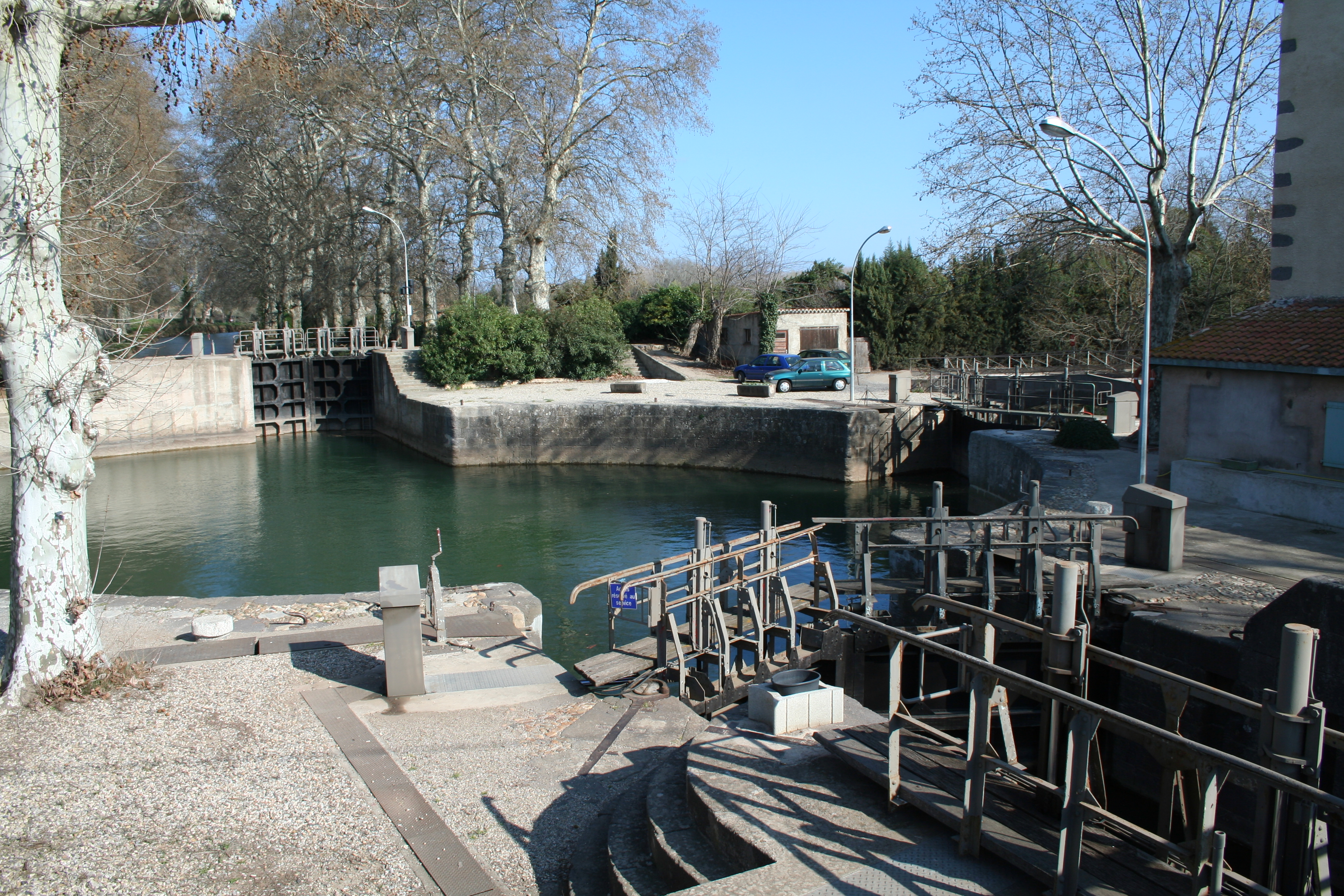
Agde Round Lock

The best known example of a round lock is the Agde Round Lock on the Canal du Midi in France. This serves as a lock on the main line of the canal and allows access to the Hérault River.

A second French round lock can be found in the form of the now-disused Écluse des Lorraines, connecting the Canal latéral à la Loire with the River Allier.

=== Lock flights ===
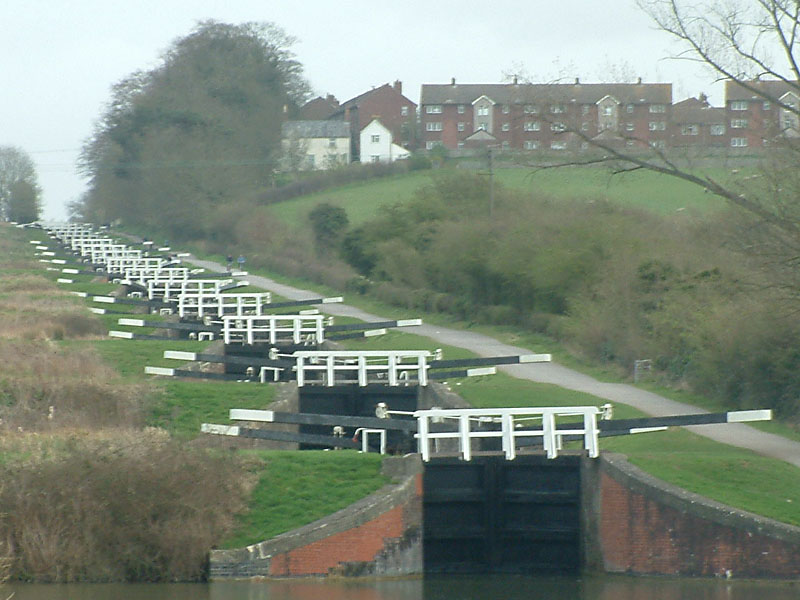
The flight of 16 locks at Caen Hill on the Kennet and Avon Canal

Loosely, a flight of locks is simply a series of locks in close-enough proximity to be identified as a single group. For many reasons, a flight of locks is preferable to the same number of locks spread more widely: crews are put ashore and picked up once, rather than multiple times; transition involves a concentrated burst of effort, rather than a continually interrupted journey; a lock keeper may be stationed to help crews through the flight quickly; and where water is in short supply, a single pump can recycle water to the top of the whole flight. The need for a flight may be determined purely by the lie of the land, but it is possible to group locks purposely into flights by using cuttings or embankments to "postpone" the height change. Examples: Caen Hill locks, Devizes.

"Flight" is not synonymous with "staircase" (see below). A set of locks is only a staircase if successive lock chambers share a gate (i.e. do not have separate top and bottom gates with a pound between them). Most flights are not staircases, because each chamber is a separate lock (with its own upper and lower gates), there is a navigable pound (however short) between each pair of locks, and the locks are operated in the conventional way.

However, some flights include (or consist entirely of) staircases. On the Grand Union (Leicester) Canal, the Watford flight consists of a four-chamber staircase and three separate locks; and the Foxton flight consists entirely of two adjacent 5-chamber staircases.

==== Staircase locks ====
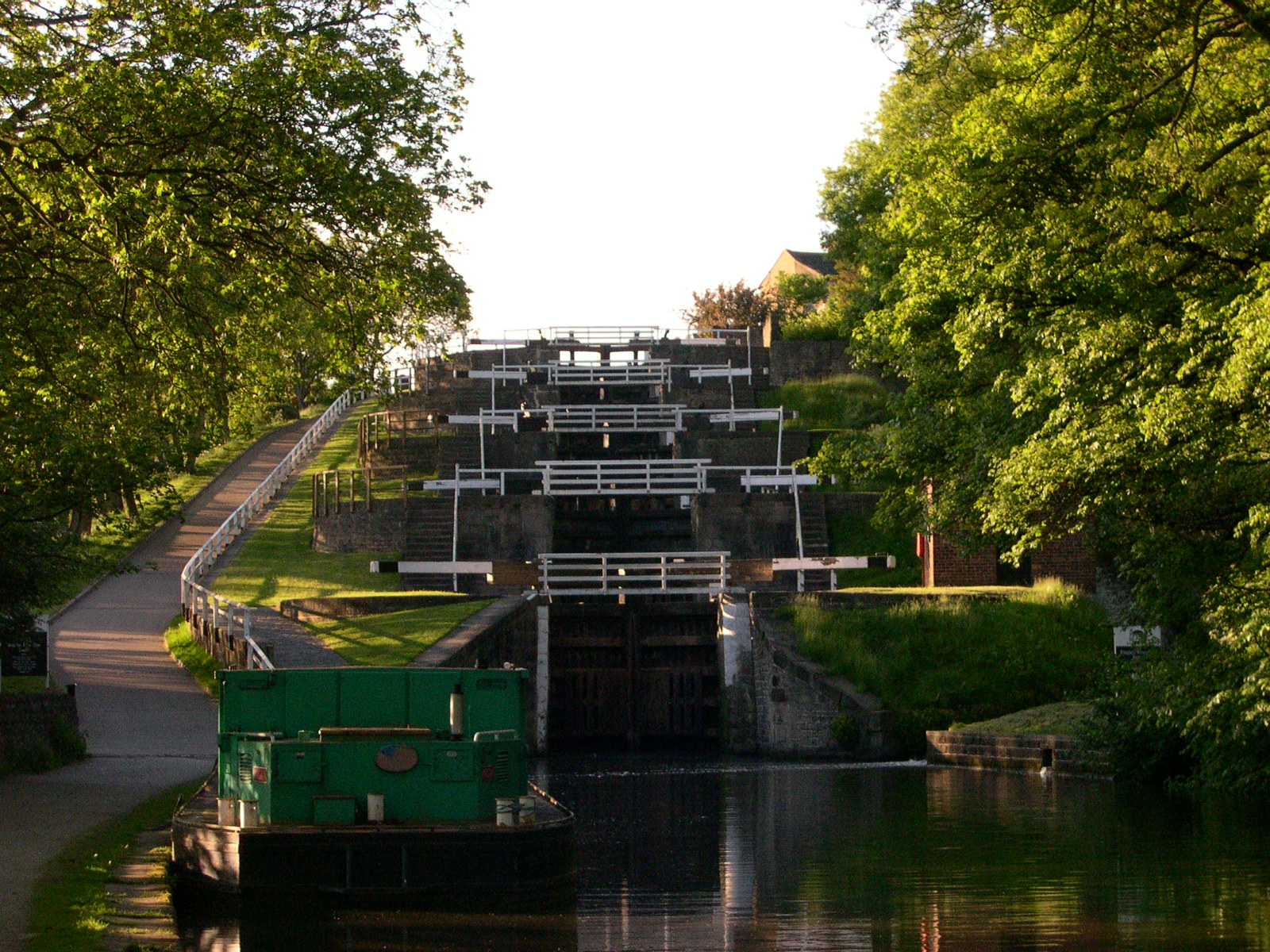
Staircase of five locks, dating from 1774, at Bingley, England

Where a very steep gradient has to be climbed, a lock staircase is used. There are two types of staircase, "real" and "apparent".

A "real" staircase can be thought of as a "compressed" flight, where the intermediate pounds have disappeared, and the upper gate of one lock is also the lower gate of the one above it. However, it is incorrect to use the terms staircase and flight interchangeably: because of the absence of intermediate pounds, operating a staircase is very different from operating a flight. It can be more useful to think of a staircase as a single lock with intermediate levels (the top gate is a normal top gate, and the intermediate gates are all as tall as the bottom gate). As there is no intermediate pound, a chamber can only be filled by emptying the one above, or emptied by filling the one below: thus the whole staircase has to be full of water (except for the bottom chamber) before a boat starts to ascend, or empty (except for the top chamber) before a boat starts to descend.

In an "apparent" staircase the chambers still have common gates, but the water does not pass directly from one chamber to the next, going instead via side ponds. This means it is not necessary to ensure that the flight is full or empty before starting.

Examples of famous "real" staircases in England are Bingley and Grindley Brook. Two-rise staircases are more common: Snakeholme Lock and Struncheon Hill Lock on the Driffield Navigation were converted to staircase locks after low water levels hindered navigation over the bottom cill at all but the higher tides – the new bottom chamber rises just far enough to get the boat over the original lock cill. In China, the recently completed Three Gorges Dam includes a double five-step staircase for large ships, and a ship lift for vessels of less than 3000 metric tons. Examples of "apparent" staircases are Foxton Locks and Watford Locks on the Leicester Branch of the Grand Union.

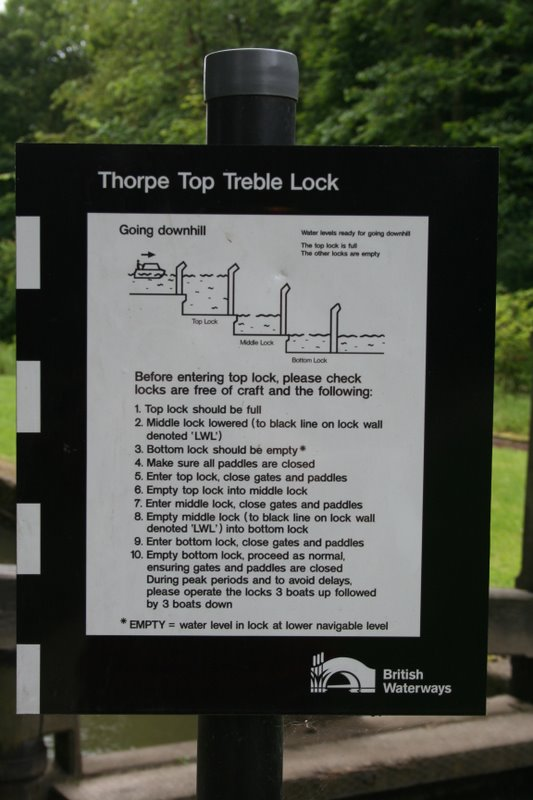
Instructions for descending the flight of three locks at Thorpe Top Treble on the Chesterfield Canal

Operation of a staircase is more involved than a flight. Inexperienced boaters may find operating staircase locks difficult. Key concerns are either sending down more water than the lower chambers can cope with (flooding the towpath, or sending a wave along the canal) or completely emptying an intermediate chamber (although this shows that a staircase lock can be used as an emergency dry dock). To avoid these mishaps, it is usual to have the whole staircase empty before starting to descend, or full before starting to ascend, apart from the initial chamber.

One difference in using a staircase of either type (compared with a single lock, or a flight) is the optimal sequence for letting boats through. In a single lock (or a flight with room for boats to pass) boats should ideally alternate in direction. In a staircase, however, it is quicker for a boat to follow a previous one going in the same direction. Partly for this reason staircase locks such as Grindley Brook, Foxton, Watford and Bratch are supervised by lockkeepers, at least during the main cruising season, in which keepers try to alternate as many boats up, followed by down as there are chambers in the flight.

As with a flight, it is possible on a broad canal for more than one boat to be in a staircase at the same time, but managing this without waste of water requires expertise. On English canals, a staircase of more than two chambers is usually staffed: the lockkeepers at Bingley (looking after both the "5-rise" and the "3-rise") ensure that there are no untoward events and that boats are moved through as speedily and efficiently as possible. Such expertise permits unusual feats, such as boats travelling in opposite directions can pass each other halfway up the staircase by moving sideways around each other; or at peak times, one can have all the chambers full simultaneously with boats travelling in the same direction.

==== Stop locks ====
When variable conditions meant that a higher water level in the new canal could not be guaranteed, then the older company would also build a stop lock (under its own control, with gates pointing towards its own canal) which could be closed when the new canal was low. This resulted in a sequential pair of locks, with gates pointing in opposite directions: one example was at Hall Green near Kidsgrove, where the southern terminus of the Macclesfield Canal joined the Hall Green Branch of the earlier Trent and Mersey Canal. The four-gate stop lock near Kings Norton Junction, between the Stratford-upon-Avon Canal and the Worcester and Birmingham Canal, was replaced in 1914 by a pair of guillotine lock gates which stopped the water flow regardless of which canal was higher. These gates have been permanently open since nationalisation.

=== Tidal locks ===
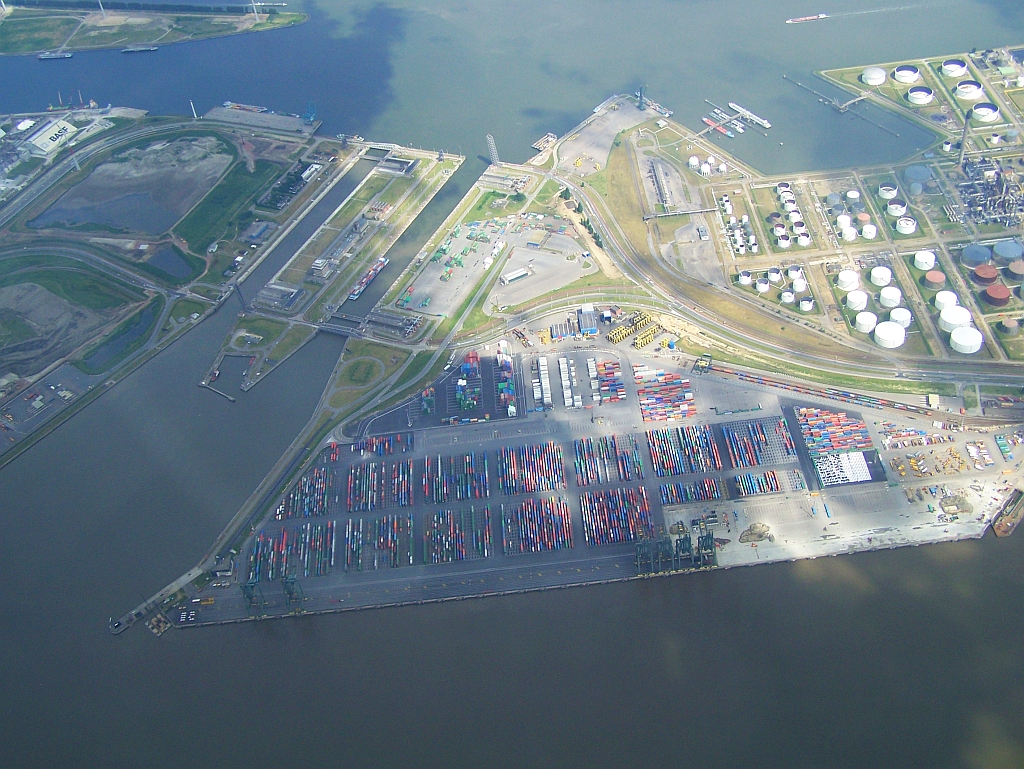
Berendrecht Lock (right) and Zandvliet Lock (left), located at the entrance to the Port of Antwerp (top) from the Scheldt (foreground).

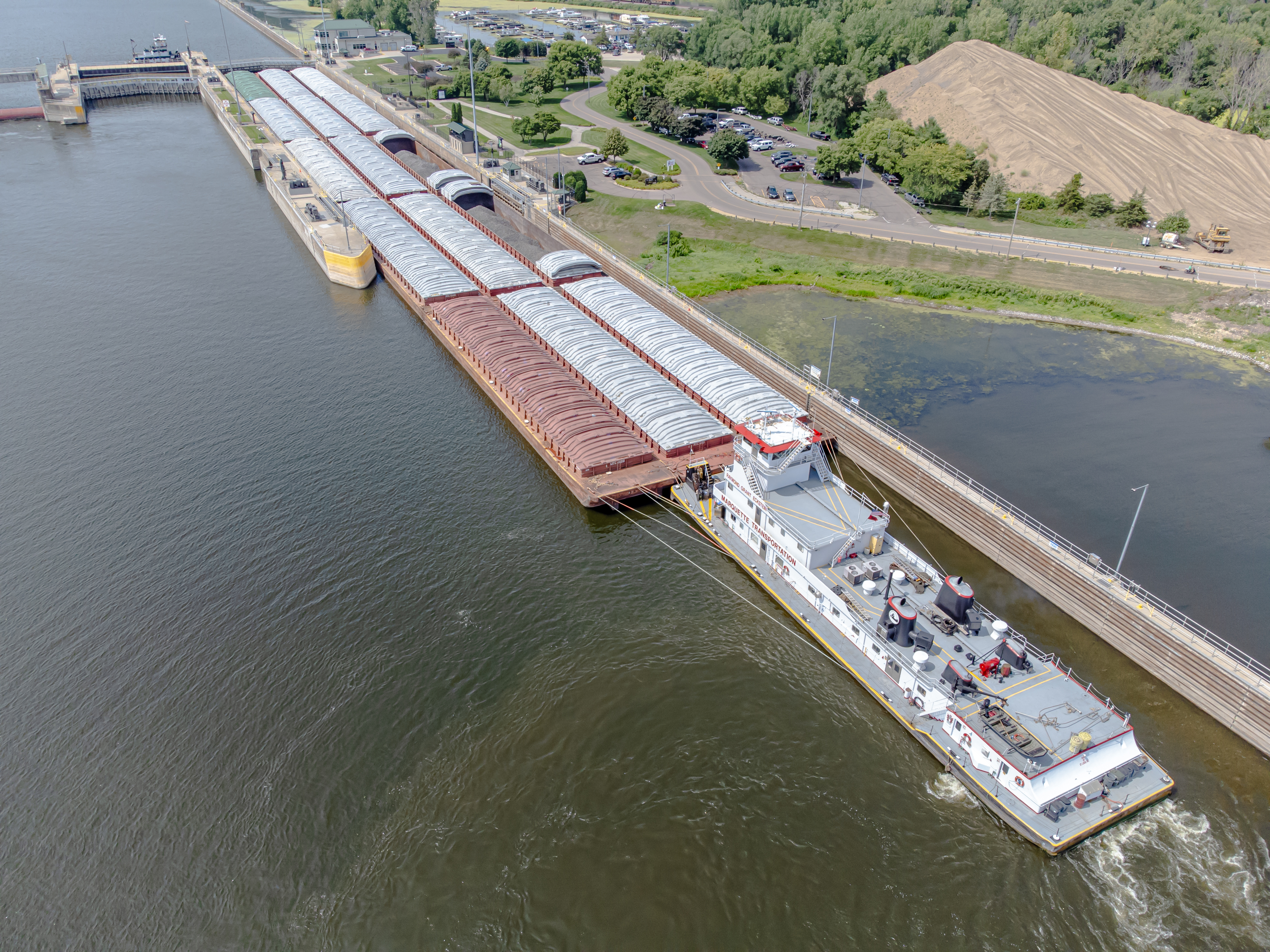
Upper Mississippi River at Lock and Dam No. 6

==== Marina locks ====
In places with significant tides, a lock can allow a marina behind it to have fixed slips, instead of the floating slips with long ramps that the tide would require. Examples include St Katharine Docks, London, England; Port of Québec Marina, Quebec City, Quebec; and Cullen Bay Marina, Darwin, Australia.

==== Sea locks ====
Locks are installed in places where an open channel would have a strong current due to different tides on two sides of a barrier. The lock in the Canso Canal is an example.

== Terminology ==
=== Cill ===
The cill, also spelled sill, is a narrow horizontal ledge protruding a short way into the chamber from below the upper gates. Allowing the rear of the boat to "hang" on the cill is the main danger when descending a lock, and the position of the forward edge of the cill is usually marked on the lock side by a white line. The edge of the cill is usually curved, protruding less in the center than at the edges. In some locks, there is a piece of oak about 9 in (23 cm) thick which protects the solid part of the lock cill. On the Oxford Canal it is called a babbie; on the Grand Union Canal it is referred to as the cill bumper. Some canal operation authorities, primarily in the United States and Canada, call the ledge a miter sill (mitre sill in Canada).

=== Fish ladders ===
The construction of locks (or weirs and dams) on rivers obstructs the passage of fish. Some fish such as lampreys, trout and salmon go upstream to spawn. Measures such as a fish ladder are often taken to counteract this. Navigation locks have also potential to be operated as fishways to provide increased access for a range of biota.

=== Gates ===
Gates are the watertight doors which seal off the chamber from the upper and lower pounds. Each end of the chamber is equipped with a gate, or pair of half-gates, traditionally made of oak or elm but now usually made of steel. The most common arrangement, usually called miter gates, was invented by Leonardo da Vinci sometime around the late 15th century.

=== Paddle ===
On the old Erie Canal, there was a danger of injury when operating the paddles: water, on reaching a certain position, would push the paddles with a force which could tear the windlass (or handle) out of one's hands, or if one was standing in the wrong place, could knock one into the canal, leading to injuries and drownings.

=== Pound ===
A pound is the level stretch of water between two locks (also known as a reach).

=== Powered operation ===
On large modern canals, especially very large ones such as ship canals, the gates and paddles are too large to be hand operated, and are operated by hydraulic or electrical equipment. On the Caledonian Canal the lock gates were operated by man-powered capstans, one connected by chains to open the gate and another to draw it closed. By 1968 these had been replaced by hydraulic power acting through steel rams.

=== Rise ===
The rise is the change in water-level in the lock. The two deepest locks on the English canal system are Bath deep lock on the Kennet and Avon Canal and Tuel Lane Lock on the Rochdale Canal, which both have a rise of nearly 20 feet (6.1 m). Both locks are amalgamations of two separate locks, which were combined when the canals were restored to accommodate changes in road crossings. By comparison, the Carrapatelo and Valeira locks on the Douro river in Portugal, which are 279 feet (85 m) long and 39 feet (12 m) wide, have maximum lifts of 115 and 108 feet (35 and 33 m) respectively.

The two Ardnacrusha locks near Limerick on the Shannon navigation in Ireland have a rise of 100 feet (30 m). The upper chamber rises 60 feet (18 m) and is connected to the lower chamber by a tunnel, which when descending does not become visible until the chamber is nearly empty.

=== Snubbing posts ===
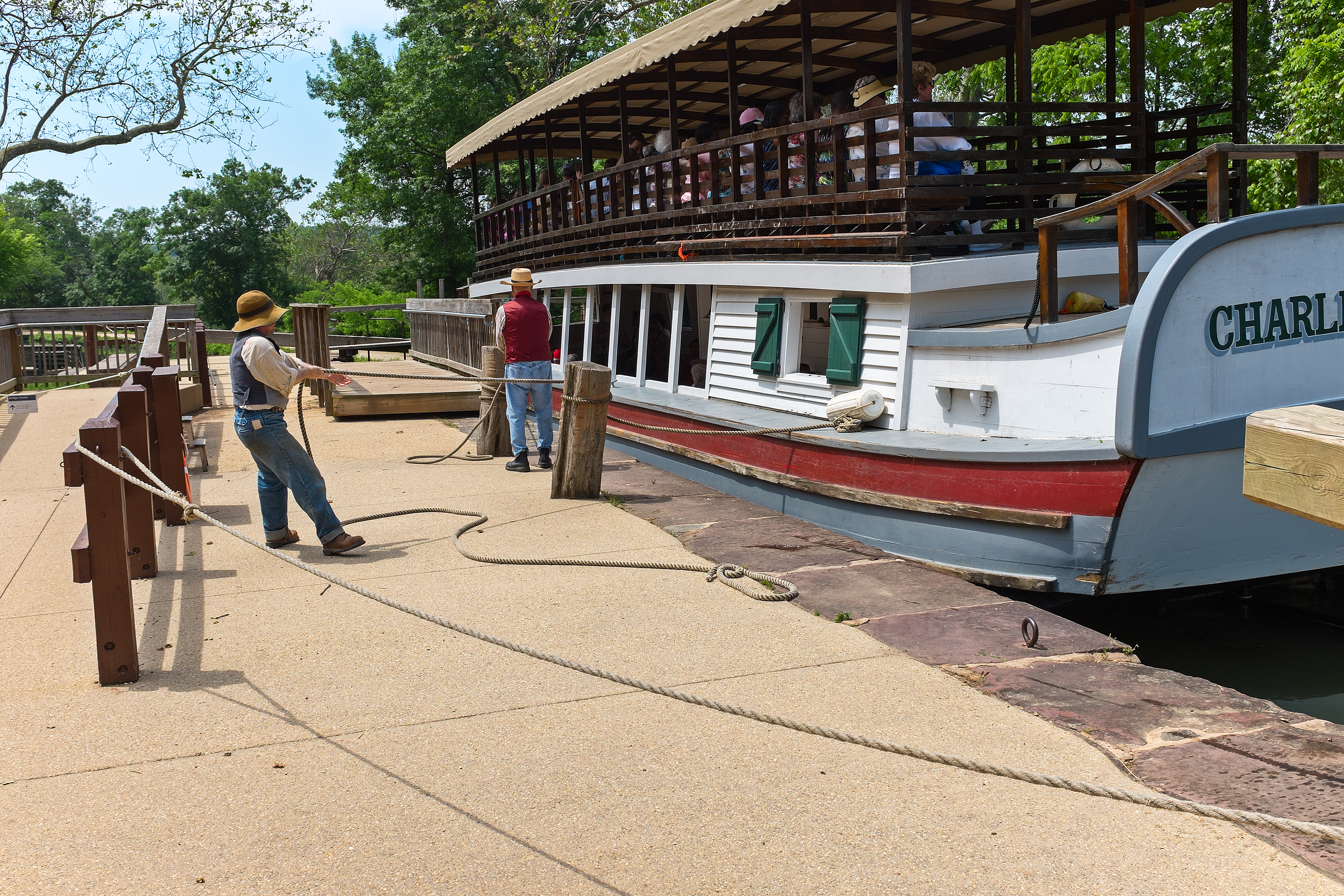
Snubbing a boat to keep it from hitting the downstream gates. Note the rope wrapped around the snubbing post.

On horse-drawn and mule-drawn canals, snubbing posts were used to slow or stop a boat in the lock. A 200-ton boat moving at a few miles an hour could destroy the lock gate. To prevent this, a rope was wound around the snubbing post as the boat entered the lock. Pulling on the rope slowed the boat, due to the friction of the rope against the post. A rope 2 1/2 inches (6.4 cm) in diameter and about 60 feet (18 meters) long was typically used on the Erie Canal to snub a boat in a lock.

One incident, which took place in June 1873 on the Chesapeake and Ohio Canal, involved the boat the Henry C. Flagg and its drunk captain. That boat was already leaking; the crew, having partially pumped the water out, entered Lock 74, moving in front of another boat. Because they failed to snub the boat, it crashed into and knocked out the downstream gates. The outrush of water from the lock caused the upstream gates to slam shut, breaking them also, and sending a cascade of water over the boat, sinking it. This suspended navigation on the canal for 48 hours until the lock gates could be replaced and the boat removed from the lock.

=== Swell or swelling ===
A swell was caused by opening suddenly the paddle valves in the lock gates, or when emptying a lock. To help boats traveling downstream exit a lock, the locksman would sometimes open the paddles to create a swell, which would help "flush" the boat out of the lock. A boatsman might ask for a back swell, that is, to open and shut the paddles a few times to create some waves, to help him get off the bank where he was stuck. If boats ran aground (from being overloaded) they sometimes asked passing crews to tell the upstream lock to give them an extra heavy swell, which consisted of opening all the paddles on the lock gate, creating a surge that affected the whole pound below.

On the Erie Canal, some loaded boats needed a swell to get out of the lock. Particularly lumber boats, being top heavy, would list to one side and get stuck in the lock, and needed a swell to get them out. Some lockkeepers would give a swell to anyone to help them on the way, but some would ask for money for the swell.

The Erie Canal management did not like swelling for two reasons. First, it used too much water lowering the water on the pound above sometimes causing boats to run aground. In addition, it raised the water level on the pound below, causing some boats to strike bridges or get stuck.

=== Water-saving basins ===
On English canals, these reservoirs are called "side ponds". The Droitwich Canal, reopened in 2011, has a flight of three locks at Hanbury which all have operational side ponds.

=== Windlass ("lock key") ===
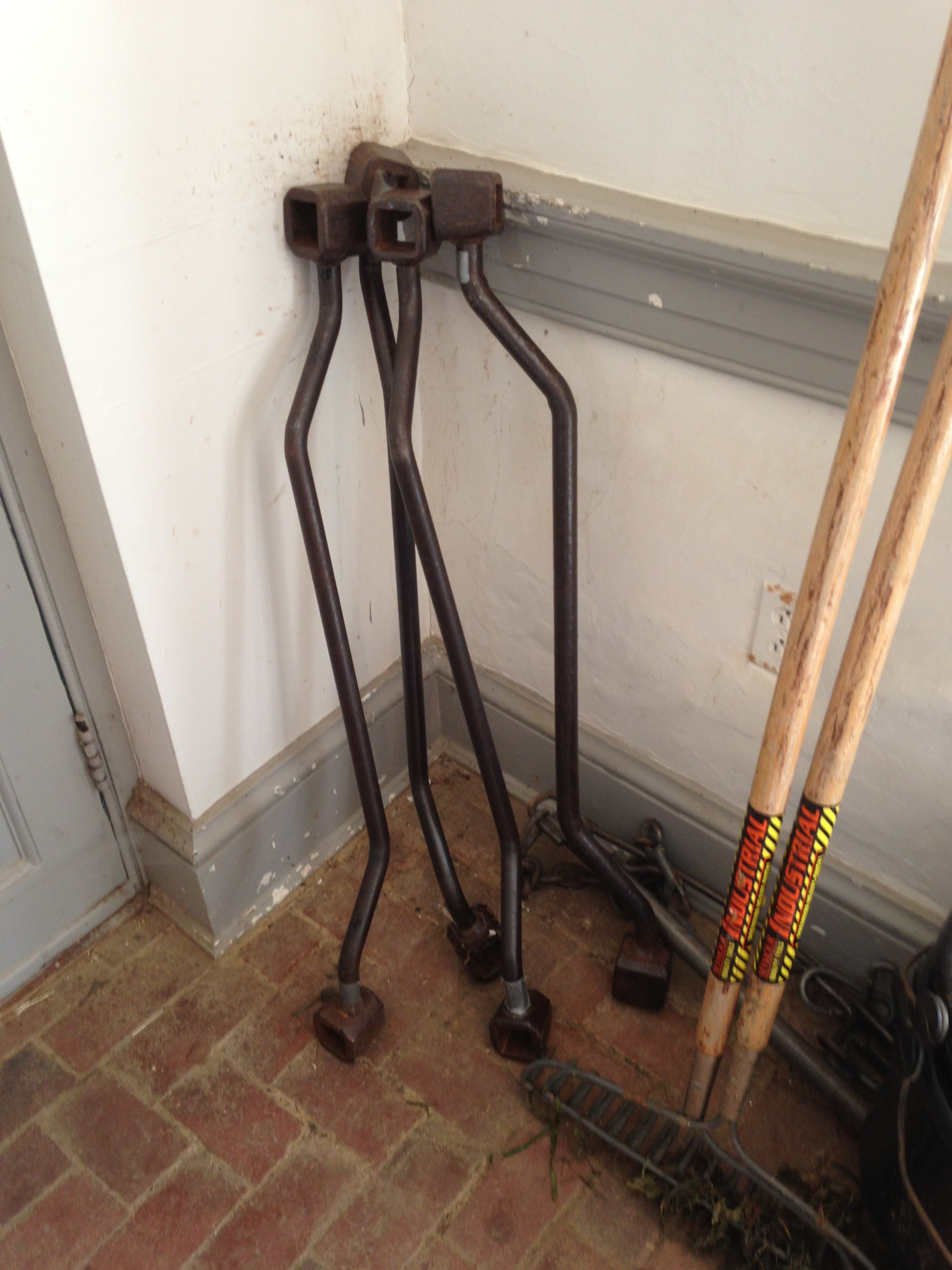
Collection of lock windlasses. The rakes are to assist with clearing trash out of the lock.

On the Chesapeake and Ohio Canal, the lockkeepers were required to remove the windlasses from all lock paddles at night, to prevent unauthorized use.

== Largest locks ==
The size of locks cannot be compared without considering the difference in water level that they are designed to operate under. For example, the Bollène lock on the River Rhône has a fall of at least 23 m (75 ft), the Leerstetten, Eckersmühlen and Hilpoltstein locks on the Rhine–Main–Danube Canal have a fall of 24.67 m (80.9 ft), each and the Oskemen Lock on the Irtysh River in Kazakhstan has a drop of 42 m (138 ft).

In 2016, the Kieldrecht Lock in the Port of Antwerp in Belgium took over the title of the world's largest lock from the Berendrecht Lock in the same port and still has the title for largest volume. In 2022, the IJmuiden sea lock serving the Port of Amsterdam became the world's largest lock by surface area. The lock is 500 m (1,600 ft) long, 70 m (230 ft) wide and has sliding lock gates creating a usable depth of 18 m (59 ft).

== Photo gallery ==
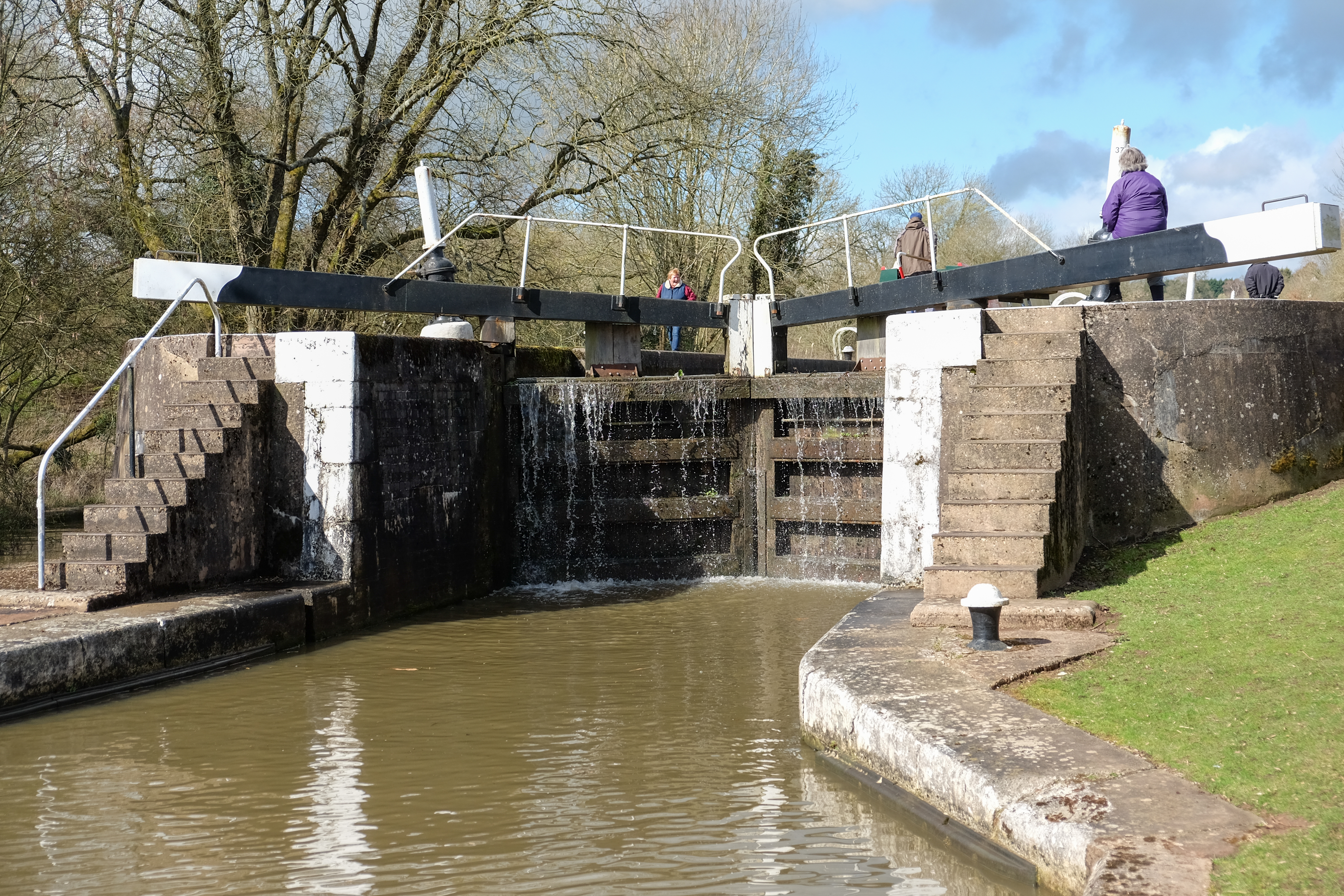
A gate in the Hatton flight in England

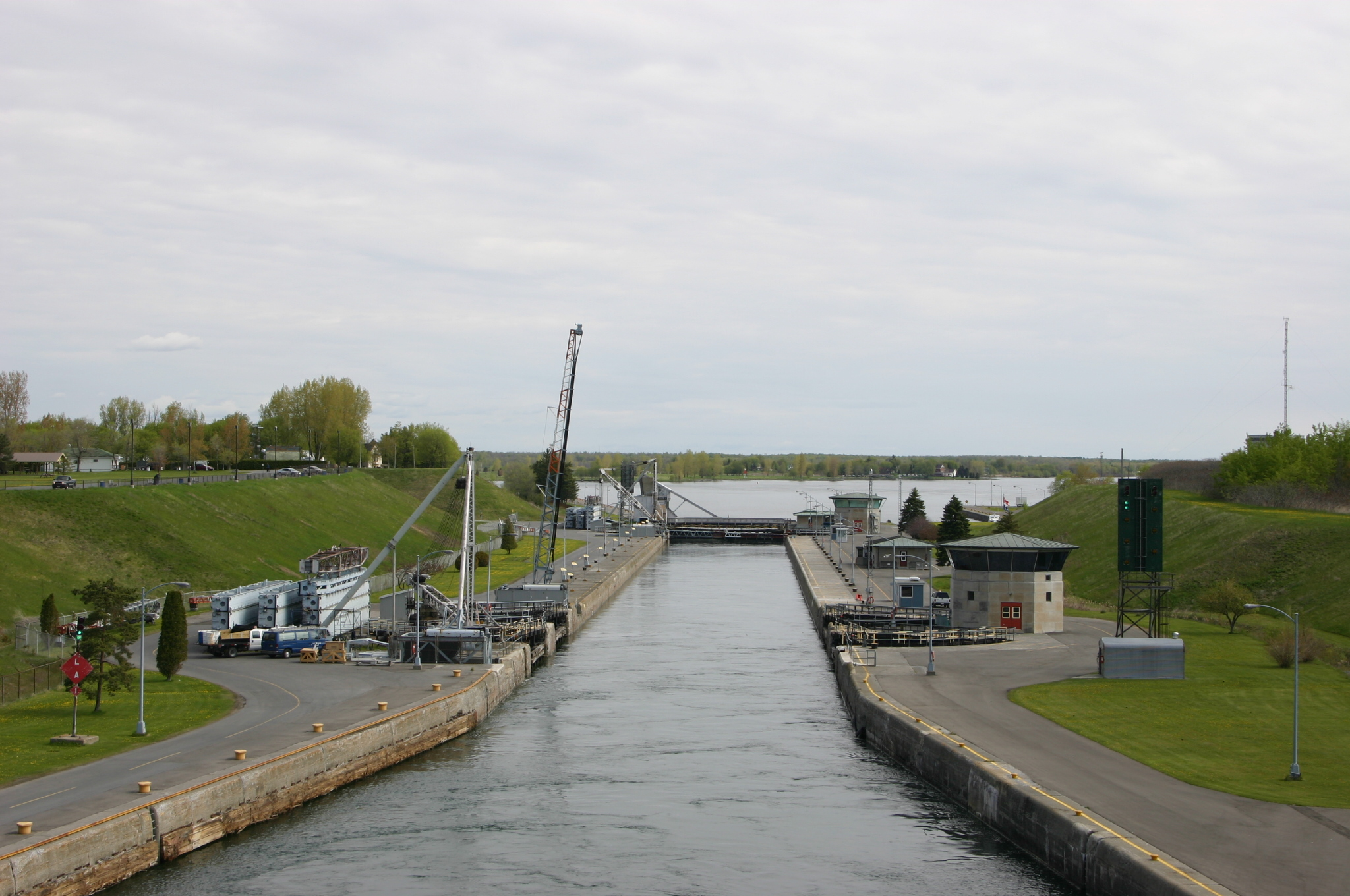
Iroquois Lock on the Saint Lawrence Seaway

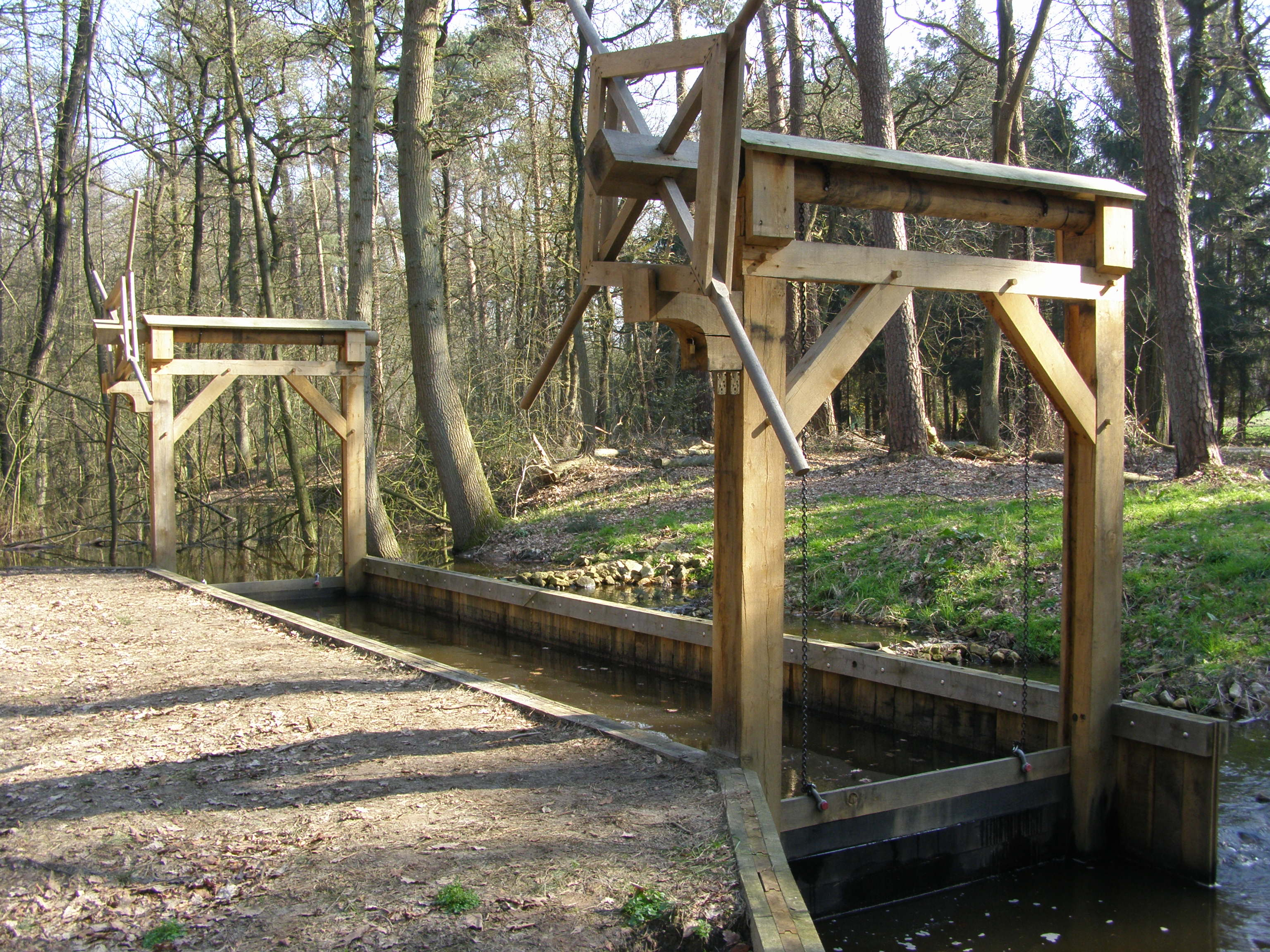
Model of early river pound lock, constructed in Lankheet water park, Netherlands.

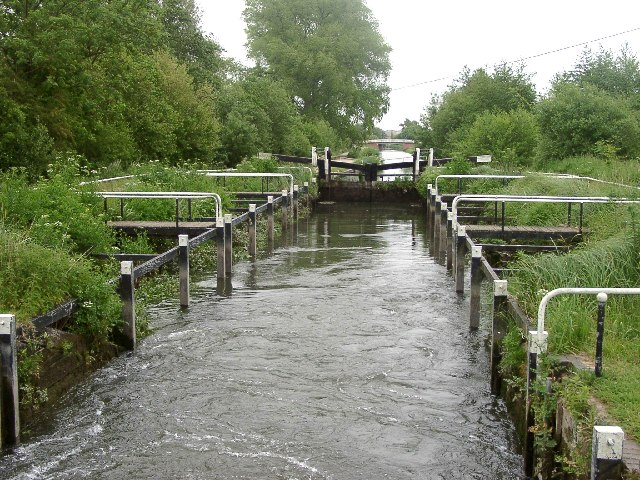
The turf-sided Monkey Marsh Lock on the Kennet & Avon Canal at Thatcham.

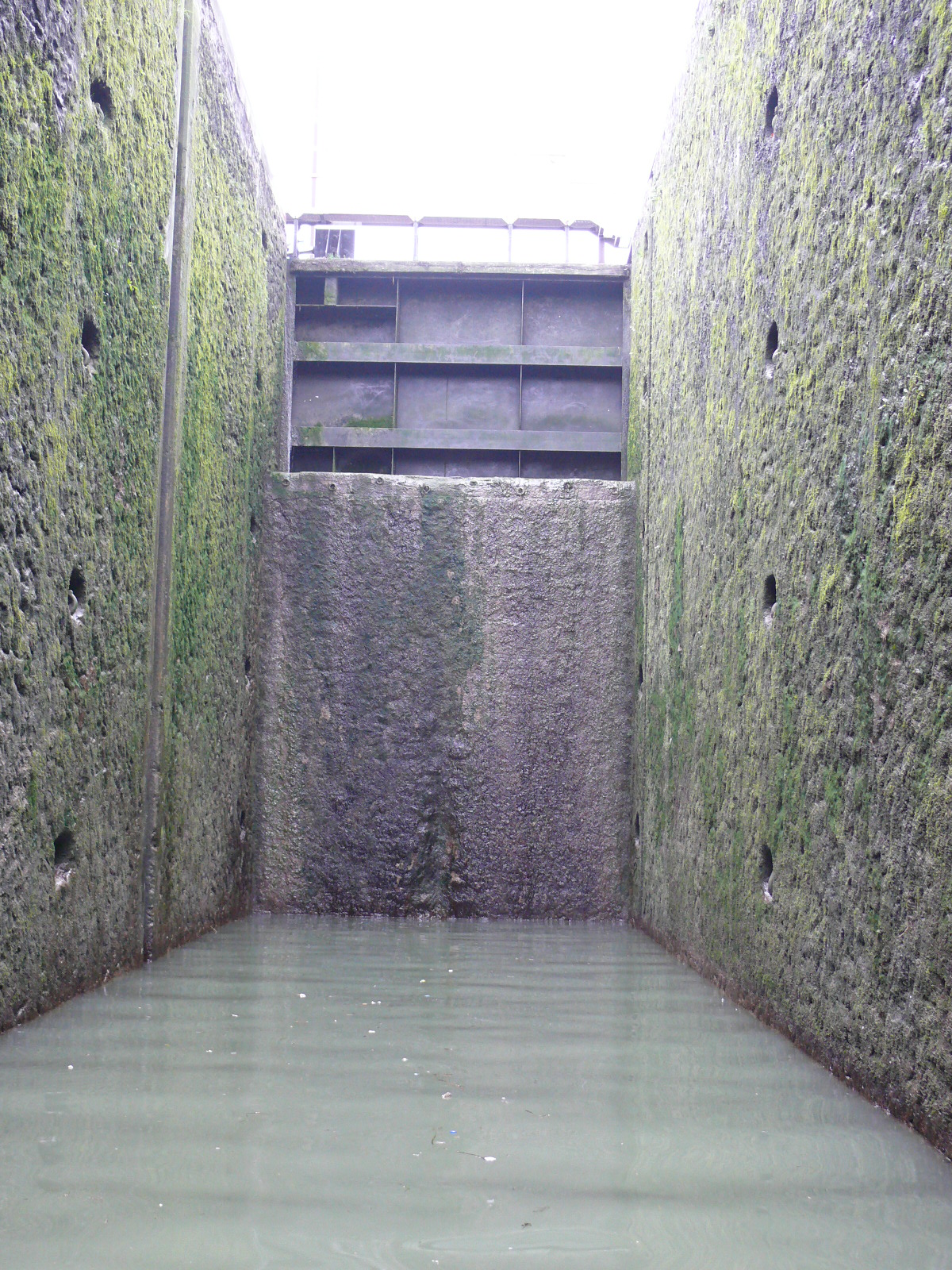
The cill exposed in the deep Pont de Flandre lock on the Canal Saint-Denis, Paris.

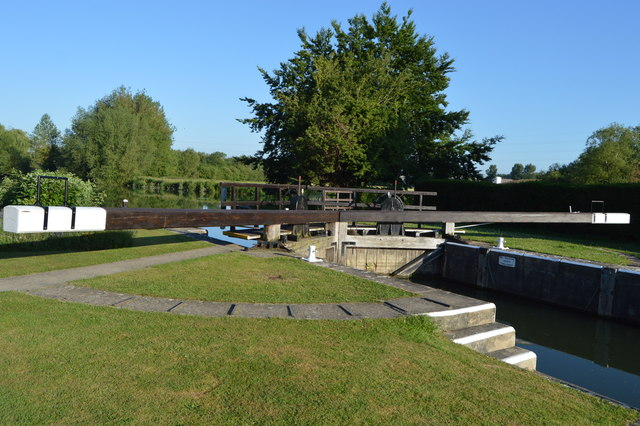
The balance beams typical of many locks on the Upper Thames at Eynsham Lock, Eynsham, Oxfordshire, England. Visible on the gates are the paddle winding gears, used to operate the sluice gates.

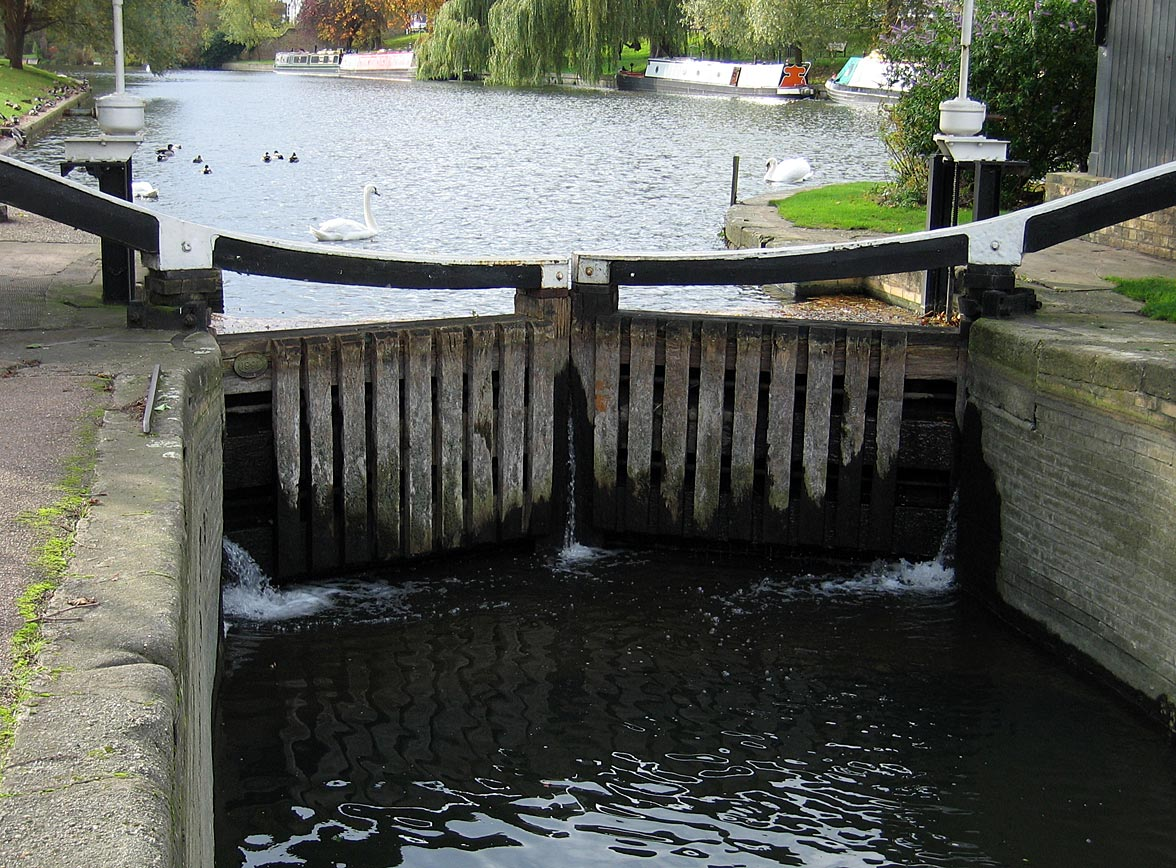
Top gates of Jesus Lock, a beam lock on the River Cam in Cambridge, England.

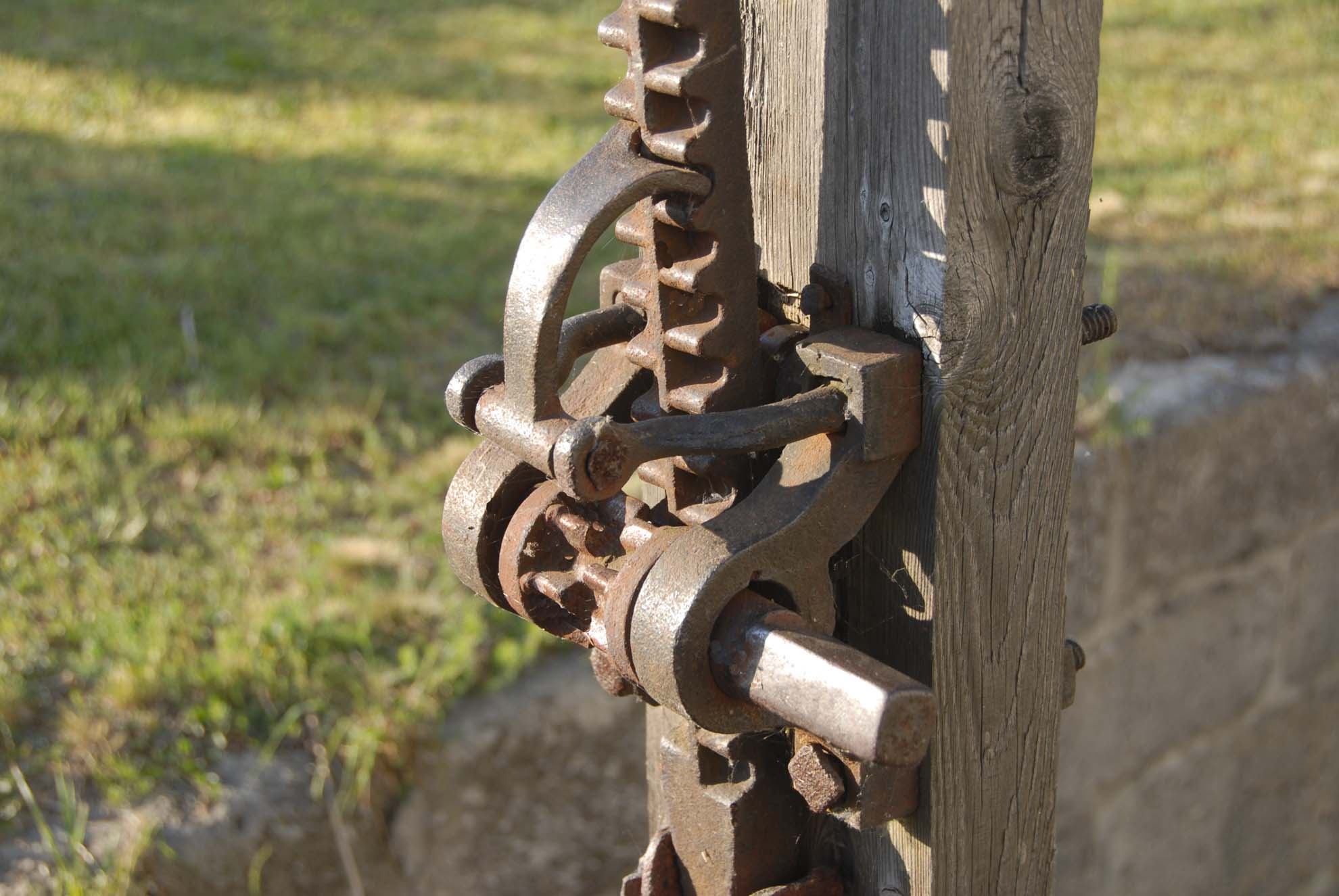
200-year-old paddle gear on the Wiener Neustädter Kanal, Austria

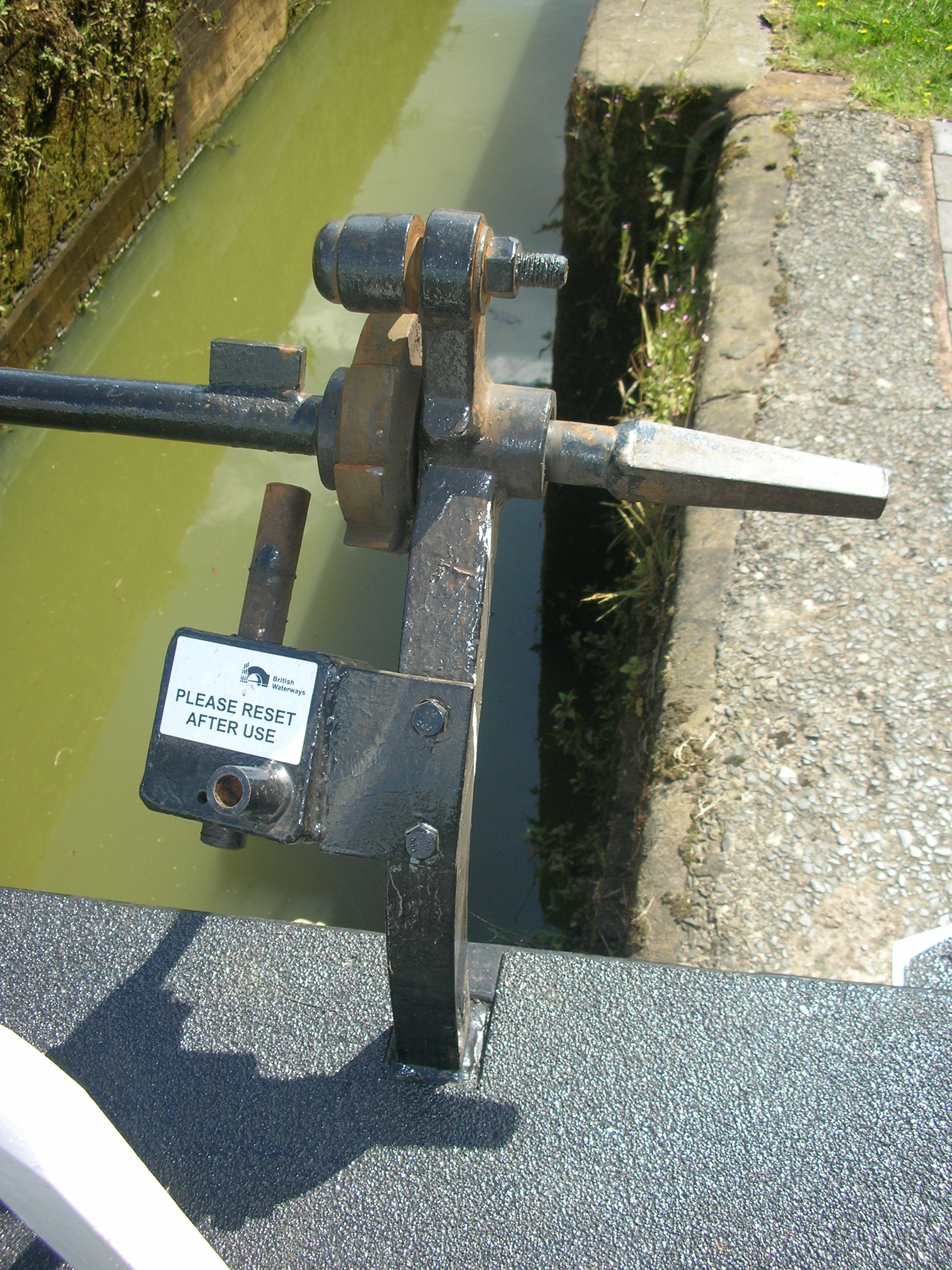
Water conservation gear on the Birmingham Canal Navigations

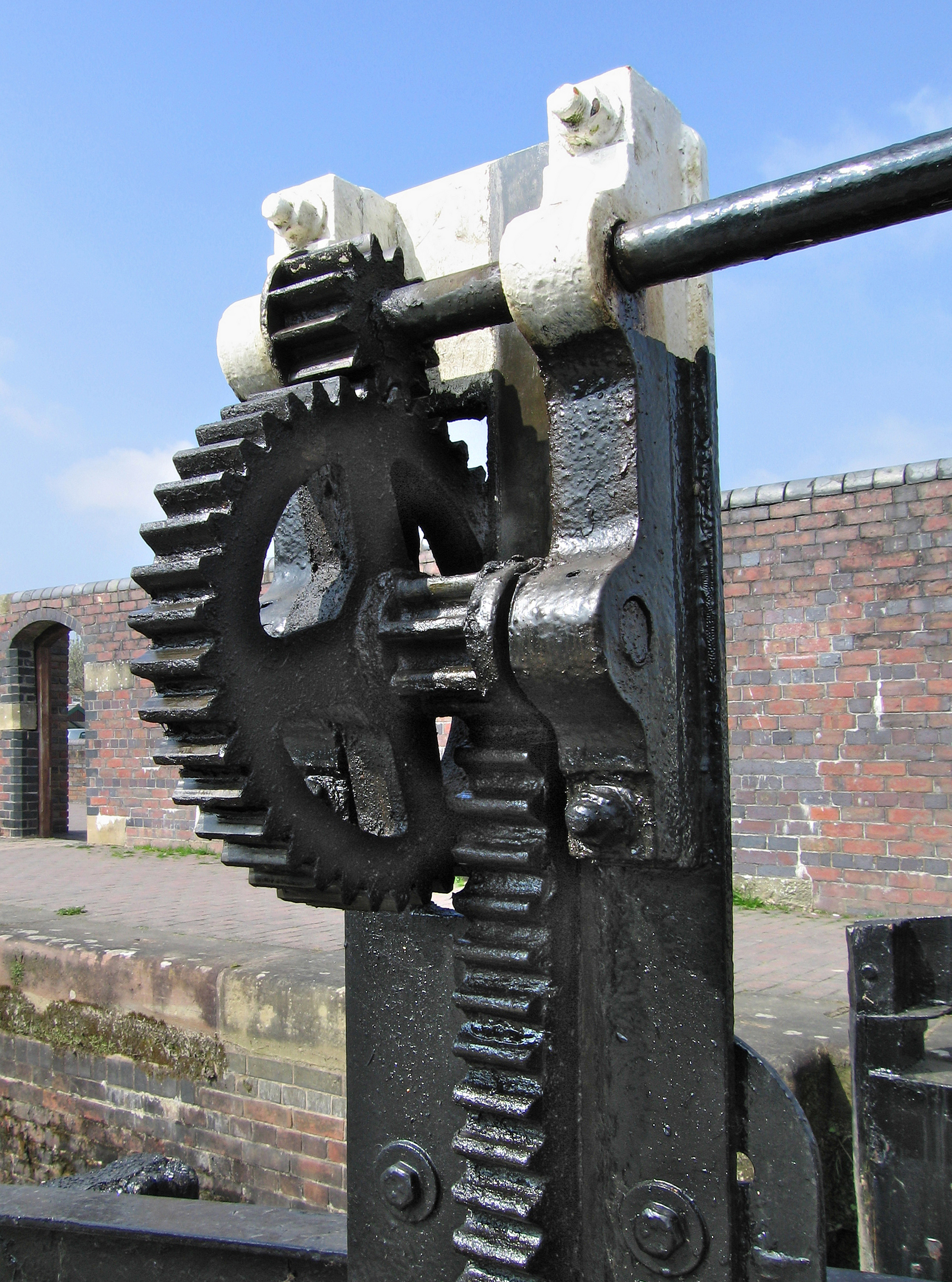
Lock gate controls on a canal

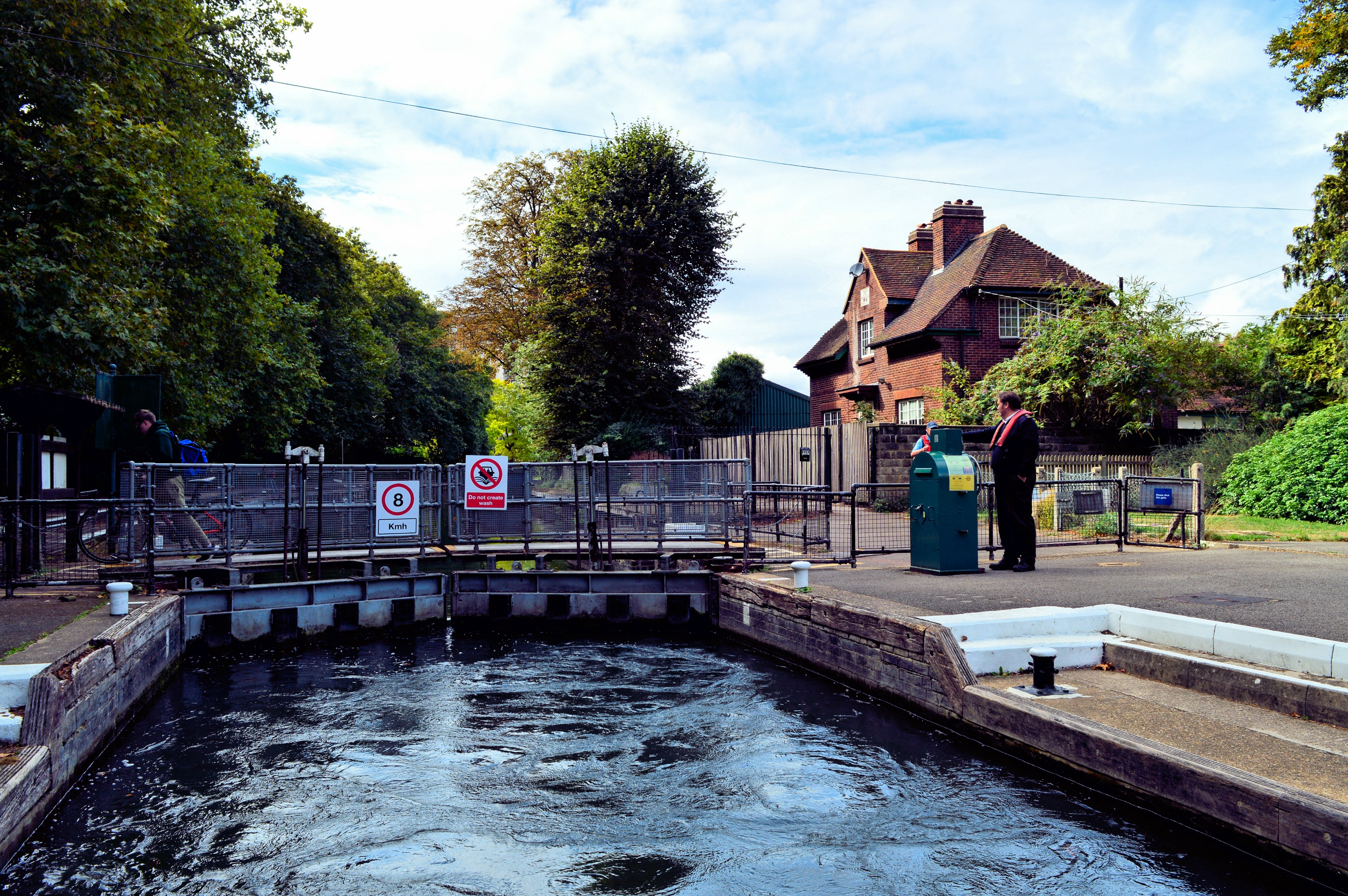
Caversham Lock on the River Thames, with its chamber nearly filled. Visible on top of the gates are the hydraulic mechanisms that raise and lower the sluices in their raised position. To the right is one of two pedestals which are used to operate the gates and sluices, as well as the lock cottage.

== See also ==
- Canal
  - Canal safety gates
  - Channel (geography)
  - Canal & River Trust
- Water resources
  - List of waterways
  - List of canals by country
  - Canals of Amsterdam
  - Canals of the United Kingdom
- Hydraulics
  - Hydraulic engineering
  - Control lock
  - Sluice
  - Watermill
  - Water slope

== Bibliography ==
- Cumberlidge, Jane (2009). Inland Waterways of Great Britain (eighth ed.). Imray Laurie Norie and Wilson. ISBN 978-1-84623-010-3.
