= Agde Round Lock =

Lock on the Canal du Midi, France

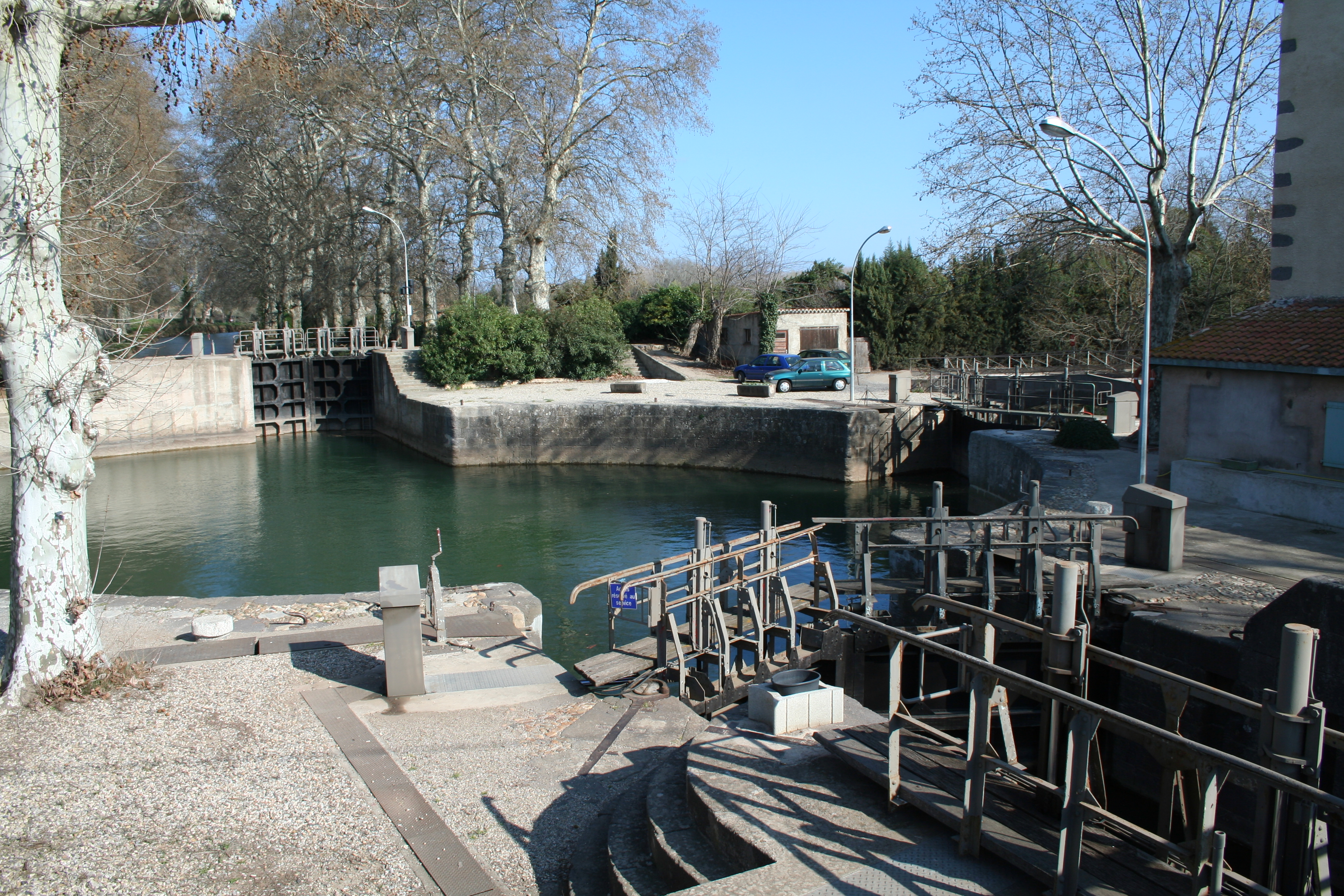
- The round lock at Agde
- 43.320253°N 3.467624°E
- Waterway: Canal du Midi
- Country: France
- Maintained by: Voies navigables de France
- Operation: Hydraulic
- First built: c1676

The Agde Round Lock (French: L'Écluse Ronde d'Agde) is a canal lock on the Canal du Midi that connects to the Hérault River in Agde, France. It is almost unique because it is round, which allows a boat to turn around, and the fact that it has three sets of lock gates, each with a different water level. It was built in 1676 of volcanic stone and was originally 29.20 m in diameter, 5.20 m deep.

The lock is no longer round. It was expanded during a program begun in 1978 to expand locks to the Freycinet gauge to allow for barges up to 38.50 metres long.

Originally, buildings in the area of the lock included an administration building, stables, shops, and a chapel.

The exits are to Béziers via the western section of the Canal du Midi, to Étang de Thau via the upper Hérault river and the eastern section of the Canal du Midi, and south to the Mediterranean via the lower Hérault river.

A second French round lock can be found in the form of the now-disused Écluse des Lorraines, connecting the Canal latéral à la Loire with the River Allier.

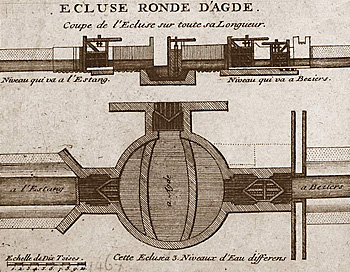
Above, Béziers is shown to the right, Mediterranean on the top, and Etang de Thau to the left.

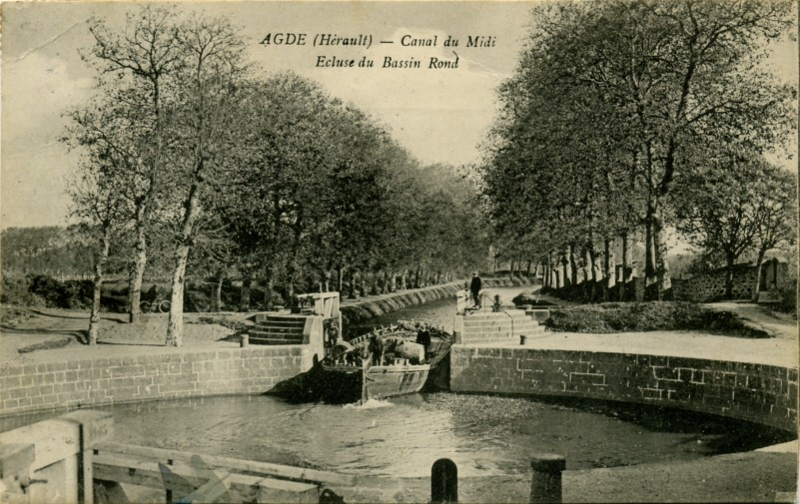
